= List of XML and HTML character entity references =

In SGML, HTML and XML documents, the logical constructs known as character data and attribute values consist of sequences of characters, in which each character can manifest directly (representing itself), or can be represented by a series of characters called a character reference, of which there are two types: a numeric character reference and a character entity reference. This article lists the character entity references that are valid in HTML and XML documents.

== Character reference overview ==
In HTML and XML, a numeric character reference refers to a character by its Universal Coded Character Set/Unicode code point, and uses the format: &#xhhhh; or &#nnn; where the x must be lowercase in XML documents, hhhh is the code point in hexadecimal form and nnn is the code point in decimal form. The hhhh (or nnn) may be any number of hexadecimal (or decimal) digits and may include leading zeros. The hhhh for hexadecimal digits may mix uppercase and lowercase letters, though uppercase is the usual style. The XML and HTML standards restrict the usable code points to a set of valid values, which is a subset of UCS/Unicode code point values, that excludes all code points assigned to non-characters or to surrogates, and most code points assigned to C0 and C1 controls (with the exception of line separators and tabulations treated as white spaces).

By contrast, a character entity reference refers to a sequence of one or more characters by the name of an entity which has the desired characters as its replacement text. The format is: &name; where name is the case-sensitive name of the entity. The semicolon is usually required in the character entity reference, unless marked otherwise in the table below (see (Note: The trailing semicolon may be omitted for this named entity.)). The entity must either be predefined (built into the markup language), or declared in a Document Type Definition (DTD) by using <!ENTITY name "value">. (Note: DTD: see § Formal public identifiers for HTML DTD entities subsets)

== Standard public entity sets for characters ==
XML
XML specifies five predefined entities needed to support every printable ASCII character: &amp;, &lt;, &gt;, &apos;, and &quot;. The trailing semicolon is mandatory in XML (and XHTML) for these five entities (even if HTML or SGML allows omitting it for some of them, according to their DTD).
ISO Entity Sets
SGML supplied a comprehensive set of entity declarations for characters widely used in Western technical and reference publishing, for Latin, Greek and Cyrillic scripts. The American Mathematical Society also contributed entities for mathematical characters (see (Note: Old ISO subset: see § Formal public identifiers for old ISO entities subsets)).
HTML Entity Sets
Early versions of HTML built in small subsets of these, relating to characters found in three Western 8-bit character sets.
MathML Entity Sets
The W3C developed a set of entity declarations for MathML characters.
XML Entity Sets
The W3C MathML Working Group took over maintenance of the ISO public entity sets, combined with the MathML and documents them in XML Entity Definitions for Characters. This set can support the requirements of XHTML, MathML and as an input to future versions of HTML.
HTML5
HTML5 adopts the XML entities as named character references, and does not group them into sets. The character reference names originate from XML Entity Definitions for Characters. The HTML5 specification additionally provides mappings from the names to Unicode character sequences using JSON.

Numerous other entity sets have been developed for special requirements, and for major and minority scripts. However, the advent of Unicode has largely superseded them.

=== Formal public identifiers for HTML DTD entities subsets ===
The full formal public identifier and system identifier for the DTD entities subset (where the character entity name is defined) is actually mapped from one of the following three defined named entities:

HTML DTD entities subsets
Name	Version	Formal public identifier	System identifier
HTMLlat1	HTML 4	"-//W3C//ENTITIES Latin 1//EN//HTML"	"http://www.w3.org/TR/html4/HTMLlat1.ent" (optional)
HTMLlat1	XHTML 1	"-//W3C//ENTITIES Latin 1 for XHTML//EN"	"http://www.w3.org/TR/xhtml1/DTD/xhtml-lat1.ent"
HTMLsymbol	HTML 4	"-//W3C//ENTITIES Symbols//EN//HTML"	"http://www.w3.org/TR/html4/HTMLsymbol.ent" (optional)
HTMLsymbol	XHTML 1	"-//W3C//ENTITIES Symbols for XHTML//EN"	"http://www.w3.org/TR/xhtml1/DTD/xhtml-symbol.ent"
HTMLspecial	HTML 4	"-//W3C//ENTITIES Special//EN//HTML"	"http://www.w3.org/TR/html4/HTMLspecial.ent" (optional)
HTMLspecial	XHTML 1	"-//W3C//ENTITIES Special for XHTML//EN"	"http://www.w3.org/TR/xhtml1/DTD/xhtml-special.ent"
html.dtd (Note: The original HTML 1.0 DTD, which would have been available at http://info.cern.ch/MarkUp/html-spec/html.dtd)		N/A	"http://info.cern.ch/MarkUp/html-spec/html.dtd"
HTML 5 (Note: There is no DTD for HTML 5, where all entities are predefined; it is impossible to strictly validate in XML the schema needed for (X)HTML 5, without also defining custom XSD's (at least for the custom "data-*" attributes). Rather than requiring support for a DTD (with the associated security concerns such as billion laughs), the best way to securely interchange HTML5 with XHTML is to convert all entity references to plain-text, numerical character references, or (where applicable) the five standard entities of XML 1.0. That being said: The HTML 5 entity set is also used in MathML 3 and, for that purpose, its DTD entities subset is assigned the identifier set PUBLIC "-//W3C//ENTITIES HTML MathML Set//EN//XML" "http://www.w3.org/2003/entities/2007/htmlmathml-f.ent".; The WHATWG specification encourages browsers to map the formal public identifiers for MathML 2 or XHTML 1.x (when used in XML) to a data URI containing the HTML5 entity set, and give this precedence over the provided system identifier, so as to "handle entities in an interoperable fashion without requiring any network access".)		"-//W3C//ENTITIES HTML MathML Set//EN//XML"	"http://www.w3.org/2003/entities/2007/htmlmathml-f.ent"

=== Formal public identifiers for old ISO entities subsets ===
The ISO entities subsets are old (documented) character subsets, which are given SGML character entity names in ISO 8879 and ISO 9573, and which were used in legacy encodings before the unification within ISO 10646. Their full formal public identifiers are as follows:

ISO entities subsets
Name	Formal public identifier(s)
ISOamsa	"ISO 8879:1986//ENTITIES Added Math Symbols: Arrow Relations//EN" (Note: A version beginning with ISO 8879-1986// instead of ISO 8879:1986// is considered deprecated.); "ISO 9573-13:1991//ENTITIES Added Math Symbols: Arrow Relations//EN"
ISOamsb	"ISO 8879:1986//ENTITIES Added Math Symbols: Binary Operators//EN"; "ISO 9573-13:1991//ENTITIES Added Math Symbols: Binary Operators//EN"
ISOamsc	"ISO 8879:1986//ENTITIES Added Math Symbols: Delimiters//EN"; "ISO 9573-13:1991//ENTITIES Added Math Symbols: Delimiters//EN"
ISOamsn	"ISO 8879:1986//ENTITIES Added Math Symbols: Negated Relations//EN"; "ISO 9573-13:1991//ENTITIES Added Math Symbols: Negated Relations//EN"
ISOamso	"ISO 8879:1986//ENTITIES Added Math Symbols: Ordinary//EN"; "ISO 9573-13:1991//ENTITIES Added Math Symbols: Ordinary//EN"
ISOamsr	"ISO 8879:1986//ENTITIES Added Math Symbols: Relations//EN"; "ISO 9573-13:1991//ENTITIES Added Math Symbols: Relations//EN"
ISObox	"ISO 8879:1986//ENTITIES Box and Line Drawing//EN"
ISOchem	"ISO 9573-13:1991//ENTITIES Chemistry//EN"
ISOcyr1	"ISO 8879:1986//ENTITIES Russian Cyrillic//EN"
ISOcyr2	"ISO 8879:1986//ENTITIES Non-Russian Cyrillic//EN"
ISOdia	"ISO 8879:1986//ENTITIES Diacritical Marks//EN"
ISOgrk1	"ISO 8879:1986//ENTITIES Greek Letters//EN"
ISOgrk2	"ISO 8879:1986//ENTITIES Monotoniko Greek//EN"
ISOgrk3	"ISO 8879:1986//ENTITIES Greek Symbols//EN"; "ISO 9573-13:1991//ENTITIES Greek Symbols//EN"
ISOgrk4	"ISO 8879:1986//ENTITIES Alternative Greek Symbols//EN"; "ISO 9573-13:1991//ENTITIES Alternative Greek Symbols//EN"
ISOlat1	"ISO 8879:1986//ENTITIES Added Latin 1//EN" (Note: A version with appended //HTML is sometimes erroneously used for the larger HTMLlat1 entity set, i.e. instead of "-//W3C//ENTITIES Latin 1//EN//HTML" (see above).)
ISOlat2	"ISO 8879:1986//ENTITIES Added Latin 2//EN"
ISOmfrk	"ISO 9573-13:1991//ENTITIES Math Alphabets: Fraktur//EN"
ISOmopf	"ISO 9573-13:1991//ENTITIES Math Alphabets: Open Face//EN"
ISOmscr	"ISO 9573-13:1991//ENTITIES Math Alphabets: Script//EN"
ISOnum	"ISO 8879:1986//ENTITIES Numeric and Special Graphic//EN"
ISOpub	"ISO 8879:1986//ENTITIES Publishing//EN"
ISOtech	"ISO 8879:1986//ENTITIES General Technical//EN"; "ISO 9573-13:1991//ENTITIES General Technical//EN"

== List of character entity references in HTML ==
HTML5 defines many named entities, references to which act as mnemonic aliases for certain Unicode characters. The HTML5 specification does not allow users to define additional entities, as it no longer accepts any DTD to be referenced or extended inside HTML documents (this is still needed in XHTML, which is based on stricter XML parsing rules but allows referencing or defining a DTD in the document header, because XML does not predefine most HTML entities).

In the below table, the "Standard" column indicates the first version of the HTML DTD that defines the character entity reference, and indicates characters that are predefined in XML without needing any DTD. To use one of these character entity references in an HTML or XML document, enter an ampersand (&) followed by the entity name, and a semicolon (mandatory in XML, and strongly recommended in HTML for all entities, even if HTML allows omitting the semicolon only from some entities indicated below by), e.g., enter &copy; for the copyright symbol ©.

There are no predefined character entities in HTML for characters or sequences of most scripts encoded in the UCS (except a common subset of whitespace, punctuation, mathematical or technical symbols, currency symbols, a few Hebrew symbols used in mathematical notations, and the most common letters in Latin, Greek or Cyrillic). Note also that not all bidirectional controls defined in UCS/Unicode are represented as standard character entities in HTML (not even in HTML5, which defines more general directional elements and attributes for that purpose). Notably, there are no predefined HTML character entities for controls that were added in the UCS/Unicode and formally defined in version 2 of the Unicode Bidi Algorithm.

Most entities are predefined in XML and HTML to reference just one character in the UCS, but there are no predefined entities for isolated combining characters, variation selectors, or characters for private use assignments; however the list includes some predefined entities for character sequences of two characters containing some of them. Since HTML 5.0 (and MathML 3.0 which shares the same set en entities), all entities are encoded in Unicode normalization forms C and KC (this was not the case with older versions of HTML and MathML, so older entities that were initially defined with characters for private use assignments, CJK compatibility forms, or in non-NFC forms were modified).

However, all valid characters and sequences in the UCS, including all bidirectional controls or private-use assignments (but with the exception of non-whitespace C0 and C1 controls, non-characters, and surrogates) are also usable and valid in HTML, XML, XHTML and MathML, either in plain-text values of attributes or in text elements (by encoding them directly as plain text, or using numeric character references when needed).

All named character entity references in HTML and XML
Entities	Char.	Codepoints	Standard	DTD	Old ISO subset	Description (Note: Description: the standard ISO 10646 and Unicode character name is displayed first for each character, with non-standard but legacy synonyms shown in italics between parentheses after an equal sign.)
&Tab;	TAB	U+0009	HTML 5.0			character tabulation (TAB)
&NewLine;	LF	U+000A	HTML 5.0			line feed (LF)
&DownBreve;	̑	U+0020 U+0311 (Note: The leading space before combining characters used in old DTDs for MathML2.0 was removed in MathML 3.0 and HTML 5.0.); U+0311	MathML 2.0; HTML 5.0			combining inverted breve (combining down breve)
&tdot; &TripleDot;	⃛	U+0020 U+20DB; U+20DB	MathML 2.0; HTML 5.0			combining three dots above
&DotDot;	⃜	U+0020 U+20DC; U+20DC	MathML 2.0; HTML 5.0			combining four dots above
&excl;	!	U+0021	HTML 5.0		ISOnum	exclamation mark
&quot; &QUOT;	"	U+0022	XML 1.0; HTML 5.0	html.dtd (Note: &quot; was omitted from the HTML 3.2 specification, but was restored as of HTML 4.0. In practice, most web browsers displaying HTML 3.2 pages render it as if it had been included in the spec.); HTMLspecial	ISOnum	quotation mark
&num;	#	U+0023	HTML 5.0		ISOnum	number sign
&dollar;	$	U+0024	HTML 5.0		ISOnum	dollar sign
&percnt;	%	U+0025	HTML 5.0		ISOnum	percent sign
&amp; &AMP;	&	U+0026	XML 1.0; HTML 5.0	html.dtd HTMLspecial	ISOnum	ampersand
&apos;	'	U+0027	XML 1.0	HTMLspecial	ISOnum	apostrophe (apostrophe-quote); see below
&lpar;	(	U+0028	HTML 5.0		ISOnum	left parenthesis
&rpar;	)	U+0029	HTML 5.0		ISOnum	right parenthesis
&ast; &midast;	*	U+002A	HTML 5.0		ISOnum	asterisk (middle asterisk)
&plus;	+	U+002B	HTML 5.0		ISOnum	plus sign
&comma;	,	U+002C	HTML 5.0		ISOnum	comma
&period;	.	U+002E	HTML 5.0		ISOnum	full stop (period)
&sol;	/	U+002F	HTML 5.0		ISOnum	solidus
&colon;	:	U+003A	HTML 5.0		ISOnum	colon
&semi;	;	U+003B	HTML 5.0		ISOnum	semicolon
&lt; &LT;	<	U+003C	XML 1.0; HTML 5.0	html.dtd HTMLspecial	ISOnum	less-than sign
&nvlt;	<⃒	U+003C U+20D2	HTML 5.0		ISOamsn	less-than sign, combining long vertical line overlay
&equals;	=	U+003D	HTML 5.0		ISOnum	equals sign
&bne;	=⃥	U+003D U+20E5	HTML 5.0		ISOtech	equals sign, combining reverse solidus overlay
&gt; &GT;	>	U+003E	XML 1.0; HTML 5.0	html.dtd HTMLspecial	ISOnum	greater-than sign
&nvgt;	>⃒	U+003E U+20D2	HTML 5.0		ISOamsn	greater-than sign, combining long vertical line overlay
&quest;	?	U+003F	HTML 5.0		ISOnum	question mark
&commat;	@	U+0040	HTML 5.0		ISOnum	at sign
&lsqb; &lbrack;	[	U+005B	HTML 5.0		ISOnum	left square bracket (left bracket)
&bsol;	\	U+005C	HTML 5.0		ISOnum	reverse solidus (backward solidus)
&rsqb; &rbrack;	]	U+005D	HTML 5.0		ISOnum	right square bracket (right bracket)
&Hat;		U+005E	HTML 5.0			circumflex accent (hat)
&lowbar; &UnderBar;	_	U+005F	HTML 5.0		ISOnum	low line (low bar; &underbar)
&grave; &DiacriticalGrave;	`	U+0060	HTML 5.0		ISOdia	grave accent (diacritical grave)
&fjlig;	fj	U+0066 U+006A	HTML 5.0		ISOpub	latin small letter f, latin small letter j
&lcub; &lbrace;	{	U+007B	HTML 5.0		ISOnum	left curly bracket (left brace)
&verbar; &vert; &VerticalLine;	|	U+007C	HTML 5.0		ISOnum	vertical line (vertical bar), (pipe character)
&rcub; &rbrace;	}	U+007D	HTML 5.0		ISOnum	right curly bracket (right brace)
&nbsp; &NonBreakingSpace;		U+00A0	HTML 3.2; HTML 5.0	HTMLlat1	ISOnum	no-break space (non-breaking space) (Note: spaces: a blue background is used to display each space's width.)
&iexcl;	¡	U+00A1	HTML 3.2	HTMLlat1	ISOnum	inverted exclamation mark
&cent;	¢	U+00A2	HTML 3.2	HTMLlat1	ISOnum	cent sign
&pound;	£	U+00A3	HTML 3.2	HTMLlat1	ISOnum	pound sign
&curren;	¤	U+00A4	HTML 3.2	HTMLlat1	ISOnum	currency sign
&yen;	¥	U+00A5	HTML 3.2	HTMLlat1	ISOnum	yen sign (yuan sign)
&brvbar;	¦	U+00A6	HTML 3.2	HTMLlat1	ISOnum	broken bar (broken vertical bar)
&sect;	§	U+00A7	HTML 3.2	HTMLlat1	ISOnum	section sign
&uml; &Dot; &die; &DoubleDot;	¨	U+00A8	HTML 3.2; HTML 5.0; HTML 5.0; HTML 5.0	HTMLlat1	ISOdia	diaeresis (spacing dieresis, double dot); see also Germanic umlaut
&copy; &COPY;	©	U+00A9	HTML 3.2; HTML 5.0	HTMLlat1	ISOnum	copyright sign (Note: &copy;: U+00A9 'copyright symbol' is not the same as U+24B8 'circled Latin capital letter C', although the same glyph could be used do depict both characters. See also U+24D2 'Latin small letter c'.)
&ordf;	ª	U+00AA	HTML 3.2	HTMLlat1	ISOnum	feminine ordinal indicator
&laquo;	«	U+00AB	HTML 3.2	HTMLlat1	ISOnum	left-pointing double angle quotation mark (left pointing guillemet)
&not;	¬	U+00AC	HTML 3.2	HTMLlat1	ISOnum	not sign
&shy;	SHY	U+00AD	HTML 3.2	HTMLlat1	ISOnum	soft hyphen (discretionary hyphen)
&reg; &REG; &circledR;	®	U+00AE	HTML 3.2; HTML 5.0; HTML 5.0	HTMLlat1	ISOnum	registered sign (registered trademark symbol) (Note: &reg;: U+00AE 'registered sign' is not the same as U+24C7 'circled Latin capital letter R', although the same glyph could be used do depict both characters.)
&macr; &strns;	¯	U+00AF	HTML 3.2; HTML 5.0	HTMLlat1	ISOdia	macron (spacing macron, overline, APL overbar)
&deg;	°	U+00B0	HTML 3.2	HTMLlat1	ISOnum	degree sign
&plusmn; &pm; &PlusMinus;	±	U+00B1	HTML 3.2; HTML 5.0; HTML 5.0	HTMLlat1	ISOnum	plus–minus sign (plus-or-minus sign)
&sup2;	²	U+00B2	HTML 3.2	HTMLlat1	ISOnum	superscript two (superscript digit two, squared)
&sup3;	³	U+00B3	HTML 3.2	HTMLlat1	ISOnum	superscript three (superscript digit three, cubed)
&acute; &DiacriticalAcute;	´	U+00B4	HTML 3.2; HTML 5.0	HTMLlat1	ISOdia	acute accent (diacritical acute, spacing acute)
&micro;	µ	U+00B5	HTML 3.2	HTMLlat1	ISOnum	micro sign
&para;	¶	U+00B6	HTML 3.2	HTMLlat1	ISOnum	pilcrow sign (paragraph sign)
&middot; &centerdot; &CenterDot;	·	U+00B7	HTML 3.2; HTML 5.0; HTML 5.0	HTMLlat1	ISOnum	middle dot (center dot, Georgian comma, Greek middle dot)
&cedil; &Cedilla;	¸	U+00B8	HTML 3.2; HTML 5.0	HTMLlat1	ISOdia	cedilla (spacing cedilla)
&sup1;	¹	U+00B9	HTML 3.2	HTMLlat1	ISOnum	superscript one (superscript digit one)
&ordm;	º	U+00BA	HTML 3.2	HTMLlat1	ISOnum	masculine ordinal indicator
&raquo;	»	U+00BB	HTML 3.2	HTMLlat1	ISOnum	right-pointing double angle quotation mark (right pointing guillemet)
&frac14;	¼	U+00BC	HTML 3.2	HTMLlat1	ISOnum	vulgar fraction one quarter (fraction one quarter)
&frac12; &half;	½	U+00BD	HTML 3.2; HTML 5.0	HTMLlat1	ISOnum	vulgar fraction one half (fraction one half)
&frac34;	¾	U+00BE	HTML 3.2	HTMLlat1	ISOnum	vulgar fraction three quarters (fraction three quarters)
&iquest;	¿	U+00BF	HTML 3.2	HTMLlat1	ISOnum	inverted question mark (turned question mark)
&Agrave;	À	U+00C0	HTML 2.0	HTMLlat1	ISOlat1	Latin capital letter A with grave (Latin capital letter A grave)
&Aacute;	Á	U+00C1	HTML 2.0	HTMLlat1	ISOlat1	Latin capital letter A with acute
&Acirc;	Â	U+00C2	HTML 2.0	HTMLlat1	ISOlat1	Latin capital letter A with circumflex
&Atilde;	Ã	U+00C3	HTML 2.0	HTMLlat1	ISOlat1	Latin capital letter A with tilde
&Auml;	Ä	U+00C4	HTML 2.0	HTMLlat1	ISOlat1	Latin capital letter A with diaeresis
&Aring; &angst;	Å	U+00C5	HTML 2.0; HTML 5.0	HTMLlat1	ISOlat1	Latin capital letter A with ring above (Latin capital letter A ring Angstrom sign (Note: &angst;: The use of U+212B 'Angstrom sign', which was encoded due to round-trip mapping compatibility with an East-Asian character encoding, is discouraged, and the preferred representation is U+00C5 'capital letter A with ring above', which has the same glyph.))
&AElig;	Æ	U+00C6	HTML 2.0	HTMLlat1	ISOlat1	Latin capital letter AE (Latin capital ligature AE)
&Ccedil;	Ç	U+00C7	HTML 2.0	HTMLlat1	ISOlat1	Latin capital letter C with cedilla
&Egrave;	È	U+00C8	HTML 2.0	HTMLlat1	ISOlat1	Latin capital letter E with grave
&Eacute;	É	U+00C9	HTML 2.0	HTMLlat1	ISOlat1	Latin capital letter E with acute
&Ecirc;	Ê	U+00CA	HTML 2.0	HTMLlat1	ISOlat1	Latin capital letter E with circumflex
&Euml;	Ë	U+00CB	HTML 2.0	HTMLlat1	ISOlat1	Latin capital letter E with diaeresis
&Igrave;	Ì	U+00CC	HTML 2.0	HTMLlat1	ISOlat1	Latin capital letter I with grave
&Iacute;	Í	U+00CD	HTML 2.0	HTMLlat1	ISOlat1	Latin capital letter I with acute
&Icirc;	Î	U+00CE	HTML 2.0	HTMLlat1	ISOlat1	Latin capital letter I with circumflex
&Iuml;	Ï	U+00CF	HTML 2.0	HTMLlat1	ISOlat1	Latin capital letter I with diaeresis
&ETH;	Ð	U+00D0	HTML 2.0	HTMLlat1	ISOlat1	Latin capital letter Eth
&Ntilde;	Ñ	U+00D1	HTML 2.0	HTMLlat1	ISOlat1	Latin capital letter N with tilde
&Ograve;	Ò	U+00D2	HTML 2.0	HTMLlat1	ISOlat1	Latin capital letter O with grave
&Oacute;	Ó	U+00D3	HTML 2.0	HTMLlat1	ISOlat1	Latin capital letter O with acute
&Ocirc;	Ô	U+00D4	HTML 2.0	HTMLlat1	ISOlat1	Latin capital letter O with circumflex
&Otilde;	Õ	U+00D5	HTML 2.0	HTMLlat1	ISOlat1	Latin capital letter O with tilde
&Ouml;	Ö	U+00D6	HTML 2.0	HTMLlat1	ISOlat1	Latin capital letter O with diaeresis
&times;	×	U+00D7	HTML 3.2	HTMLlat1	ISOnum	multiplication sign (times sign)
&Oslash;	Ø	U+00D8	HTML 2.0	HTMLlat1	ISOlat1	Latin capital letter O with stroke (Latin capital letter O slash)
&Ugrave;	Ù	U+00D9	HTML 2.0	HTMLlat1	ISOlat1	Latin capital letter U with grave
&Uacute;	Ú	U+00DA	HTML 2.0	HTMLlat1	ISOlat1	Latin capital letter U with acute
&Ucirc;	Û	U+00DB	HTML 2.0	HTMLlat1	ISOlat1	Latin capital letter U with circumflex
&Uuml;	Ü	U+00DC	HTML 2.0	HTMLlat1	ISOlat1	Latin capital letter U with diaeresis
&Yacute;	Ý	U+00DD	HTML 2.0	HTMLlat1	ISOlat1	Latin capital letter Y with acute
&THORN;	Þ	U+00DE	HTML 2.0	HTMLlat1	ISOlat1	Latin capital letter Thorn
&szlig;	ß	U+00DF	HTML 2.0	HTMLlat1	ISOlat1	Latin small letter sharp s (ess-zed); see also German eszett
&agrave;	à	U+00E0	HTML 2.0	HTMLlat1	ISOlat1	Latin small letter a with grave
&aacute;	á	U+00E1	HTML 2.0	HTMLlat1	ISOlat1	Latin small letter a with acute
&acirc;	â	U+00E2	HTML 2.0	HTMLlat1	ISOlat1	Latin small letter a with circumflex
&atilde;	ã	U+00E3	HTML 2.0	HTMLlat1	ISOlat1	Latin small letter a with tilde
&auml;	ä	U+00E4	HTML 2.0	HTMLlat1	ISOlat1	Latin small letter a with diaeresis
&aring;	å	U+00E5	HTML 2.0	HTMLlat1	ISOlat1	Latin small letter a with ring above
&aelig;	æ	U+00E6	HTML 2.0	HTMLlat1	ISOlat1	Latin small letter ae (Latin small ligature ae)
&ccedil;	ç	U+00E7	HTML 2.0	HTMLlat1	ISOlat1	Latin small letter c with cedilla
&egrave;	è	U+00E8	HTML 2.0	HTMLlat1	ISOlat1	Latin small letter e with grave
&eacute;	é	U+00E9	HTML 2.0	HTMLlat1	ISOlat1	Latin small letter e with acute
&ecirc;	ê	U+00EA	HTML 2.0	HTMLlat1	ISOlat1	Latin small letter e with circumflex
&euml;	ë	U+00EB	HTML 2.0	HTMLlat1	ISOlat1	Latin small letter e with diaeresis
&igrave;	ì	U+00EC	HTML 2.0	HTMLlat1	ISOlat1	Latin small letter i with grave
&iacute;	í	U+00ED	HTML 2.0	HTMLlat1	ISOlat1	Latin small letter i with acute
&icirc;	î	U+00EE	HTML 2.0	HTMLlat1	ISOlat1	Latin small letter i with circumflex
&iuml;	ï	U+00EF	HTML 2.0	HTMLlat1	ISOlat1	Latin small letter i with diaeresis
&eth;	ð	U+00F0	HTML 2.0	HTMLlat1	ISOlat1	Latin small letter eth
&ntilde;	ñ	U+00F1	HTML 2.0	HTMLlat1	ISOlat1	Latin small letter n with tilde
&ograve;	ò	U+00F2	HTML 2.0	HTMLlat1	ISOlat1	Latin small letter o with grave
&oacute;	ó	U+00F3	HTML 2.0	HTMLlat1	ISOlat1	Latin small letter o with acute
&ocirc;	ô	U+00F4	HTML 2.0	HTMLlat1	ISOlat1	Latin small letter o with circumflex
&otilde;	õ	U+00F5	HTML 2.0	HTMLlat1	ISOlat1	Latin small letter o with tilde
&ouml;	ö	U+00F6	HTML 2.0	HTMLlat1	ISOlat1	Latin small letter o with diaeresis
&divide; &div;	÷	U+00F7	HTML 3.2; HTML 5.0	HTMLlat1	ISOnum	division sign
&oslash;	ø	U+00F8	HTML 2.0	HTMLlat1	ISOlat1	Latin small letter o with stroke (Latin small letter o slash)
&ugrave;	ù	U+00F9	HTML 2.0	HTMLlat1	ISOlat1	Latin small letter u with grave
&uacute;	ú	U+00FA	HTML 2.0	HTMLlat1	ISOlat1	Latin small letter u with acute
&ucirc;	û	U+00FB	HTML 2.0	HTMLlat1	ISOlat1	Latin small letter u with circumflex
&uuml;	ü	U+00FC	HTML 2.0	HTMLlat1	ISOlat1	Latin small letter u with diaeresis
&yacute;	ý	U+00FD	HTML 2.0	HTMLlat1	ISOlat1	Latin small letter y with acute
&thorn;	þ	U+00FE	HTML 2.0	HTMLlat1	ISOlat1	Latin small letter thorn
&yuml;	ÿ	U+00FF	HTML 2.0	HTMLlat1	ISOlat1	Latin small letter y with diaeresis
&Amacr;	Ā	U+0100	HTML 5.0		ISOlat2	Latin capital letter A with macron
&amacr;	ā	U+0101	HTML 5.0		ISOlat2	Latin small letter a with macron
&Abreve;	Ă	U+0102	HTML 5.0		ISOlat2	Latin capital letter A with breve
&abreve;	ă	U+0103	HTML 5.0		ISOlat2	Latin small letter a with breve
&Aogon;	Ą	U+0104	HTML 5.0		ISOlat2	Latin capital letter A with ogonek
&aogon;	ą	U+0105	HTML 5.0		ISOlat2	Latin small letter a with ogonek
&Cacute;	Ć	U+0106	HTML 5.0		ISOlat2	Latin capital letter C with acute
&cacute;	ć	U+0107	HTML 5.0		ISOlat2	Latin small letter c with acute
&Ccirc;	Ĉ	U+0108	HTML 5.0		ISOlat2	Latin capital letter C with circumflex
&ccirc;	ĉ	U+0109	HTML 5.0		ISOlat2	Latin small letter c with circumflex
&Cdot;	Ċ	U+010A	HTML 5.0		ISOlat2	Latin capital letter C with dot above
&cdot;	ċ	U+010B	HTML 5.0		ISOlat2	Latin small letter c with dot above
&Ccaron;	Č	U+010C	HTML 5.0		ISOlat2	Latin capital letter C with caron
&ccaron;	č	U+010D	HTML 5.0		ISOlat2	Latin small letter c with caron
&Dcaron;	Ď	U+010E	HTML 5.0		ISOlat2	Latin capital letter D with caron
&dcaron;	ď	U+010F	HTML 5.0		ISOlat2	Latin small letter d with caron
&Dstrok;	Đ	U+0110	HTML 5.0		ISOlat2	Latin capital letter D with stroke
&dstrok;	đ	U+0111	HTML 5.0		ISOlat2	Latin small letter d with stroke
&Emacr;	Ē	U+0112	HTML 5.0		ISOlat2	Latin capital letter E with macron
&emacr;	ē	U+0113	HTML 5.0		ISOlat2	Latin small letter e with macron
&Edot;	Ė	U+0116	HTML 5.0		ISOlat2	Latin capital letter E with dot above
&edot;	ė	U+0117	HTML 5.0		ISOlat2	Latin small letter e with dot above
&Eogon;	Ę	U+0118	HTML 5.0		ISOlat2	Latin capital letter E with ogonek
&eogon;	ę	U+0119	HTML 5.0		ISOlat2	Latin small letter e with ogonek
&Ecaron;	Ě	U+011A	HTML 5.0		ISOlat2	Latin capital letter E with caron
&ecaron;	ě	U+011B	HTML 5.0		ISOlat2	Latin small letter e with caron
&Gcirc;	Ĝ	U+011C	HTML 5.0		ISOlat2	Latin capital letter G with circumflex
&gcirc;	ĝ	U+011D	HTML 5.0		ISOlat2	Latin small letter g with circumflex
&Gbreve;	Ğ	U+011E	HTML 5.0		ISOlat2	Latin capital letter G with breve
&gbreve;	ğ	U+011F	HTML 5.0		ISOlat2	Latin small letter g with breve
&Gdot;	Ġ	U+0120	HTML 5.0		ISOlat2	Latin capital letter G with dot above
&gdot;	ġ	U+0121	HTML 5.0		ISOlat2	Latin small letter g with dot above
&Gcedil;	Ģ	U+0122	HTML 5.0		ISOlat2	Latin capital letter G with cedilla
&Hcirc;	Ĥ	U+0124	HTML 5.0		ISOlat2	Latin capital letter H with circumflex
&hcirc;	ĥ	U+0125	HTML 5.0		ISOlat2	Latin small letter h with circumflex
&Hstrok;	Ħ	U+0126	HTML 5.0		ISOlat2	Latin capital letter H with stroke
&hstrok;	ħ	U+0127	HTML 5.0		ISOlat2	Latin small letter h with stroke
&Itilde;	Ĩ	U+0128	HTML 5.0		ISOlat2	Latin capital letter I with tilde
&itilde;	ĩ	U+0129	HTML 5.0		ISOlat2	Latin small letter i with tilde
&Imacr;	Ī	U+012A	HTML 5.0		ISOlat2	Latin capital letter I with macron
&imacr;	ī	U+012B	HTML 5.0		ISOlat2	Latin small letter i with macron
&Iogon;	Į	U+012E	HTML 5.0		ISOlat2	Latin capital letter I with ogonek
&iogon;	į	U+012F	HTML 5.0		ISOlat2	Latin small letter i with ogonek
&Idot;	İ	U+0130	HTML 5.0		ISOlat2	Latin capital letter I with dot above
&inodot; &imath;	ı	U+0131	HTML 5.0		ISOlat2; ISOamso	Latin small letter dotless i (i mathematical)
&IJlig;	Ĳ	U+0132	HTML 5.0		ISOlat2	Latin capital ligature IJ (Note: &IJlig; and &ijlig;: The use of U+0132 'IJ ligature' or U+0133 'ij ligature', which were encoded for usage in Dutch and for compatibility for ISO/IEC 6937 and Code page 1102 (which only includes the lowercase ij, also part of the Dutch version of ISO 646 National Replacement Character Set), is discouraged, and the preferred representation is simply 'IJ' or 'ij' (as two separate letters).)
&ijlig;	ĳ	U+0133	HTML 5.0		ISOlat2	Latin small ligature ij
&Jcirc;	Ĵ	U+0134	HTML 5.0		ISOlat2	Latin capital letter J with circumflex
&jcirc;	ĵ	U+0135	HTML 5.0		ISOlat2	Latin small letter j with circumflex
&Kcedil;	Ķ	U+0136	HTML 5.0		ISOlat2	Latin capital letter K with cedilla
&kcedil;	ķ	U+0137	HTML 5.0		ISOlat2	Latin small letter k with cedilla
&kgreen;	ĸ	U+0138	HTML 5.0		ISOlat2	Latin small letter kra (k greenlandic)
&Lacute;	Ĺ	U+0139	HTML 5.0		ISOlat2	Latin capital letter L with acute
&lacute;	ĺ	U+013A	HTML 5.0		ISOlat2	Latin small letter l with acute
&Lcedil;	Ļ	U+013B	HTML 5.0		ISOlat2	Latin capital letter L with cedilla
&lcedil;	ļ	U+013C	HTML 5.0		ISOlat2	Latin small letter l with cedilla
&Lcaron;	Ľ	U+013D	HTML 5.0		ISOlat2	Latin capital letter L with caron
&lcaron;	ľ	U+013E	HTML 5.0		ISOlat2	Latin small letter l with caron
&Lmidot;	Ŀ	U+013F	HTML 5.0		ISOlat2	Latin capital letter L with middle dot (Note: &lmidot;: The use of U+013F 'Latin small letter l with middle dot' or U+0140 'Latin capital letter L with middle dot', which were encoded for usage in Catalan and for compatibility for ISO/IEC 6937, is discouraged, and the preferred representation is 'L' or 'l', followed by U+00B7.)
&lmidot;	ŀ	U+0140	HTML 5.0		ISOlat2	Latin small letter l with middle dot
&Lstrok;	Ł	U+0141	HTML 5.0		ISOlat2	Latin capital letter L with stroke
&lstrok;	ł	U+0142	HTML 5.0		ISOlat2	Latin small letter l with stroke
&Nacute;	Ń	U+0143	HTML 5.0		ISOlat2	Latin capital letter N with acute
&nacute;	ń	U+0144	HTML 5.0		ISOlat2	Latin small letter n with acute
&Ncedil;	Ņ	U+0145	HTML 5.0		ISOlat2	Latin capital letter N with cedilla
&ncedil;	ņ	U+0146	HTML 5.0		ISOlat2	Latin small letter n with cedilla
&Ncaron;	Ň	U+0147	HTML 5.0		ISOlat2	Latin capital letter N with caron
&ncaron;	ň	U+0148	HTML 5.0		ISOlat2	Latin small letter n with caron
&napos;	ŉ	U+0149	HTML 5.0		ISOlat2	Latin small letter n preceded by apostrophe (Note: &napos;: The use of U+0149 'n preceded by apostrophe', which was encoded for usage in Afrikaans and for compatibility for ISO/IEC 6937, has been deprecated by Unicode (since Unicode 5.2), and the preferred representation is ʼn (U+02BC followed by n). (Unicode.org – Proposal for Additional Deprecated Characters).)
&ENG;	Ŋ	U+014A	HTML 5.0		ISOlat2	Latin capital letter Eng
&eng;	ŋ	U+014B	HTML 5.0		ISOlat2	Latin small letter eng
&Omacr;	Ō	U+014C	HTML 5.0		ISOlat2	Latin capital letter O with macron
&omacr;	ō	U+014D	HTML 5.0		ISOlat2	Latin small letter o with macron
&Odblac;	Ő	U+0150	HTML 5.0		ISOlat2	Latin capital letter O with double acute
&odblac;	ő	U+0151	HTML 5.0		ISOlat2	Latin small letter o with double acute
&OElig;	Œ	U+0152	HTML 4.0	HTMLspecial	ISOlat2	Latin capital ligature OE (Note: ligature: this is a standard misnomer as this is a separate character in some languages.)
&oelig;	œ	U+0153	HTML 4.0	HTMLspecial	ISOlat2	Latin small ligature oe
&Racute;	Ŕ	U+0154	HTML 5.0		ISOlat2	Latin capital letter R with acute
&racute;	ŕ	U+0155	HTML 5.0		ISOlat2	Latin small letter r with acute
&Rcedil;	Ŗ	U+0156	HTML 5.0		ISOlat2	Latin capital letter R with cedilla
&rcedil;	ŗ	U+0157	HTML 5.0		ISOlat2	Latin small letter r with cedilla
&Rcaron;	Ř	U+0158	HTML 5.0		ISOlat2	Latin capital letter R with caron
&rcaron;	ř	U+0159	HTML 5.0		ISOlat2	Latin small letter r with caron
&Sacute;	Ś	U+015A	HTML 5.0		ISOlat2	Latin capital letter S with acute
&sacute;	ś	U+015B	HTML 5.0		ISOlat2	Latin small letter s with acute
&Scirc;	Ŝ	U+015C	HTML 5.0		ISOlat2	Latin capital letter S with circumflex
&scirc;	ŝ	U+015D	HTML 5.0		ISOlat2	Latin small letter s with circumflex
&Scedil;	Ş	U+015E	HTML 5.0		ISOlat2	Latin capital letter S with cedilla
&scedil;	ş	U+015F	HTML 5.0		ISOlat2	Latin small letter s with cedilla
&Scaron;	Š	U+0160	HTML 4.0	HTMLspecial	ISOlat2	Latin capital letter S with caron
&scaron;	š	U+0161	HTML 4.0	HTMLspecial	ISOlat2	Latin small letter s with caron
&Tcedil;	Ţ	U+0162	HTML 5.0		ISOlat2	Latin capital letter T with cedilla
&tcedil;	ţ	U+0163	HTML 5.0		ISOlat2	Latin small letter t with cedilla
&Tcaron;	Ť	U+0164	HTML 5.0		ISOlat2	Latin capital letter T with caron
&tcaron;	ť	U+0165	HTML 5.0		ISOlat2	Latin small letter t with caron
&Tstrok;	Ŧ	U+0166	HTML 5.0		ISOlat2	Latin capital letter T with stroke
&tstrok;	ŧ	U+0167	HTML 5.0		ISOlat2	Latin small letter t with stroke
&Utilde;	Ũ	U+0168	HTML 5.0		ISOlat2	Latin capital letter U with tilde
&utilde;	ũ	U+0169	HTML 5.0		ISOlat2	Latin small letter u with tilde
&Umacr;	Ū	U+016A	HTML 5.0		ISOlat2	Latin capital letter U with macron
&umacr;	ū	U+016B	HTML 5.0		ISOlat2	Latin small letter u with macron
&Ubreve;	Ŭ	U+016C	HTML 5.0		ISOlat2	Latin capital letter U with breve
&ubreve;	ŭ	U+016D	HTML 5.0		ISOlat2	Latin small letter u with breve
&Uring;	Ů	U+016E	HTML 5.0		ISOlat2	Latin capital letter U with ring above
&uring;	ů	U+016F	HTML 5.0		ISOlat2	Latin small letter u with ring above
&Udblac;	Ű	U+0170	HTML 5.0		ISOlat2	Latin capital letter U with double acute
&udblac;	ű	U+0171	HTML 5.0		ISOlat2	Latin small letter u with double acute
&Uogon;	Ų	U+0172	HTML 5.0		ISOlat2	Latin capital letter U with ogonek
&uogon;	ų	U+0173	HTML 5.0		ISOlat2	Latin small letter u with ogonek
&Wcirc;	Ŵ	U+0174	HTML 5.0		ISOlat2	Latin capital letter W with circumflex
&wcirc;	ŵ	U+0175	HTML 5.0		ISOlat2	Latin small letter w with circumflex
&Ycirc;	Ŷ	U+0176	HTML 5.0		ISOlat2	Latin capital letter Y with circumflex
&ycirc;	ŷ	U+0177	HTML 5.0		ISOlat2	Latin small letter y with circumflex
&Yuml;	Ÿ	U+0178	HTML 4.0	HTMLspecial	ISOlat2	Latin capital letter Y with diaeresis
&Zacute;	Ź	U+0179	HTML 5.0		ISOlat2	Latin capital letter Z with acute
&zacute;	ź	U+017A	HTML 5.0		ISOlat2	Latin small letter z with acute
&Zdot;	Ż	U+017B	HTML 5.0		ISOlat2	Latin capital letter Z with dot above
&zdot;	ż	U+017C	HTML 5.0		ISOlat2	Latin small letter z with dot above
&Zcaron;	Ž	U+017D	HTML 5.0		ISOlat2	Latin capital letter Z with caron
&zcaron;	ž	U+017E	HTML 5.0		ISOlat2	Latin small letter z with caron
&fnof;	ƒ	U+0192	HTML 4.0	HTMLsymbol	ISOtech	Latin small letter f with hook (function, florin)
&imped;	Ƶ	U+01B5	HTML 5.0		ISOtech	Latin capital letter Z with stroke
&gacute;	ǵ	U+01F5	HTML 5.0		ISOlat2	Latin small letter g with acute
&jmath;	ȷ	U+0237	HTML 5.0		ISOamso	Latin small letter dotless j (j mathematical)
&circ;	ˆ	U+02C6	HTML 4.0	HTMLspecial	ISOpub	modifier letter circumflex accent
&caron; &Hacek;	ˇ	U+02C7	HTML 5.0		ISOdia	caron (hacek)
&breve; &Breve;	˘	U+02D8	HTML 5.0		ISOdia	breve
&dot; &DiacriticalDot;	˙	U+02D9	HTML 5.0		ISOdia	dot above (diacritical dot)
&ring;	˚	U+02DA	HTML 5.0		ISOdia	ring above
&ogon;	˛	U+02DB	HTML 5.0		ISOdia	ogonek
&tilde; &DiacriticalTilde;	˜	U+02DC	HTML 4.0; HTML 5.0	HTMLspecial	ISOdia	small tilde (diacritical tilde)
&dblac; &DiacriticalDoubleAcute;	˝	U+02DD	HTML 5.0		ISOdia	double acute accent (diacritical double acute)
&Alpha;	Α	U+0391	HTML 4.0	HTMLsymbol	(Note: Greek letters: the ISOgrk1 set includes a set of entity names for the entire Greek alphabet (without diacritics), while the ISOgrk3 set includes a different set of entity names for the subset of the Greek letters used contrastively with Latin letters in mathematical notation. The HTML HTMLsymbol set includes an expanded version of the ISOgrk3 set, not the ISOgrk1 set.)	Greek capital letter Alpha
&Beta;	Β	U+0392	HTML 4.0	HTMLsymbol		Greek capital letter Beta
&Gamma;	Γ	U+0393	HTML 4.0	HTMLsymbol	ISOgrk3	Greek capital letter Gamma
&Delta;	Δ	U+0394	HTML 4.0	HTMLsymbol	ISOgrk3	Greek capital letter Delta
&Epsilon;	Ε	U+0395	HTML 4.0	HTMLsymbol		Greek capital letter Epsilon
&Zeta;	Ζ	U+0396	HTML 4.0	HTMLsymbol		Greek capital letter Zeta
&Eta;	Η	U+0397	HTML 4.0	HTMLsymbol		Greek capital letter Eta
&Theta;	Θ	U+0398	HTML 4.0	HTMLsymbol	ISOgrk3	Greek capital letter Theta
&Iota;	Ι	U+0399	HTML 4.0	HTMLsymbol		Greek capital letter Iota
&Kappa;	Κ	U+039A	HTML 4.0	HTMLsymbol		Greek capital letter Kappa
&Lambda;	Λ	U+039B	HTML 4.0	HTMLsymbol	ISOgrk3	Greek capital letter Lambda
&Mu;	Μ	U+039C	HTML 4.0	HTMLsymbol		Greek capital letter Mu
&Nu;	Ν	U+039D	HTML 4.0	HTMLsymbol		Greek capital letter Nu
&Xi;	Ξ	U+039E	HTML 4.0	HTMLsymbol	ISOgrk3	Greek capital letter Xi
&Omicron;	Ο	U+039F	HTML 4.0	HTMLsymbol		Greek capital letter Omicron
&Pi;	Π	U+03A0	HTML 4.0	HTMLsymbol	ISOgrk3	Greek capital letter Pi
&Rho;	Ρ	U+03A1	HTML 4.0	HTMLsymbol		Greek capital letter Rho
&Sigma;	Σ	U+03A3	HTML 4.0	HTMLsymbol	ISOgrk3	Greek capital letter Sigma
&Tau;	Τ	U+03A4	HTML 4.0	HTMLsymbol		Greek capital letter Tau
&Upsilon;	Υ	U+03A5	HTML 4.0	HTMLsymbol	ISOgrk3	Greek capital letter Upsilon
&Phi;	Φ	U+03A6	HTML 4.0	HTMLsymbol	ISOgrk3	Greek capital letter Phi
&Chi;	Χ	U+03A7	HTML 4.0	HTMLsymbol		Greek capital letter Chi
&Psi;	Ψ	U+03A8	HTML 4.0	HTMLsymbol	ISOgrk3	Greek capital letter Psi
&Omega; &ohm;	Ω	U+03A9	HTML 4.0; HTML 5.0	HTMLsymbol	ISOgrk3	Greek capital letter Omega (Ohm sign (Note: &ohm;: The use of U+2126 'ohm sign', is discouraged, and the preferred representation is U+03A9 'Greek capital letter Omega', which has the same glyph.))
&alpha;	α	U+03B1	HTML 4.0	HTMLsymbol	ISOgrk3	Greek small letter alpha
&beta;	β	U+03B2	HTML 4.0	HTMLsymbol	ISOgrk3	Greek small letter beta
&gamma;	γ	U+03B3	HTML 4.0	HTMLsymbol	ISOgrk3	Greek small letter gamma
&delta;	δ	U+03B4	HTML 4.0	HTMLsymbol	ISOgrk3	Greek small letter delta
&epsi; &epsilon;	ε	U+03B5	HTML 4.0; HTML 5.0	HTMLsymbol	ISOgrk3	Greek small letter epsilon
&zeta;	ζ	U+03B6	HTML 4.0	HTMLsymbol	ISOgrk3	Greek small letter zeta
&eta;	η	U+03B7	HTML 4.0	HTMLsymbol	ISOgrk3	Greek small letter eta
&theta;	θ	U+03B8	HTML 4.0	HTMLsymbol	ISOgrk3	Greek small letter theta
&iota;	ι	U+03B9	HTML 4.0	HTMLsymbol	ISOgrk3	Greek small letter iota
&kappa;	κ	U+03BA	HTML 4.0	HTMLsymbol	ISOgrk3	Greek small letter kappa
&lambda;	λ	U+03BB	HTML 4.0	HTMLsymbol	ISOgrk3	Greek small letter lambda
&mu;	μ	U+03BC	HTML 4.0	HTMLsymbol	ISOgrk3	Greek small letter mu
&nu;	ν	U+03BD	HTML 4.0	HTMLsymbol	ISOgrk3	Greek small letter nu
&xi;	ξ	U+03BE	HTML 4.0	HTMLsymbol	ISOgrk3	Greek small letter xi
&omicron;	ο	U+03BF	HTML 4.0	HTMLsymbol	New	Greek small letter omicron
&pi;	π	U+03C0	HTML 4.0	HTMLsymbol	ISOgrk3	Greek small letter pi
&rho;	ρ	U+03C1	HTML 4.0	HTMLsymbol	ISOgrk3	Greek small letter rho
&sigmav; &varsigma; &sigmaf;	ς	U+03C2	HTML 4.0; HTML 5.0; HTML 5.0	HTMLsymbol	ISOgrk3	Greek small letter final sigma (variant sigma)
&sigma;	σ	U+03C3	HTML 4.0	HTMLsymbol	ISOgrk3	Greek small letter sigma
&tau;	τ	U+03C4	HTML 4.0	HTMLsymbol	ISOgrk3	Greek small letter tau
&upsi; &upsilon;	υ	U+03C5	HTML 4.0; HTML 5.0	HTMLsymbol	ISOgrk3	Greek small letter upsilon
&phi;	φ	U+03C6	HTML 4.0	HTMLsymbol	ISOgrk3	Greek small letter phi
&chi;	χ	U+03C7	HTML 4.0	HTMLsymbol	ISOgrk3	Greek small letter chi
&psi;	ψ	U+03C8	HTML 4.0	HTMLsymbol	ISOgrk3	Greek small letter psi
&omega;	ω	U+03C9	HTML 4.0	HTMLsymbol	ISOgrk3	Greek small letter omega
&thetav; &vartheta; &thetasym;	ϑ	U+03D1	HTML 4.0; HTML 5.0; HTML 5.0	HTMLsymbol	New	Greek theta symbol (variant theta)
&Upsi; &upsih;	ϒ	U+03D2	HTML 4.0; HTML 5.0	HTMLsymbol	New	Greek Upsilon with hook symbol
&phiv; &straightphi; &varphi;	ϕ	U+03D5	HTML 5.0		ISOgrk3	Greek phi symbol (straight phi, variant phi)
&piv; &varpi;	ϖ	U+03D6	HTML 4.0; HTML 5.0	HTMLsymbol	ISOgrk3	Greek pi symbol (variant pi)
&Gammad;	Ϝ	U+03DC	HTML 5.0		ISOgrk3	Greek letter digamma
&gammad; &digamma;	ϝ	U+03DD	HTML 5.0		ISOgrk3	Greek small letter digamma
&kappav; &varkappa;	ϰ	U+03F0	HTML 5.0		ISOgrk3	Greek kappa symbol (variant kappa)
&rhov; &varrho;	ϱ	U+03F1	HTML 5.0		ISOgrk3	Greek rho symbol (variant rho)
&epsiv; &varepsilon; &straightepsilon;	ϵ	U+03F5	HTML 5.0		ISOgrk3	Greek lunate epsilon symbol (epsilon, variant epsilon, straight epsilon)
&bepsi; &backepsilon;	϶	U+03F6	HTML 5.0		ISOamsr	Greek reversed lunate epsilon symbol (back epsilon)
&IOcy;	Ё	U+0401	HTML 5.0		ISOcyr1	Cyrillic capital letter Io
&DJcy;	Ђ	U+0402	HTML 5.0		ISOcyr2	Cyrillic capital letter Dje
&GJcy;	Ѓ	U+0403	HTML 5.0		ISOcyr2	Cyrillic capital letter Gje
&Jukcy;	Є	U+0404	HTML 5.0		ISOcyr2	Cyrillic capital letter Ukrainian Ie
&DScy;	Ѕ	U+0405	HTML 5.0		ISOcyr2	Cyrillic capital letter Dze
&Iukcy;	І	U+0406	HTML 5.0		ISOcyr2	Cyrillic capital letter Byelorussian-Ukrainian I (Ukrainian I)
&YIcy;	Ї	U+0407	HTML 5.0		ISOcyr2	Cyrillic capital letter yi
&Jsercy;	Ј	U+0408	HTML 5.0		ISOcyr2	Cyrillic capital letter Je (Serbian J)
&LJcy;	Љ	U+0409	HTML 5.0		ISOcyr2	Cyrillic capital letter Lje
&NJcy;	Њ	U+040A	HTML 5.0		ISOcyr2	Cyrillic capital letter Nje
&TSHcy;	Ћ	U+040B	HTML 5.0		ISOcyr2	Cyrillic capital letter Tshe
&KJcy;	Ќ	U+040C	HTML 5.0		ISOcyr2	Cyrillic capital letter Kje
&Ubrcy;	Ў	U+040E	HTML 5.0		ISOcyr2	Cyrillic capital letter short U (U breve)
&DZcy;	Џ	U+040F	HTML 5.0		ISOcyr2	Cyrillic capital letter Dzhe
&Acy;	А	U+0410	HTML 5.0		ISOcyr1	Cyrillic capital letter A
&Bcy;	Б	U+0411	HTML 5.0		ISOcyr1	Cyrillic capital letter Be
&Vcy;	В	U+0412	HTML 5.0		ISOcyr1	Cyrillic capital letter Ve
&Gcy;	Г	U+0413	HTML 5.0		ISOcyr1	Cyrillic capital letter Ghe
&Dcy;	Д	U+0414	HTML 5.0		ISOcyr1	Cyrillic capital letter De
&IEcy;	Е	U+0415	HTML 5.0		ISOcyr1	Cyrillic capital letter Ie
&ZHcy;	Ж	U+0416	HTML 5.0		ISOcyr1	Cyrillic capital letter Zhe
&Zcy;	З	U+0417	HTML 5.0		ISOcyr1	Cyrillic capital letter Ze
&Icy;	И	U+0418	HTML 5.0		ISOcyr1	Cyrillic capital letter I
&Jcy;	Й	U+0419	HTML 5.0		ISOcyr1	Cyrillic capital letter short I (J)
&Kcy;	К	U+041A	HTML 5.0		ISOcyr1	Cyrillic capital letter Ka
&Lcy;	Л	U+041B	HTML 5.0		ISOcyr1	Cyrillic capital letter El
&Mcy;	М	U+041C	HTML 5.0		ISOcyr1	Cyrillic capital letter Em
&Ncy;	Н	U+041D	HTML 5.0		ISOcyr1	Cyrillic capital letter En
&Ocy;	О	U+041E	HTML 5.0		ISOcyr1	Cyrillic capital letter O
&Pcy;	П	U+041F	HTML 5.0		ISOcyr1	Cyrillic capital letter Pe
&Rcy;	Р	U+0420	HTML 5.0		ISOcyr1	Cyrillic capital letter Er
&Scy;	С	U+0421	HTML 5.0		ISOcyr1	Cyrillic capital letter Es
&Tcy;	Т	U+0422	HTML 5.0		ISOcyr1	Cyrillic capital letter Te
&Ucy;	У	U+0423	HTML 5.0		ISOcyr1	Cyrillic capital letter U
&Fcy;	Ф	U+0424	HTML 5.0		ISOcyr1	Cyrillic capital letter Ef
&KHcy;	Х	U+0425	HTML 5.0		ISOcyr1	Cyrillic capital letter Ha (Kha)
&TScy;	Ц	U+0426	HTML 5.0		ISOcyr1	Cyrillic capital letter Tse
&CHcy;	Ч	U+0427	HTML 5.0		ISOcyr1	Cyrillic capital letter Che
&SHcy;	Ш	U+0428	HTML 5.0		ISOcyr1	Cyrillic capital letter Sha
&SHCHcy;	Щ	U+0429	HTML 5.0		ISOcyr1	Cyrillic capital letter Shcha
&HARDcy;	Ъ	U+042A	HTML 5.0		ISOcyr1	Cyrillic capital letter Hard Sign
&Ycy;	Ы	U+042B	HTML 5.0		ISOcyr1	Cyrillic capital letter Yeru (Y)
&SOFTcy;	Ь	U+042C	HTML 5.0		ISOcyr1	Cyrillic capital letter Soft Sign
&Ecy;	Э	U+042D	HTML 5.0		ISOcyr1	Cyrillic capital letter E
&YUcy;	Ю	U+042E	HTML 5.0		ISOcyr1	Cyrillic capital letter Yu
&YAcy;	Я	U+042F	HTML 5.0		ISOcyr1	Cyrillic capital letter Ya
&acy;	а	U+0430	HTML 5.0		ISOcyr1	Cyrillic small letter a
&bcy;	б	U+0431	HTML 5.0		ISOcyr1	Cyrillic small letter be
&vcy;	в	U+0432	HTML 5.0		ISOcyr1	Cyrillic small letter ve
&gcy;	г	U+0433	HTML 5.0		ISOcyr1	Cyrillic small letter ghe
&dcy;	д	U+0434	HTML 5.0		ISOcyr1	Cyrillic small letter de
&iecy;	е	U+0435	HTML 5.0		ISOcyr1	Cyrillic small letter ie
&zhcy;	ж	U+0436	HTML 5.0		ISOcyr1	Cyrillic small letter zhe
&zcy;	з	U+0437	HTML 5.0		ISOcyr1	Cyrillic small letter ze
&icy;	и	U+0438	HTML 5.0		ISOcyr1	Cyrillic small letter i
&jcy;	й	U+0439	HTML 5.0		ISOcyr1	Cyrillic small letter short i (j)
&kcy;	к	U+043A	HTML 5.0		ISOcyr1	Cyrillic small letter ka
&lcy;	л	U+043B	HTML 5.0		ISOcyr1	Cyrillic small letter el
&mcy;	м	U+043C	HTML 5.0		ISOcyr1	Cyrillic small letter em
&ncy;	н	U+043D	HTML 5.0		ISOcyr1	Cyrillic small letter en
&ocy;	о	U+043E	HTML 5.0		ISOcyr1	Cyrillic small letter o
&pcy;	п	U+043F	HTML 5.0		ISOcyr1	Cyrillic small letter pe
&rcy;	р	U+0440	HTML 5.0		ISOcyr1	Cyrillic small letter er
&scy;	с	U+0441	HTML 5.0		ISOcyr1	Cyrillic small letter es
&tcy;	т	U+0442	HTML 5.0		ISOcyr1	Cyrillic small letter te
&ucy;	у	U+0443	HTML 5.0		ISOcyr1	Cyrillic small letter u
&fcy;	ф	U+0444	HTML 5.0		ISOcyr1	Cyrillic small letter ef
&khcy;	х	U+0445	HTML 5.0		ISOcyr1	Cyrillic small letter ha (kha)
&tscy;	ц	U+0446	HTML 5.0		ISOcyr1	Cyrillic small letter tse
&chcy;	ч	U+0447	HTML 5.0		ISOcyr1	Cyrillic small letter che
&shcy;	ш	U+0448	HTML 5.0		ISOcyr1	Cyrillic small letter sha
&shchcy;	щ	U+0449	HTML 5.0		ISOcyr1	Cyrillic small letter shcha
&hardcy;	ъ	U+044A	HTML 5.0		ISOcyr1	Cyrillic small letter hard sign
&ycy;	ы	U+044B	HTML 5.0		ISOcyr1	Cyrillic small letter yeru (y)
&softcy;	ь	U+044C	HTML 5.0		ISOcyr1	Cyrillic small letter soft sign
&ecy;	э	U+044D	HTML 5.0		ISOcyr1	Cyrillic small letter e
&yucy;	ю	U+044E	HTML 5.0		ISOcyr1	Cyrillic small letter yu
&yacy;	я	U+044F	HTML 5.0		ISOcyr1	Cyrillic small letter ya
&iocy;	ё	U+0451	HTML 5.0		ISOcyr1	Cyrillic small letter io
&djcy;	ђ	U+0452	HTML 5.0		ISOcyr2	Cyrillic small letter dje
&gjcy;	ѓ	U+0453	HTML 5.0		ISOcyr2	Cyrillic small letter gje
&jukcy;	є	U+0454	HTML 5.0		ISOcyr2	Cyrillic small letter ukrainian ie
&dscy;	ѕ	U+0455	HTML 5.0		ISOcyr2	Cyrillic small letter dze
&iukcy;	і	U+0456	HTML 5.0		ISOcyr2	Cyrillic small letter Byelorussian-Ukrainian i (Ukrainian i)
&yicy;	ї	U+0457	HTML 5.0		ISOcyr2	Cyrillic small letter yi
&jsercy;	ј	U+0458	HTML 5.0		ISOcyr2	Cyrillic small letter je (Serbian j)
&ljcy;	љ	U+0459	HTML 5.0		ISOcyr2	Cyrillic small letter lje
&njcy;	њ	U+045A	HTML 5.0		ISOcyr2	Cyrillic small letter nje
&tshcy;	ћ	U+045B	HTML 5.0		ISOcyr2	Cyrillic small letter tshe
&kjcy;	ќ	U+045C	HTML 5.0		ISOcyr2	Cyrillic small letter kje
&ubrcy;	ў	U+045E	HTML 5.0		ISOcyr2	Cyrillic small letter short u (u breve)
&dzcy;	џ	U+045F	HTML 5.0		ISOcyr2	Cyrillic small letter dzhe
&ensp;		U+2002	HTML 4.0	HTMLspecial	ISOpub	en space
&emsp;		U+2003	HTML 4.0	HTMLspecial	ISOpub	em space
&emsp13;		U+2004	HTML 5.0		ISOpub	three-per-em space (1/3 em space)
&emsp14;		U+2005	HTML 5.0		ISOpub	four-per-em space (1/4 em space)
&numsp;		U+2007	HTML 5.0		ISOpub	figure space (numeric space)
&puncsp;		U+2008	HTML 5.0		ISOpub	punctuation space
&thinsp; &ThinSpace;		U+2009	HTML 4.0; HTML 5.0	HTMLspecial	ISOpub	thin space
&hairsp; &VeryThinSpace;		U+200A	HTML 5.0		ISOpub	hair space (very thin space)
&ZeroWidthSpace; &NegativeVeryThinSpace; (Note: &NegativeMediumSpace;, &NegativeThickSpace;, &NegativeThinSpace;, &NegativeVeryThinSpace;: these are names used in the Wolfram Language for Private Use Area characters with negative advance widths; HTML5 approximates them with the zero-width space.) &NegativeThinSpace; &NegativeMediumSpace; &NegativeThickSpace;	ZWSP	U+200B	HTML 5.0			zero width space (negative space)
&zwnj;	ZWNJ	U+200C	HTML 4.0	HTMLspecial	NEW RFC 2070	zero width non-joiner
&zwj;	ZWJ	U+200D	HTML 4.0	HTMLspecial	NEW RFC 2070	zero width joiner
&lrm;	LRM	U+200E	HTML 4.0	HTMLspecial	NEW RFC 2070	left-to-right mark
&rlm;	RLM	U+200F	HTML 4.0	HTMLspecial	NEW RFC 2070	right-to-left mark
&hyphen; &dash;	‐	U+2010	HTML 5.0		ISOnum	hyphen (Unicode hyphen)
&ndash;	–	U+2013	HTML 4.0	HTMLspecial	ISOpub	en dash
&mdash;	—	U+2014	HTML 4.0	HTMLspecial	ISOpub	em dash
&horbar;	―	U+2015	HTML 5.0		ISOnum	horizontal bar
&Verbar; &Vert;	‖	U+2016	HTML 5.0		ISOtech	double vertical line
&lsquo; &OpenCurlyQuote;	‘	U+2018	HTML 4.0; HTML 5.0	HTMLspecial	ISOnum	left single quotation mark (open curly quote)
&rsquo; &rsquor; &CloseCurlyQuote;	’	U+2019	HTML 4.0; HTML 5.0; HTML 5.0	HTMLspecial	ISOnum	right single quotation mark (close curly quote)
&sbquo; &lsquor;	‚	U+201A	HTML 4.0; HTML 5.0	HTMLspecial	New	single low-9 quotation mark (single baseline quote)
&ldquo; &OpenCurlyDoubleQuote;	“	U+201C	HTML 4.0; HTML 5.0	HTMLspecial	ISOnum	left double quotation mark (open curly double quote)
&rdquo; &rdquor; &CloseCurlyDoubleQuote;	”	U+201D	HTML 4.0; HTML 5.0; HTML 5.0	HTMLspecial	ISOnum	right double quotation mark (close curly double quote)
&bdquo; &ldquor;	„	U+201E	HTML 4.0; HTML 5.0	HTMLspecial	New	double low-9 quotation mark (baseline double quote)
&dagger;	†	U+2020	HTML 4.0	HTMLspecial	ISOpub	dagger (obelisk)
&Dagger; &ddagger;	‡	U+2021	HTML 4.0; HTML 5.0	HTMLspecial	ISOpub	double dagger (double obelisk)
&bull; &bullet;	•	U+2022	HTML 4.0; HTML 5.0	HTMLspecial	ISOpub	bullet (black small circle) (Note: black: here it seems to mean filled as opposed to hollow.)
&nldr;	‥	U+2025	HTML 5.0		ISOpub	two dot leader (n leader)
&hellip; &mldr;	…	U+2026	HTML 4.0; HTML 5.0	HTMLsymbol	ISOpub	horizontal ellipsis (three dot leader, m leader)
&permil;	‰	U+2030	HTML 4.0	HTMLspecial	ISOtech	per mille sign
&pertenk;	‱	U+2031	HTML 5.0		ISOtech	per ten thousand sign (basis point)
&prime;	′	U+2032	HTML 4.0	HTMLsymbol	ISOtech	prime (arcminutes feet)
&Prime;	″	U+2033	HTML 4.0	HTMLsymbol	ISOtech	double prime (arcseconds inches)
&tprime;	‴	U+2034	HTML 5.0		ISOtech	triple prime (thirds, lignes)
&bprime; &backprime;	‵	U+2035	HTML 5.0		ISOamso	reversed prime (back prime)
&lsaquo;	‹	U+2039	HTML 4.0	HTMLspecial	ISO proposed	single left-pointing angle quotation mark (Note: ISO proposed: these characters have been standardized in ISO 10646 after the release of HTML 4.0.)
&rsaquo;	›	U+203A	HTML 4.0	HTMLspecial	ISO proposed	single right-pointing angle quotation mark
&oline; &OverBar;	‾	U+203E	HTML 4.0; HTML 5.0	HTMLsymbol	New	overline (spacing overscore)
&caret;	⁁	U+2041	HTML 5.0		ISOpub	caret insertion point
&hybull;	⁃	U+2043	HTML 5.0		ISOpub	hyphen bullet
&frasl;	/	U+2044	HTML 4.0	HTMLsymbol	New	fraction slash (solidus)
&bsemi;	⁏	U+204F	HTML 5.0		ISOamso	reversed semicolon (backward semicolon)
&qprime;	⁗	U+2057	HTML 5.0		ISOtech	quadruple prime (fourths)
&MediumSpace;		U+205F	HTML 5.0			medium mathematical space (medium space)
&ThickSpace;		U+205F U+200A	HTML 5.0			medium mathematical space, hair space
&NoBreak;	WJ	U+2060	HTML 5.0			word joiner (no break)
&ApplyFunction; &af;	()	U+2061	HTML 5.0			function application (apply function)
&InvisibleTimes; &it;	×	U+2062	HTML 5.0			invisible times
&InvisibleComma; &ic;	,	U+2063	HTML 5.0			invisible separator (invisible comma)
&euro;	€	U+20AC	HTML 4.0	HTMLspecial	New	euro sign
&Copf; &complexes;	ℂ	U+2102	HTML 5.0		ISOmopf	double-struck capital C (Complex number, open-face capital C)
&incare;	℅	U+2105	HTML 5.0		ISOpub	care of
&gscr;	ℊ	U+210A	HTML 5.0		ISOmscr	script small g
&hamilt; &HilbertSpace; &Hscr;	ℋ	U+210B	HTML 5.0		ISOtech	script capital H (Hilbert space, Hamiltonian mechanics)
&Hfr; &Poincareplane;	ℌ	U+210C	HTML 5.0		ISOmfrk	black-letter capital H (Fraktur capital H, Poincare plane)
&Hopf; &quaternions;	ℍ	U+210D	HTML 5.0		ISOmopf	double-struck capital H (Quaternion, open-face capital H)
&planckh;	ℎ	U+210E	HTML 5.0			Planck constant
&planck; &hbar; &plankv; &hslash;	ℏ	U+210F	HTML 5.0		ISOamso	Planck constant over two pi (h bar, h slash, Planck variant)
&Iscr; &imagline;	ℐ	U+2110	HTML 5.0		ISOmscr	script capital I (imaginary line)
&image; (Note: &image;, &map;: these two entity names were defined differently, as file-type icons, in the abandoned specification for HTML version 3.0.) &Im; &imagpart; &Ifr;	ℑ	U+2111	HTML 4.0; HTML 5.0; HTML 5.0; HTML 5.0	HTMLsymbol	ISOamso	black-letter capital I (Fraktur capital I, imaginary part)
&Lscr; &lagran; &Laplacetrf;	ℒ	U+2112	HTML 5.0		ISOmscr	script capital L (Lagrangian mechanics, Laplace transform)
&ell;	ℓ	U+2113	HTML 5.0		ISOamso	script small l (ell, a mathematical symbol)
&Nopf; &naturals;	ℕ	U+2115	HTML 5.0		ISOmopf	double-struck capital N (Natural number, open-face capital N)
&numero;	№	U+2116	HTML 5.0		ISOcyr1	numero sign
&copysr;	℗	U+2117	HTML 5.0		ISOpub	sound recording copyright; or phonogram copyright symbol (Note: &copysr;: U+2117 'sound recording copyright' is not the same as U+24C5 'circled Latin capital letter P', although the same glyph could be used do depict both characters.)
&weierp; &wp;	℘	U+2118	HTML 4.0; HTML 5.0	HTMLsymbol	ISOamso	script capital P (power set, Weierstrass p)
&Popf; &primes;	ℙ	U+2119	HTML 5.0		ISOmopf	double-struck capital P (prime number, open-face capital P)
&Qopf; &rationals;	ℚ	U+211A	HTML 5.0		ISOmopf	double-struck capital Q (rational number, open-face capital Q)
&Rscr; &realine;	ℛ	U+211B	HTML 5.0		ISOmscr	script capital R (Riemann integral, real line)
&real; &Re; &realpart; &Rfr;	ℜ	U+211C	HTML 4.0; HTML 5.0; HTML 5.0; HTML 5.0	HTMLsymbol	ISOamso	black-letter capital R (Fraktur capital R, real part symbol)
&Ropf; &reals;	ℝ	U+211D	HTML 5.0		ISOmopf	double-struck capital R (real number, open-face capital R)
&rx;	℞	U+211E	HTML 5.0		ISOpub	prescription take (Rx)
&trade; &TRADE;	™	U+2122	HTML 4.0; HTML 5.0	HTMLsymbol	ISOnum	trademark symbol; see superscript Latin capital letters TM
&Zopf; &integers;	ℤ	U+2124	HTML 5.0		ISOmopf	double-struck capital Z (integer, open-face capital Z)
&mho;	℧	U+2127	HTML 5.0		ISOamso	inverted ohm sign (mho)
&Zfr; &zeetrf;	ℨ	U+2128	HTML 5.0		ISOmfrk	black-letter capital Z (Fraktur capital Z, dram)
&iiota;	℩	U+2129	HTML 5.0		ISOamso	turned Greek small letter iota (inverted iota)
&bernou; &Bernoullis; &Bscr;	ℬ	U+212C	HTML 5.0		ISOtech	script capital B (Bernoulli polynomials)
&Cfr; &Cayleys;	ℭ	U+212D	HTML 5.0		ISOmfrk	black-letter capital C (Fraktur capital C)
&escr;	ℯ	U+212F	HTML 5.0		ISOmscr	script small e
&Escr; &expectation;	ℰ	U+2130	HTML 5.0		ISOmscr	script capital E (electromotive force, expected value)
&Fscr; &Fouriertrf;	ℱ	U+2131	HTML 5.0		ISOmscr	script capital F (Fourier transform)
&phmmat; &Mellintrf; &Mscr;	ℳ	U+2133	HTML 5.0		ISOtech	script capital M (Mellin transform, M-matrix (physics))
&order; &orderof; &oscr;	ℴ	U+2134	HTML 5.0		ISOtech	script small o (order, of inferior order to)
&alefsym; &aleph;	ℵ	U+2135	HTML 4.0; HTML 5.0	HTMLsymbol; -	New; ISOtech	alef symbol (first transfinite cardinal) (Note: &alefsym;: U+2135 'alef symbol' is not the same as U+05D0 'Hebrew letter alef' (which, unlike the mathematical symbol, has strong right-to-left bidirectional text behaviour), although the same glyph could be used to depict both characters.)
&beth;	ℶ	U+2136	HTML 5.0		ISOamso	bet symbol (beth symbol) (Note: &beth;: U+2136 'bet symbol' is not the same as U+05D1 'Hebrew letter bet' (which, unlike the mathematical symbol, has strong right-to-left bidirectional text behaviour), although the same glyph could be used to depict both characters.)
&gimel;	ℷ	U+2137	HTML 5.0		ISOamso	gimel symbol (Note: &gimel;: U+2137 'gimel symbol' is not the same as U+05D2 'Hebrew letter gimel' (which, unlike the mathematical symbol, has strong right-to-left bidirectional text behaviour), although the same glyph could be used to depict both characters.)
&daleth;	ℸ	U+2138	HTML 5.0		ISOamso	dalet symbol (daleth symbol) (Note: &daleth;: U+2138 'dalet symbol' is not the same as U+05D3 'Hebrew letter dalet' (which, unlike the mathematical symbol, has strong right-to-left bidirectional text behaviour), although the same glyph could be used to depict both characters.)
&CapitalDifferentialD; &DD;	ⅅ	U+2145	HTML 5.0			double-struck italic capital D
&DifferentialD; &dd;	ⅆ	U+2146	HTML 5.0			double-struck italic small d
&ExponentialE; &exponentiale; &ee;	ⅇ	U+2147	HTML 5.0			double-struck italic small e
&ImaginaryI; &ii;	ⅈ	U+2148	HTML 5.0			double-struck italic small i
&frac13;	⅓	U+2153	HTML 5.0		ISOpub	vulgar fraction one third (fraction one third)
&frac23;	⅔	U+2154	HTML 5.0		ISOpub	vulgar fraction two thirds (fraction two thirds)
&frac15;	⅕	U+2155	HTML 5.0		ISOpub	vulgar fraction one fifth (fraction one fifth)
&frac25;	⅖	U+2156	HTML 5.0		ISOpub	vulgar fraction two fifths (fraction two fifths)
&frac35;	⅗	U+2157	HTML 5.0		ISOpub	vulgar fraction three fifths (fraction three fifths)
&frac45;	⅘	U+2158	HTML 5.0		ISOpub	vulgar fraction four fifths (fraction four fifths)
&frac16;	⅙	U+2159	HTML 5.0		ISOpub	vulgar fraction one sixth (fraction one sixth)
&frac56;	⅚	U+215A	HTML 5.0		ISOpub	vulgar fraction five sixths (fraction five sixths)
&frac18;	⅛	U+215B	HTML 5.0		ISOnum	vulgar fraction one eighth (fraction one eighth)
&frac38;	⅜	U+215C	HTML 5.0		ISOnum	vulgar fraction three eighths (fraction three eighths)
&frac58;	⅝	U+215D	HTML 5.0		ISOnum	vulgar fraction five eighths (fraction five eighths)
&frac78;	⅞	U+215E	HTML 5.0		ISOnum	vulgar fraction seven eighths (fraction seven eighths)
&larr; &leftarrow; &LeftArrow; &slarr; &ShortLeftArrow;	←	U+2190	HTML 4.0; HTML 5.0; HTML 5.0; HTML 5.0; HTML 5.0	HTMLsymbol	ISOnum	leftwards arrow
&uarr; &uparrow; &UpArrow; &ShortUpArrow;	↑	U+2191	HTML 4.0; HTML 5.0; HTML 5.0; HTML 5.0	HTMLsymbol	ISOnum	upwards arrow
&rarr; &rightarrow; &RightArrow; &srarr; &ShortRightArrow;	→	U+2192	HTML 4.0; HTML 5.0; HTML 5.0; HTML 5.0; HTML 5.0	HTMLsymbol	ISOnum	rightwards arrow
&darr; &downarrow; &DownArrow; &ShortDownArrow;	↓	U+2193	HTML 4.0; HTML 5.0; HTML 5.0; HTML 5.0	HTMLsymbol	ISOnum	downwards arrow
&harr; &leftrightarrow; &LeftRightArrow;	↔	U+2194	HTML 4.0; HTML 5.0; HTML 5.0	HTMLsymbol	ISOamsa	left right arrow (horizontal arrow)
&varr; &updownarrow; &UpDownArrow;	↕	U+2195	HTML 5.0		ISOamsa	up down arrow (vertical arrow)
&nwarr; &UpperLeftArrow; &nwarrow;	↖	U+2196	HTML 5.0		ISOamsa	north west arrow (upper left arrow)
&nearr; &UpperRightArrow; &nearrow;	↗	U+2197	HTML 5.0		ISOamsa	north east arrow (upper right arrow)
&searr; &searrow; &LowerRightArrow;	↘	U+2198	HTML 5.0		ISOamsa	south east arrow (lower right arrow)
&swarr; &swarrow; &LowerLeftArrow;	↙	U+2199	HTML 5.0		ISOamsa	south west arrow (lower left arrow)
&nlarr; &nleftarrow;	↚	U+219A	HTML 5.0		ISOamsa	leftwards arrow with stroke (not left arrow)
&nrarr; &nrightarrow;	↛	U+219B	HTML 5.0		ISOamsa	rightwards arrow with stroke (not right arrow)
&rarrw; &rightsquigarrow;	↝	U+219D	HTML 5.0		ISOamsa	rightwards wave arrow (rightwards squiggle arrow)
&nrarrw;	↝̸	U+219D U+0338	HTML 5.0		ISOamsa	rightwards wave arrow, combining long solidus overlay
&Larr; &twoheadleftarrow;	↞	U+219E	HTML 5.0		ISOamsa	leftwards two headed arrow
&Uarr;	↟	U+219F	HTML 5.0		ISOamsa	upwards two headed arrow
&Rarr; &twoheadrightarrow;	↠	U+21A0	HTML 5.0		ISOamsa	rightwards two headed arrow
&Darr;	↡	U+21A1	HTML 5.0		ISOamsa	downwards two headed arrow
&larrtl; &leftarrowtail;	↢	U+21A2	HTML 5.0		ISOamsa	leftwards arrow with tail
&rarrtl; &rightarrowtail;	↣	U+21A3	HTML 5.0		ISOamsa	rightwards arrow with tail
&LeftTeeArrow; &mapstoleft;	↤	U+21A4	HTML 5.0			leftwards arrow from bar (maps to leftward, left tee arrow)
&UpTeeArrow; &mapstoup;	↥	U+21A5	HTML 5.0			upwards arrow from bar (maps to upward, up tee arrow)
&map; &RightTeeArrow; &mapsto;	↦	U+21A6	HTML 5.0		ISOamsa	rightwards arrow from bar (maps to, right tee arrow)
&DownTeeArrow; &mapstodown;	↧	U+21A7	HTML 5.0			downwards arrow from bar (maps to downward, down tee arrow)
&larrhk; &hookleftarrow;	↩	U+21A9	HTML 5.0		ISOamsa	leftwards arrow with hook
&rarrhk; &hookrightarrow;	↪	U+21AA	HTML 5.0		ISOamsa	rightwards arrow with hook
&larrlp; &looparrowleft;	↫	U+21AB	HTML 5.0		ISOamsa	leftwards arrow with loop
&rarrlp; &looparrowright;	↬	U+21AC	HTML 5.0		ISOamsa	rightwards arrow with loop
&harrw; &leftrightsquigarrow;	↭	U+21AD	HTML 5.0		ISOamsa	left right wave arrow (horizontal wave arrow, left right squiggle arrow)
&nharr; &nleftrightarrow;	↮	U+21AE	HTML 5.0		ISOamsa	left right arrow with stroke (not horizontal arrow, not left right arrow)
&lsh; &Lsh;	↰	U+21B0	HTML 5.0		ISOamsa	upwards arrow with tip leftwards (left shift)
&rsh; &Rsh;	↱	U+21B1	HTML 5.0		ISOamsa	upwards arrow with tip rightwards (right shift)
&ldsh;	↲	U+21B2	HTML 5.0		ISOamsa	downwards arrow with tip leftwards (left down shift)
&rdsh;	↳	U+21B3	HTML 5.0		ISOamsa	downwards arrow with tip rightwards (right down shift)
&crarr;	↵	U+21B5	HTML 4.0	HTMLsymbol	New	downwards arrow with corner leftwards (carriage return)
&cularr; &curvearrowleft;	↶	U+21B6	HTML 5.0		ISOamsa	anticlockwise top semicircle arrow (curve arrow left)
&curarr; &curvearrowright;	↷	U+21B7	HTML 5.0		ISOamsa	clockwise top semicircle arrow (curve arrow right)
&olarr; &circlearrowleft;	↺	U+21BA	HTML 5.0		ISOamsa	anticlockwise open circle arrow (circle arrow left, open left arrow)
&orarr; &circlearrowright;	↻	U+21BB	HTML 5.0		ISOamsa	clockwise open circle arrow (circle arrow right, open right arrow)
&lharu; &LeftVector; &leftharpoonup;	↼	U+21BC	HTML 5.0		ISOamsa	leftwards harpoon with barb upwards (left vector)
&lhard; &leftharpoondown; &DownLeftVector;	↽	U+21BD	HTML 5.0		ISOamsa	leftwards harpoon with barb downwards (down left vector)
&uharr; &upharpoonright; &RightUpVector;	↾	U+21BE	HTML 5.0		ISOamsa	upwards harpoon with barb rightwards (right up vector)
&uharl; &upharpoonleft; &LeftUpVector;	↿	U+21BF	HTML 5.0		ISOamsa	upwards harpoon with barb leftwards (left up vector)
&rharu; &RightVector; &rightharpoonup;	⇀	U+21C0	HTML 5.0		ISOamsa	rightwards harpoon with barb upwards (right vector)
&rhard; &rightharpoondown; &DownRightVector;	⇁	U+21C1	HTML 5.0		ISOamsa	rightwards harpoon with barb downwards (down right vector)
&dharr; &RightDownVector; &downharpoonright;	⇂	U+21C2	HTML 5.0		ISOamsa	downwards harpoon with barb rightwards (right down vector)
&dharl; &LeftDownVector; &downharpoonleft;	⇃	U+21C3	HTML 5.0		ISOamsa	downwards harpoon with barb leftwards (left down vector)
&rlarr; &rightleftarrows; &RightArrowLeftArrow;	⇄	U+21C4	HTML 5.0		ISOamsa	rightwards arrow over leftwards arrow
&udarr; &UpArrowDownArrow;	⇅	U+21C5	HTML 5.0		ISOamsa	upwards arrow leftwards of downwards arrow
&lrarr; &leftrightarrows; &LeftArrowRightArrow;	⇆	U+21C6	HTML 5.0		ISOamsa	leftwards arrow over rightwards arrow
&llarr; &leftleftarrows;	⇇	U+21C7	HTML 5.0		ISOamsa	leftwards paired arrows
&uuarr; &upuparrows;	⇈	U+21C8	HTML 5.0		ISOamsa	upwards paired arrows
&rrarr; &rightrightarrows;	⇉	U+21C9	HTML 5.0		ISOamsa	rightwards paired arrows
&ddarr; &downdownarrows;	⇊	U+21CA	HTML 5.0		ISOamsa	downwards paired arrows
&lrhar; &ReverseEquilibrium; &leftrightharpoons;	⇋	U+21CB	HTML 5.0		ISOamsa	leftwards harpoon over rightwards harpoon (Reverse Equilibrium)
&rlhar; &rightleftharpoons; &Equilibrium;	⇌	U+21CC	HTML 5.0		ISOamsa	rightwards harpoon over leftwards harpoon (Equilibrium)
&nlArr; &nLeftarrow;	⇍	U+21CD	HTML 5.0		ISOamsa	leftwards double arrow with stroke (not leftwards double arrow)
&nhArr; &nLeftrightarrow;	⇎	U+21CE	HTML 5.0		ISOamsa	left right double arrow with stroke (not horizontal double arrow, not left right double arrow)
&nrArr; &nRightarrow;	⇏	U+21CF	HTML 5.0		ISOamsa	rightwards double arrow with stroke (not rightwards double arrow)
&lArr; &Leftarrow; &DoubleLeftArrow;	⇐	U+21D0	HTML 4.0; HTML 5.0; HTML 5.0	HTMLsymbol	ISOtech	leftwards double arrow (Note: &lArr;: ISO 10646 does not say that 'leftwards double arrow' is the same as the 'is implied by' arrow, but also does not have any other character for that function, so lArr can be used for 'is implied by' as ISOtech suggests.)
&uArr; &Uparrow; &DoubleUpArrow;	⇑	U+21D1	HTML 4.0; HTML 5.0; HTML 5.0	HTMLsymbol	ISOamsa	upwards double arrow
&rArr; &Rightarrow; &Implies; &DoubleRightArrow;	⇒	U+21D2	HTML 4.0; HTML 5.0; HTML 5.0; HTML 5.0	HTMLsymbol	ISOnum	rightwards double arrow (implies) (Note: &rArr;: ISO 10646 does not say that 'rightwards double arrow' is the same as the 'implies' arrow, but also does not have any other character with this function, so rArr can be used for 'implies' as ISOtech suggests.)
&dArr; &Downarrow; &DoubleDownArrow;	⇓	U+21D3	HTML 4.0; HTML 5.0; HTML 5.0	HTMLsymbol	ISOamsa	downwards double arrow
&hArr; &Leftrightarrow; &DoubleLeftRightArrow; &iff;	⇔	U+21D4	HTML 4.0; HTML 5.0; HTML 5.0; HTML 5.0	HTMLsymbol	ISOamsa	left right double arrow (iff)
&vArr; &Updownarrow; &DoubleUpDownArrow;	⇕	U+21D5	HTML 5.0		ISOamsa	up down double arrow
&nwArr;	⇖	U+21D6	HTML 5.0		ISOamsa	north west double arrow
&neArr;	⇗	U+21D7	HTML 5.0		ISOamsa	north east double arrow
&seArr;	⇘	U+21D8	HTML 5.0		ISOamsa	south east double arrow
&swArr;	⇙	U+21D9	HTML 5.0		ISOamsa	south west double arrow
&lAarr; &Lleftarrow;	⇚	U+21DA	HTML 5.0		ISOamsa	leftwards triple arrow
&rAarr; &Rrightarrow;	⇛	U+21DB	HTML 5.0		ISOamsa	rightwards triple arrow
&zigrarr;	⇝	U+21DD	HTML 5.0		ISOamsa	rightwards squiggle arrow (rightwards zigzag arrow)
&larrb; &LeftArrowBar;	⇤	U+21E4	HTML 5.0			leftwards arrow to bar
&rarrb; &RightArrowBar;	⇥	U+21E5	HTML 5.0			rightwards arrow to bar
&duarr; &DownArrowUpArrow;	⇵	U+21F5	HTML 5.0		ISOamsa	downwards arrow leftwards of upwards arrow
&loarr;	⇽	U+21FD	HTML 5.0		ISOamsa	leftwards open-headed arrow
&roarr;	⇾	U+21FE	HTML 5.0		ISOamsa	rightwards open-headed arrow
&hoarr;	⇿	U+21FF	HTML 5.0		ISOamsa	left right open-headed arrow (horizontal open-headed arrow)
&forall; &ForAll;	∀	U+2200	HTML 4.0; HTML 5.0	HTMLsymbol	ISOtech	for all
&comp; &complement;	∁	U+2201	HTML 5.0		ISOamso	complement
&part; &PartialD;	∂	U+2202	HTML 4.0; HTML 5.0	HTMLsymbol	ISOtech	partial differential
&npart;	∂̸	U+2202 U+0338	HTML 5.0		ISOtech	partial differential, combining long solidus overlay
&exist; &Exists;	∃	U+2203	HTML 4.0; HTML 5.0	HTMLsymbol	ISOtech	there exists
&nexist; &NotExists; &nexists;	∄	U+2204	HTML 5.0		ISOamso	there does not exist
&empty; &emptyset; &emptyv; &varnothing;	∅	U+2205	HTML 4.0; HTML 5.0; HTML 5.0; HTML 5.0	HTMLsymbol	ISOamso	empty set (null set, empty variable, variable nothing); see also U+8960, ⌀
&nabla; &Del;	∇	U+2207	HTML 4.0; HTML 5.0	HTMLsymbol	ISOtech	nabla (del, vector differential operator)
&isin; &isinv; &Element; &in;	∈	U+2208	HTML 4.0; HTML 5.0; HTML 5.0; HTML 5.0	HTMLsymbol	ISOtech	element of (in set)
&notin; &NotElement; &notinva;	∉	U+2209	HTML 4.0; HTML 5.0; HTML 5.0	HTMLsymbol	ISOtech	not an element of (not in set)
&niv; &ReverseElement; &ni; &SuchThat;	∋	U+220B	HTML 4.0; HTML 5.0; HTML 5.0; HTML 5.0	HTMLsymbol	ISOtech	contains as member (Reversed element, Reversed in set, such that)
&notni; &notniva; &NotReverseElement;	∌	U+220C	HTML 5.0		ISOtech	does not contain as member (Not reversed element, nor reversed in set)
&prod; &Product;	∏	U+220F	HTML 4.0; HTML 5.0	HTMLsymbol	ISOamsb	n-ary product (product sign) (Note: &prod;: U+220F 'n-ary product' is not the same character as U+03A0 'Greek capital letter Pi' though the same glyph might be used for both.)
&coprod; &Coproduct;	∐	U+2210	HTML 5.0		ISOamsb	n-ary coproduct (coproduct sign)
&sum; &Sum;	∑	U+2211	HTML 4.0; HTML 5.0	HTMLsymbol	ISOamsb	n-ary summation (Note: &sum;: U+2211 'n-ary summation' is not the same character as U+03A3 'Greek capital letter Sigma' though the same glyph might be used for both.)
&minus;	−	U+2212	HTML 4.0	HTMLsymbol	ISOtech	minus sign
&mnplus; &mp; &MinusPlus;	∓	U+2213	HTML 5.0		ISOtech	minus-or-plus sign (minus–plus sign)
&plusdo; &dotplus;	∔	U+2214	HTML 5.0		ISOamsb	dot plus (dot plus sign, plus dot sign)
&setmn; &setminus; &Backslash; &ssetmn; &smallsetminus;	∖	U+2216	HTML 5.0		ISOamsb	set minus
&lowast;	∗	U+2217	HTML 4.0	HTMLsymbol	ISOtech	asterisk operator
&compfn; &SmallCircle;	∘	U+2218	HTML 5.0		ISOtech	ring operator (composition function, small circle)
&radic; &Sqrt;	√	U+221A	HTML 4.0; HTML 5.0	HTMLsymbol	ISOtech	square root (radical sign)
&prop; &propto; &Proportional; &vprop; &varpropto;	∝	U+221D	HTML 4.0; HTML 5.0; HTML 5.0; HTML 5.0; HTML 5.0	HTMLsymbol	ISOtech	proportional to
&infin;	∞	U+221E	HTML 4.0	HTMLsymbol	ISOtech	infinity
&angrt;	∟	U+221F	HTML 5.0		ISOtech	right angle
&ang; &angle;	∠	U+2220	HTML 4.0; HTML 5.0	HTMLsymbol	ISOamso	angle
&nang;	∠⃒	U+2220 U+20D2	HTML 5.0		ISOamso	angle, combining long vertical line overlay
&angmsd; &measuredangle;	∡	U+2221	HTML 5.0		ISOamso	measured angle
&angsph;	∢	U+2222	HTML 5.0		ISOtech	spherical angle
&mid; &VerticalBar; &smid; &shortmid;	∣	U+2223	HTML 5.0		ISOamsr	divides (vertical bar, mid, short mid)
&nmid; &NotVerticalBar; &nsmid; &nshortmid;	∤	U+2224	HTML 5.0		ISOamsn	does not divide (not vertical bar, not mid, not short mid)
&par; &parallel; &DoubleVerticalBar; &spar; &shortparallel;	∥	U+2225	HTML 5.0		ISOtech	parallel to (double vertical bar)
&npar; &nparallel; &NotDoubleVerticalBar; &nspar; &nshortparallel;	∦	U+2226	HTML 5.0		ISOamsn	not parallel to (not double vertical bar)
&and; &wedge;	∧	U+2227	HTML 4.0; HTML 5.0	HTMLsymbol	ISOtech	logical and (wedge)
&or; &vee;	∨	U+2228	HTML 4.0; HTML 5.0	HTMLsymbol	ISOtech	logical or (vee)
&cap;	∩	U+2229	HTML 4.0	HTMLsymbol	ISOtech	intersection (cap)
&caps;	∩︀	U+2229 U+FE00	HTML 5.0		ISOamsb	intersection, variation selector-1
&cup;	∪	U+222A	HTML 4.0	HTMLsymbol	ISOtech	union (cup)
&cups;	∪︀	U+222A U+FE00	HTML 5.0		ISOamsb	union, variation selector-1
&int; &Integral;	∫	U+222B	HTML 4.0; HTML 5.0	HTMLsymbol	ISOtech	integral
&Int;	∬	U+222C	HTML 5.0		ISOtech	double integral
&tint; &iiint;	∭	U+222D	HTML 5.0		ISOtech	triple integral
&conint; &oint; &ContourIntegral;	∮	U+222E	HTML 5.0		ISOtech	contour integral (circle integral)
&Conint; &DoubleContourIntegral;	∯	U+222F	HTML 5.0		ISOtech	surface integral (double contour integral)
&Cconint;	∰	U+2230	HTML 5.0		ISOtech	volume integral
&cwint;	∱	U+2231	HTML 5.0		ISOtech	clockwise integral
&cwconint; &ClockwiseContourIntegral;	∲	U+2232	HTML 5.0		ISOtech	clockwise contour integral
&awconint; &CounterClockwiseContourIntegral;	∳	U+2233	HTML 5.0		ISOtech	anticlockwise contour integral
&there4; &therefore; &Therefore;	∴	U+2234	HTML 4.0; HTML 5.0; HTML 5.0	HTMLsymbol	ISOtech	therefore
&becaus; &because; &Because;	∵	U+2235	HTML 5.0		ISOtech	because
&ratio;	∶	U+2236	HTML 5.0		ISOamsr	ratio
&Colon; &Proportion;	∷	U+2237	HTML 5.0		ISOamsr	proportion
&minusd; &dotminus;	∸	U+2238	HTML 5.0		ISOamsb	dot minus
&mDDot;	∺	U+223A	HTML 5.0		ISOamsr	geometric proportion
&homtht;	∻	U+223B	HTML 5.0		ISOamsr	homothetic
&sim; &Tilde; &thksim; &thicksim;	∼	U+223C	HTML 4.0; HTML 5.0; HTML 5.0; HTML 5.0	HTMLsymbol	ISOtech	tilde operator (varies with, similar to, thick tilde) (Note: &sim;: U+223C 'tilde operator' is not the same character as U+007E 'tilde', although the same glyph might be used to represent both.)
&nvsim;	∼⃒	U+223C U+20D2	HTML 5.0		ISOamsn	tilde operator, combining long vertical line overlay
&bsim; &backsim;	∽	U+223D	HTML 5.0		ISOamsr	reversed tilde (back similar to)
&race;	∽̱	U+223D U+0331	HTML 5.0			reversed tilde, combining macron below
&ac; &mstpos;	∾	U+223E	HTML 5.0		ISOamsb	inverted lazy s
&acE;	∾̳	U+223E U+0333	HTML 5.0			inverted lazy s, combining double low line
&acd;	∿	U+223F	HTML 5.0		ISOtech	sine wave
&wreath; &VerticalTilde; &wr;	≀	U+2240	HTML 5.0		ISOamsb	wreath product (vertical tilde)
&nsim; &NotTilde;	≁	U+2241	HTML 5.0		ISOamsn	not tilde (is not similar to)
&esim; &EqualTilde; &eqsim;	≂	U+2242	HTML 5.0		ISOamsr	minus tilde (equal tilde)
&nesim; &NotEqualTilde;	≂̸	U+2242 U+0338	HTML 5.0			minus tilde, combining long solidus overlay
&sime; &TildeEqual; &simeq;	≃	U+2243	HTML 5.0		ISOtech	asymptotically equal to (tilde equal)
&nsime; &nsimeq; &NotTildeEqual;	≄	U+2244	HTML 5.0		ISOamsn	not asymptotically equal to (not tilde equal)
&cong; &TildeFullEqual;	≅	U+2245	HTML 4.0; HTML 5.0	HTMLsymbol	ISOtech	approximately equal to (congruent to)
&simne;	≆	U+2246	HTML 5.0		ISOamsn	approximately but not actually equal to (similar but not equal to)
&ncong; &NotTildeFullEqual;	≇	U+2247	HTML 5.0		ISOamsn	neither approximately nor actually equal to (not congruent to)
&asymp; &ap; &TildeTilde; &approx; &thkap; &thickapprox;	≈	U+2248	HTML 4.0; HTML 5.0; HTML 5.0; HTML 5.0; HTML 5.0; HTML 5.0	HTMLsymbol	ISOamsr	almost equal to (asymptotic to, approximately, tilde over tilde)
&nap; &NotTildeTilde; &napprox;	≉	U+2249	HTML 5.0		ISOamsn	not almost equal to (not approximately, not tilde over tilde)
&ape; &approxeq;	≊	U+224A	HTML 5.0		ISOamsr	almost equal or equal to (approximately equal to)
&apid;	≋	U+224B	HTML 5.0		ISOamsr	triple tilde
&napid;	≋̸	U+224B U+0338	HTML 5.0		ISOamsn	triple tilde, combining long solidus overlay
&bcong; &backcong;	≌	U+224C	HTML 5.0		ISOamsr	all equal to (backwards congruent to)
&asympeq; &CupCap;	≍	U+224D	HTML 5.0			equivalent to (asymptotically equivalent to, Cup and Cap)
&nvap;	≍⃒	U+224D U+20D2	HTML 5.0		ISOamsn	equivalent to, combining long vertical line overlay
&bump; &HumpDownHump; &Bumpeq;	≎	U+224E	HTML 5.0		ISOamsr	geometrically equivalent to (bump equals, hump and down hump equals)
&nbump; &NotHumpDownHump;	≎̸	U+224E U+0338	HTML 5.0			geometrically equivalent to, combining long solidus overlay
&bumpe; &HumpEqual; &bumpeq;	≏	U+224F	HTML 5.0		ISOamsr	difference between (hump equals)
&nbumpe; &NotHumpEqual;	≏̸	U+224F U+0338	HTML 5.0			difference between, combining long solidus overlay
&esdot; &DotEqual; &doteq;	≐	U+2250	HTML 5.0		ISOamsr	approaches the limit (dot equal)
&nedot;	≐̸	U+2250 U+0338	HTML 5.0		ISOtech	approaches the limit, combining long solidus overlay
&eDot; &doteqdot;	≑	U+2251	HTML 5.0		ISOamsr	geometrically equal to (dot equal dot)
&efDot; &fallingdotseq;	≒	U+2252	HTML 5.0		ISOamsr	approximately equal to or the image of (falling dot sequence)
&erDot; &risingdotseq;	≓	U+2253	HTML 5.0		ISOamsr	image of or approximately equal to (rising dot sequence)
&colone; &coloneq; &Assign;	≔	U+2254	HTML 5.0		ISOamsr	colon equals (Assignment (computer science))
&ecolon; &eqcolon;	≕	U+2255	HTML 5.0		ISOamsr	equals colon
&ecir; &eqcirc;	≖	U+2256	HTML 5.0		ISOamsr	ring in equal to (equals circle)
&cire; &circeq;	≗	U+2257	HTML 5.0		ISOamsr	ring equal to (circle equals)
&wedgeq;	≙	U+2259	HTML 5.0		ISOtech	estimates (wedge equals)
&veeeq;	≚	U+225A	HTML 5.0		ISOtech	equiangular to (vee equals)
&trie; &triangleq;	≜	U+225C	HTML 5.0		ISOamsr	delta equal to (triangle equals)
&equest; &questeq;	≟	U+225F	HTML 5.0		ISOamsr	questioned equal to
&ne; &NotEqual;	≠	U+2260	HTML 4.0; HTML 5.0	HTMLsymbol	ISOtech	not equal to
&equiv; &Congruent;	≡	U+2261	HTML 4.0; HTML 5.0	HTMLsymbol	ISOtech	identical to; sometimes used for 'equivalent to' or 'congruent'
&bnequiv;	≡⃥	U+2261 U+20E5	HTML 5.0		ISOtech	identical to, combining reverse solidus overlay
&nequiv; &NotCongruent;	≢	U+2262	HTML 5.0		ISOamsn	not identical to; sometimes used for 'not congruent'
&le; &leq;	≤	U+2264	HTML 4.0; HTML 5.0	HTMLsymbol	ISOtech	less-than or equal to
&nvle;	≤⃒	U+2264 U+20D2	HTML 5.0		ISOamsn	less-than or equal to, combining long vertical line overlay
&ge; &GreaterEqual; &geq;	≥	U+2265	HTML 4.0; HTML 5.0; HTML 5.0	HTMLsymbol	ISOtech	greater-than or equal to
&nvge;	≥⃒	U+2265 U+20D2	HTML 5.0		ISOamsn	greater-than or equal to, combining long vertical line overlay
&lE; &LessFullEqual; &leqq;	≦	U+2266	HTML 5.0		ISOamsr	less-than over equal to
&nlE; &nleqq;	≦̸	U+2266 U+0338	HTML 5.0		ISOamsn	less-than over equal to, combining long solidus overlay
&gE; &GreaterFullEqual; &geqq;	≧	U+2267	HTML 5.0		ISOamsr	greater-than over equal to
&ngE; &ngeqq; &NotGreaterFullEqual;	≧̸	U+2267 U+0338	HTML 5.0		ISOamsn	greater-than over equal to, combining long solidus overlay
&lnE; &lneqq;	≨	U+2268	HTML 5.0		ISOamsn	less-than but not equal to
&lvnE; &lvertneqq;	≨︀	U+2268 U+FE00	HTML 5.0		ISOamsn	less-than but not equal to, variation selector-1
&gnE; &gneqq;	≩	U+2269	HTML 5.0		ISOamsn	greater-than but not equal to
&gvnE; &gvertneqq;	≩︀	U+2269 U+FE00	HTML 5.0		ISOamsn	greater-than but not equal to, variation selector-1
&Lt; &NestedLessLess; &ll;	≪	U+226A	HTML 5.0		ISOamsr	much less-than
&nLtv; &NotLessLess;	≪̸	U+226A U+0338	HTML 5.0		ISOamsn	much less-than, combining long solidus overlay
&nLt;	≪⃒	U+226A U+20D2	HTML 5.0		ISOamsn	much less-than, combining long vertical line overlay
&Gt; &NestedGreaterGreater; &gg;	≫	U+226B	HTML 5.0		ISOamsr	much greater-than
&nGtv; &NotGreaterGreater;	≫̸	U+226B U+0338	HTML 5.0		ISOamsn	much greater-than, combining long solidus overlay
&nGt;	≫⃒	U+226B U+20D2	HTML 5.0		ISOamsn	much greater-than, combining long vertical line overlay
&twixt; &between;	≬	U+226C	HTML 5.0		ISOamsr	between
&NotCupCap;	≭	U+226D	HTML 5.0			not equivalent to (not cup cap)
&nlt; &NotLess; &nless;	≮	U+226E	HTML 5.0		ISOamsn	not less-than
&ngt; &NotGreater; &ngtr;	≯	U+226F	HTML 5.0		ISOamsn	not greater-than
&nle; &NotLessEqual; &nleq;	≰	U+2270	HTML 5.0		ISOamsn	neither less-than nor equal to
&nge; &NotGreaterEqual; &ngeq;	≱	U+2271	HTML 5.0		ISOamsn	neither greater-than nor equal to
&lsim; &LessTilde; &lesssim;	≲	U+2272	HTML 5.0		ISOamsr	less-than or equivalent to (less-than tilde, less-than or similar to)
&gsim; &gtrsim; &GreaterTilde;	≳	U+2273	HTML 5.0		ISOamsr	greater-than or equivalent to (greater-than tilde, greater-than or similar to)
&nlsim; &NotLessTilde;	≴	U+2274	HTML 5.0		ISOamsn	neither less-than nor equivalent to (not less-than tilde, neither less-than nor similar to)
&ngsim; &NotGreaterTilde;	≵	U+2275	HTML 5.0		ISOamsn	neither greater-than nor equivalent to (not greater-than tilde, neither greater-than nor similar to)
&lg; &lessgtr; &LessGreater;	≶	U+2276	HTML 5.0		ISOamsr	less-than or greater-than
&gl; &gtrless; &GreaterLess;	≷	U+2277	HTML 5.0		ISOamsr	greater-than or less-than
&ntlg; &NotLessGreater;	≸	U+2278	HTML 5.0		ISOamsn	neither less-than nor greater-than
&ntgl; &NotGreaterLess;	≹	U+2279	HTML 5.0		ISOamsn	neither greater-than nor less-than
&pr; &Precedes; &prec;	≺	U+227A	HTML 5.0		ISOamsr	precedes
&sc; &Succeeds; &succ;	≻	U+227B	HTML 5.0		ISOamsr	succeeds
&prcue; &PrecedesSlantEqual; &preccurlyeq;	≼	U+227C	HTML 5.0		ISOamsr	precedes or equal to (precedes curly equals, precedes slant equals)
&sccue; &SucceedsSlantEqual; &succcurlyeq;	≽	U+227D	HTML 5.0		ISOamsr	succeeds or equal to (succeeds curly equals, succeeds slant equals)
&prsim; &precsim; &PrecedesTilde;	≾	U+227E	HTML 5.0		ISOamsr	precedes or equivalent to (precedes or similar to, precedes tilde)
&scsim; &succsim; &SucceedsTilde;	≿	U+227F	HTML 5.0		ISOamsr	succeeds or equivalent to (succeeds or similar to, succeeds tilde)
&NotSucceedsTilde;	≿̸	U+227F U+0338	HTML 5.0			succeeds or equivalent to, combining long solidus overlay
&npr; &nprec; &NotPrecedes;	⊀	U+2280	HTML 5.0		ISOamsn	does not precede
&nsc; &nsucc; &NotSucceeds;	⊁	U+2281	HTML 5.0		ISOamsn	does not succeed
&sub; &subset;	⊂	U+2282	HTML 4.0; HTML 5.0	HTMLsymbol	ISOtech	subset of
&vnsub; &NotSubset; &nsubset;	⊂⃒	U+2282 U+20D2	HTML 5.0		ISOamsn	subset of, combining long vertical line overlay
&sup; &supset; &Superset;	⊃	U+2283	HTML 4.0; HTML 5.0; HTML 5.0	HTMLsymbol	ISOtech	superset of
&vnsup; &NotSuperset; &nsupset;	⊃⃒	U+2283 U+20D2	HTML 5.0		ISOamsn	superset of, combining long vertical line overlay
&nsub;	⊄	U+2284	HTML 4.0	HTMLsymbol	ISOamsn	not a subset of
&nsup;	⊅	U+2285	HTML 4.0	HTMLsymbol	ISOamsn	not a superset of (Note: &nsup;: U+2285 'not a superset of' is in the 'ISOamsn' subset, but is not covered by the Symbol font encoding, and is not listed in the HTML 4.0 entities list on the documentation, where it was erroneously omitted; it should be included for symmetry and analogy with other entities.)
&sube; &SubsetEqual; &subseteq;	⊆	U+2286	HTML 4.0; HTML 5.0; HTML 5.0	HTMLsymbol	ISOtech	subset of or equal to
&supe; &supseteq; &SupersetEqual;	⊇	U+2287	HTML 4.0; HTML 5.0; HTML 5.0	HTMLsymbol	ISOtech	superset of or equal to
&nsube; &nsubseteq; &NotSubsetEqual;	⊈	U+2288	HTML 5.0		ISOamsn	neither a subset of nor equal to
&nsupe; &nsupseteq; &NotSupersetEqual;	⊉	U+2289	HTML 5.0		ISOamsn	neither a superset of nor equal to
&subne; &subsetneq;	⊊	U+228A	HTML 5.0		ISOamsn	subset of with not equal to
&vsubne; &varsubsetneq;	⊊︀	U+228A U+FE00	HTML 5.0		ISOamsn	subset of with not equal to, variation selector-1
&supne; &supsetneq;	⊋	U+228B	HTML 5.0		ISOamsn	superset of with not equal to
&vsupne; &varsupsetneq;	⊋︀	U+228B U+FE00	HTML 5.0		ISOamsn	superset of with not equal to, variation selector-1
&cupdot;	⊍	U+228D	HTML 5.0		ISOamsb	multiset multiplication (cup dot)
&uplus; &UnionPlus;	⊎	U+228E	HTML 5.0		ISOamsb	multiset union (union plus)
&sqsub; &SquareSubset; &sqsubset;	⊏	U+228F	HTML 5.0		ISOamsr	square image of (square subset)
&NotSquareSubset;	⊏̸	U+228F U+0338	HTML 5.0			square image of, combining long solidus overlay
&sqsup; &SquareSuperset; &sqsupset;	⊐	U+2290	HTML 5.0		ISOamsr	square original of (square superset)
&NotSquareSuperset;	⊐̸	U+2290 U+0338	HTML 5.0			square original of, combining long solidus overlay
&sqsube; &SquareSubsetEqual; &sqsubseteq;	⊑	U+2291	HTML 5.0		ISOamsr	square image of or equal to (square subset equal)
&sqsupe; &SquareSupersetEqual; &sqsupseteq;	⊒	U+2292	HTML 5.0		ISOamsr	square original of or equal to (square superset equal)
&sqcap; &SquareIntersection;	⊓	U+2293	HTML 5.0		ISOamsb	square cap (square intersection)
&sqcaps;	⊓︀	U+2293 U+FE00	HTML 5.0		ISOamsb	square cap, variation selector-1
&sqcup; &SquareUnion;	⊔	U+2294	HTML 5.0		ISOamsb	square cup (square union)
&sqcups;	⊔︀	U+2294 U+FE00	HTML 5.0		ISOamsb	square cup, variation selector-1
&oplus; &CirclePlus;	⊕	U+2295	HTML 4.0; HTML 5.0	HTMLsymbol	ISOamsb	circled plus (direct sum)
&ominus; &CircleMinus;	⊖	U+2296	HTML 5.0		ISOamsb	circled minus
&otimes; &CircleTimes;	⊗	U+2297	HTML 4.0; HTML 5.0	HTMLsymbol	ISOamsb	circled times (vector product)
&osol;	⊘	U+2298	HTML 5.0		ISOamsb	circled division slash (circled solidus)
&odot; &CircleDot;	⊙	U+2299	HTML 5.0		ISOamsb	circled dot operator (circled dot)
&ocir; &circledcirc;	⊚	U+229A	HTML 5.0		ISOamsb	circled ring operator (circled circle)
&oast; &circledast;	⊛	U+229B	HTML 5.0		ISOamsb	circled asterisk operator
&odash; &circleddash;	⊝	U+229D	HTML 5.0		ISOamsb	circled dash
&plusb; &boxplus;	⊞	U+229E	HTML 5.0		ISOamsb	squared plus (boxed plus)
&minusb; &boxminus;	⊟	U+229F	HTML 5.0		ISOamsb	squared minus (boxed minus)
&timesb; &boxtimes;	⊠	U+22A0	HTML 5.0		ISOamsb	squared times (boxed times)
&sdotb; &dotsquare;	⊡	U+22A1	HTML 5.0		ISOamsb	squared dot operator (boxed small dot)
&vdash; &RightTee;	⊢	U+22A2	HTML 5.0		ISOamsr	right tack (proves, right tee)
&dashv; &LeftTee;	⊣	U+22A3	HTML 5.0		ISOamsr	left tack (left tee)
&top; &DownTee;	⊤	U+22A4	HTML 5.0		ISOtech; ISOamsb	down tack (top tack, down tee)
&bottom; &bot; &perp; &UpTee;	⊥	U+22A5	HTML 4.0; HTML 5.0; HTML 5.0; HTML 5.0	HTMLsymbol	ISOtech	up tack (orthogonal to perpendicular, bottom tack, up tee) (Note: &perp;: Unicode only defines U+22A5 as the "up tack", and the Unicode symbol for "perpendicular" is U+27C2: the two symbols look similar, but are separate in Unicode. However, HTML uses U+22A5 as its "perpendicular" symbol: this is a discrepancy between HTML and Unicode. As well, the U+22A4 character (the "down tack" symbol) rendered in a browser such as Firefox 3.6 can match the font of either "up tack" or "perpendicular", but not both, depending on whether a fixed-width or a proportional font is used. When viewed in Firefox 3.6, the symbols rendered in the order U+22A5, U+22A4, U+27C2 in a proportional font: "⊥ ⊤ ⟂" and a fixed width one: ⊥ ⊤ ⟂, shows that the "down tack" has a similar look to U+22A5 (HTML's "perpendicular") in the first case but matches U+27C2 in the second. This exemplifies the difficulties of the semiotics involved in interpreting glyphs, symbols and characters generally.)
&models;	⊧	U+22A7	HTML 5.0		ISOamsr	models
&vDash; &DoubleRightTee;	⊨	U+22A8	HTML 5.0		ISOamsr	true (double right tee)
&Vdash;	⊩	U+22A9	HTML 5.0		ISOamsr	forces
&Vvdash;	⊪	U+22AA	HTML 5.0		ISOamsr	triple vertical bar right turnstile
&VDash;	⊫	U+22AB	HTML 5.0		ISOamsr	double vertical bar double right turnstile
&nvdash;	⊬	U+22AC	HTML 5.0		ISOamsn	does not prove
&nvDash;	⊭	U+22AD	HTML 5.0		ISOamsn	not true
&nVdash;	⊮	U+22AE	HTML 5.0		ISOamsn	does not force
&nVDash;	⊯	U+22AF	HTML 5.0		ISOamsn	negated double vertical bar double right turnstile
&prurel;	⊰	U+22B0	HTML 5.0		ISOamsr	precedes under relation
&vltri; &vartriangleleft; &LeftTriangle;	⊲	U+22B2	HTML 5.0		ISOamsr	normal subgroup of (left triangle)
&vrtri; &vartriangleright; &RightTriangle;	⊳	U+22B3	HTML 5.0		ISOamsr	contains as normal subgroup (right triangle)
&ltrie; &trianglelefteq; &LeftTriangleEqual;	⊴	U+22B4	HTML 5.0		ISOamsr	normal subgroup of or equal to (left triangle equal)
&nvltrie;	⊴⃒	U+22B4 U+20D2	HTML 5.0		ISOamsn	normal subgroup of or equal to, combining long vertical line overlay
&rtrie; &trianglerighteq; &RightTriangleEqual;	⊵	U+22B5	HTML 5.0		ISOamsr	contains as normal subgroup or equal to (right triangle equal)
&nvrtrie;	⊵⃒	U+22B5 U+20D2	HTML 5.0		ISOamsn	contains as normal subgroup or equal to, combining long vertical line overlay
&origof;	⊶	U+22B6	HTML 5.0		ISOamsa	original of
&imof;	⊷	U+22B7	HTML 5.0		ISOamsa	image of
&mumap; &multimap;	⊸	U+22B8	HTML 5.0		ISOamsa	multimap
&hercon;	⊹	U+22B9	HTML 5.0		ISOamsb	Hermitian conjugate matrix
&intcal; &intercal;	⊺	U+22BA	HTML 5.0		ISOamsb	intercalate
&veebar;	⊻	U+22BB	HTML 5.0		ISOamsr; ISOamsb	xor
&barvee;	⊽	U+22BD	HTML 5.0			nor
&angrtvb;	⊾	U+22BE	HTML 5.0		ISOamso	right angle with arc
&lrtri;	⊿	U+22BF	HTML 5.0		ISOamso	right triangle (lower right triangle)
&xwedge; &Wedge; &bigwedge;	⋀	U+22C0	HTML 5.0		ISOamsb	n-ary logical and (x wedge, big wedge)
&xvee; &Vee; &bigvee;	⋁	U+22C1	HTML 5.0		ISOamsb	n-ary logical or (x vee, big vee)
&xcap; &Intersection; &bigcap;	⋂	U+22C2	HTML 5.0		ISOamsb	n-ary intersection (x cap, big cap)
&xcup; &Union; &bigcup;	⋃	U+22C3	HTML 5.0		ISOamsb	n-ary union (x cup, big cup)
&diam; &diamond; &Diamond;	⋄	U+22C4	HTML 5.0		ISOamsb	diamond operator
&sdot;	⋅	U+22C5	HTML 4.0	HTMLsymbol	ISOamsb	dot operator (small dot) (Note: &sdot;: U+22C5 'dot operator' is not the same character as U+00B7 'middle dot'.)
&sstarf; &Star;	⋆	U+22C6	HTML 5.0		ISOamsb	star operator
&divonx; &divideontimes;	⋇	U+22C7	HTML 5.0		ISOamsb	division times
&bowtie;	⋈	U+22C8	HTML 5.0		ISOamsr	bowtie
&ltimes;	⋉	U+22C9	HTML 5.0		ISOamsb	left normal factor semidirect product (left times)
&rtimes;	⋊	U+22CA	HTML 5.0		ISOamsb	right normal factor semidirect product (right times)
&lthree; &leftthreetimes;	⋋	U+22CB	HTML 5.0		ISOamsb	left semidirect product (left three times)
&rthree; &rightthreetimes;	⋌	U+22CC	HTML 5.0		ISOamsb	right semidirect product (right three times)
&bsime; &backsimeq;	⋍	U+22CD	HTML 5.0		ISOamsr	reversed tilde equals (back similar or equal to)
&cuvee; &curlyvee;	⋎	U+22CE	HTML 5.0		ISOamsb	curly logical or (curly vee)
&cuwed; &curlywedge;	⋏	U+22CF	HTML 5.0		ISOamsb	curly logical and (curly wedge)
&Sub; &Subset;	⋐	U+22D0	HTML 5.0		ISOamsr	double subset
&Sup; &Supset;	⋑	U+22D1	HTML 5.0		ISOamsr	double superset
&Cap;	⋒	U+22D2	HTML 5.0		ISOamsb	double intersection (double cap)
&Cup;	⋓	U+22D3	HTML 5.0		ISOamsb	double union (double cup)
&fork; &pitchfork;	⋔	U+22D4	HTML 5.0		ISOamsr	pitchfork
&epar;	⋕	U+22D5	HTML 5.0		ISOtech	equal and parallel to
&ltdot; &lessdot;	⋖	U+22D6	HTML 5.0		ISOamsr	less-than with dot
&gtdot; &gtrdot;	⋗	U+22D7	HTML 5.0		ISOamsr	greater-than with dot
&Ll;	⋘	U+22D8	HTML 5.0		ISOamsr	very much less-than (Note: &Ll;: U+22D8 'very much less-than' is missing in the HTML 5.2 list of entities, where it was omitted.)
&nLl;	⋘̸	U+22D8 U+0338	HTML 5.0		ISOamsn	very much less-than, combining long solidus overlay
&Gg; &ggg;	⋙	U+22D9	HTML 5.0		ISOamsr	very much greater-than
&nGg;	⋙̸	U+22D9 U+0338	HTML 5.0		ISOamsn	very much greater-than, combining long solidus overlay
&leg; &LessEqualGreater; &lesseqgtr;	⋚	U+22DA	HTML 5.0		ISOamsr	less-than equal to or greater-than
&lesg;	⋚︀	U+22DA U+FE00	HTML 5.0		ISOamsr	less-than equal to or greater-than, variation selector-1
&gel; &gtreqless; &GreaterEqualLess;	⋛	U+22DB	HTML 5.0		ISOamsr	greater-than equal to or less-than
&gesl;	⋛︀	U+22DB U+FE00	HTML 5.0		ISOamsr	greater-than equal to or less-than, variation selector-1
&cuepr; &curlyeqprec;	⋞	U+22DE	HTML 5.0		ISOamsr	equal to or precedes (curly equal to or precedes)
&cuesc; &curlyeqsucc;	⋟	U+22DF	HTML 5.0		ISOamsr	equal to or succeeds (curly equal to or succeeds)
&nprcue; &NotPrecedesSlantEqual;	⋠	U+22E0	HTML 5.0		ISOamsn	does not precede or equal (not precedes curly equal, not precedes slant equal)
&nsccue; &NotSucceedsSlantEqual;	⋡	U+22E1	HTML 5.0		ISOamsn	does not succeed or equal (not succeeds curly equal, not succeeds slant equal)
&nsqsube; &NotSquareSubsetEqual;	⋢	U+22E2	HTML 5.0		ISOamsn	not square image of or equal to (not square subset equal)
&nsqsupe; &NotSquareSupersetEqual;	⋣	U+22E3	HTML 5.0		ISOamsn	not square original of or equal to (not square superset equal)
&lnsim;	⋦	U+22E6	HTML 5.0		ISOamsn	less-than but not equivalent to (less-than but not similar to)
&gnsim;	⋧	U+22E7	HTML 5.0		ISOamsn	greater-than but not equivalent to (greater-than but not similar to)
&prnsim; &precnsim;	⋨	U+22E8	HTML 5.0		ISOamsn	precedes but not equivalent to (precedes but not similar to)
&scnsim; &succnsim;	⋩	U+22E9	HTML 5.0		ISOamsn	succeeds but not equivalent to (succeeds but not similar to)
&nltri; &ntriangleleft; &NotLeftTriangle;	⋪	U+22EA	HTML 5.0		ISOamsn	not normal subgroup of (not left triangle)
&nrtri; &ntriangleright; &NotRightTriangle;	⋫	U+22EB	HTML 5.0		ISOamsn	does not contain as normal subgroup (not right triangle)
&nltrie; &ntrianglelefteq; &NotLeftTriangleEqual;	⋬	U+22EC	HTML 5.0		ISOamsn	not normal subgroup of or equal to (not left triangle equal)
&nrtrie; &ntrianglerighteq; &NotRightTriangleEqual;	⋭	U+22ED	HTML 5.0		ISOamsn	does not contain as normal subgroup or equal (not right triangle equal)
&vellip;	⋮	U+22EE	HTML 5.0		ISOpub	vertical ellipsis
&ctdot;	⋯	U+22EF	HTML 5.0		ISOtech	midline horizontal ellipsis (centered triple dot)
&utdot;	⋰	U+22F0	HTML 5.0		ISOtech	up right diagonal ellipsis (upward triple dot)
&dtdot;	⋱	U+22F1	HTML 5.0		ISOtech	down right diagonal ellipsis (downward triple dot)
&disin;	⋲	U+22F2	HTML 5.0		ISOtech	element of with long horizontal stroke
&isinsv;	⋳	U+22F3	HTML 5.0		ISOtech	element of with vertical bar at end of horizontal stroke
&isins;	⋴	U+22F4	HTML 5.0		ISOtech	small element of with vertical bar at end of horizontal stroke
&isindot;	⋵	U+22F5	HTML 5.0		ISOtech	element of with dot above
&notindot;	⋵̸	U+22F5 U+0338	HTML 5.0		ISOtech	element of with dot above, combining long solidus overlay
&notinvc;	⋶	U+22F6	HTML 5.0		ISOtech	element of with overbar
&notinvb;	⋷	U+22F7	HTML 5.0		ISOtech	small element of with overbar
&isinE;	⋹	U+22F9	HTML 5.0		ISOtech	element of with two horizontal strokes
&notinE;	⋹̸	U+22F9 U+0338	HTML 5.0		ISOtech	element of with two horizontal strokes, combining long solidus overlay
&nisd;	⋺	U+22FA	HTML 5.0		ISOtech	contains with long horizontal stroke
&xnis;	⋻	U+22FB	HTML 5.0		ISOtech	contains with vertical bar at end of horizontal stroke
&nis;	⋼	U+22FC	HTML 5.0		ISOtech	small contains with vertical bar at end of horizontal stroke
&notnivc;	⋽	U+22FD	HTML 5.0		ISOtech	contains with overbar
&notnivb;	⋾	U+22FE	HTML 5.0		ISOtech	small contains with overbar
&barwed; &barwedge;	⌅	U+2305	HTML 5.0		ISOamsb	projective
&Barwed; &doublebarwedge;	⌆	U+2306	HTML 5.0		ISOamsb	perspective
&lceil; &LeftCeiling;	⌈	U+2308	HTML 4.0; HTML 5.0	HTMLsymbol	ISOamsc	left ceiling (APL upstile)
&rceil; &RightCeiling;	⌉	U+2309	HTML 4.0; HTML 5.0	HTMLsymbol	ISOamsc	right ceiling
&lfloor; &LeftFloor;	⌊	U+230A	HTML 4.0; HTML 5.0	HTMLsymbol	ISOamsc	left floor (APL downstile)
&rfloor; &RightFloor;	⌋	U+230B	HTML 4.0; HTML 5.0	HTMLsymbol	ISOamsc	right floor
&drcrop;	⌌	U+230C	HTML 5.0		ISOpub	bottom right crop (down right crop)
&dlcrop;	⌍	U+230D	HTML 5.0		ISOpub	bottom left crop (down left crop)
&urcrop;	⌎	U+230E	HTML 5.0		ISOpub	top right crop (up right crop)
&ulcrop;	⌏	U+230F	HTML 5.0		ISOpub	top left crop (up left crop)
&bnot;	⌐	U+2310	HTML 5.0		ISOtech	reversed not sign (backwards not sign)
&profline;	⌒	U+2312	HTML 5.0		ISOtech	arc
&profsurf;	⌓	U+2313	HTML 5.0		ISOtech	segment
&telrec;	⌕	U+2315	HTML 5.0		ISOpub	telephone recorder
&target;	⌖	U+2316	HTML 5.0		ISOpub	position indicator (target)
&ulcorn; &ulcorner;	⌜	U+231C	HTML 5.0		ISOamsc	top left corner (up left corner)
&urcorn; &urcorner;	⌝	U+231D	HTML 5.0		ISOamsc	top right corner (up right corner)
&dlcorn; &llcorner;	⌞	U+231E	HTML 5.0		ISOamsc	bottom left corner (down left corner)
&drcorn; &lrcorner;	⌟	U+231F	HTML 5.0		ISOamsc	bottom right corner (down right corner)
&frown; &sfrown;	⌢	U+2322	HTML 5.0		ISOamsr	frown
&smile; &ssmile;	⌣	U+2323	HTML 5.0		ISOamsr	smile
&cylcty;	⌭	U+232D	HTML 5.0		ISOtech	cylindricity
&profalar;	⌮	U+232E	HTML 5.0		ISOtech	all around-profile
&topbot;	⌶	U+2336	HTML 5.0		ISOtech	APL functional symbol I-beam (top bottom)
&ovbar;	⌽	U+233D	HTML 5.0		ISOamsb	APL functional symbol circle stile (circle vertical bar)
&solbar;	⌿	U+233F	HTML 5.0		ISOamsn	APL functional symbol slash bar (solidus bar)
&angzarr;	⍼	U+237C	HTML 5.0		ISOamsa	right angle with downwards zigzag arrow (azimuth, angzarr)
&lmoust; &lmoustache;	⎰	U+23B0	HTML 5.0		ISOamsc	upper left or lower right curly bracket section (left moustache)
&rmoust; &rmoustache;	⎱	U+23B1	HTML 5.0		ISOamsc	upper right or lower left curly bracket section (right moustache)
&tbrk; &OverBracket;	⎴	U+23B4	HTML 5.0		ISOamso	top square bracket (over bracket)
&bbrk; &UnderBracket;	⎵	U+23B5	HTML 5.0		ISOamso	bottom square bracket (under bracket)
&bbrktbrk;	⎶	U+23B6	HTML 5.0		ISOamso	bottom square bracket over top square bracket
&OverParenthesis;	⏜	U+23DC	HTML 5.0			top parenthesis (over parenthesis)
&UnderParenthesis;	⏝	U+23DD	HTML 5.0			bottom parenthesis (under parenthesis)
&OverBrace;	⏞	U+23DE	HTML 5.0			top curly bracket (over brace)
&UnderBrace;	⏟	U+23DF	HTML 5.0			bottom curly bracket (under brace)
&trpezium;	⏢	U+23E2	HTML 5.0		ISOamso	white trapezium
&elinters;	⏧	U+23E7	HTML 5.0		ISOtech	electrical intersection
&blank;	␣	U+2423	HTML 5.0		ISOpub	open box (blank)
&oS; &circledS;	Ⓢ	U+24C8	HTML 5.0		ISOamso	circled Latin capital letter S
&boxh; &HorizontalLine;	─	U+2500	HTML 5.0		ISObox	box drawings light horizontal (horizontal line)
&boxv;	│	U+2502	HTML 5.0		ISObox	box drawings light vertical
&boxdr;	┌	U+250C	HTML 5.0		ISObox	box drawings light down and right
&boxdl;	┐	U+2510	HTML 5.0		ISObox	box drawings light down and left
&boxur;	└	U+2514	HTML 5.0		ISObox	box drawings light up and right
&boxul;	┘	U+2518	HTML 5.0		ISObox	box drawings light up and left
&boxvr;	├	U+251C	HTML 5.0		ISObox	box drawings light vertical and right
&boxvl;	┤	U+2524	HTML 5.0		ISObox	box drawings light vertical and left
&boxhd;	┬	U+252C	HTML 5.0		ISObox	box drawings light down and horizontal (horizontal and down)
&boxhu;	┴	U+2534	HTML 5.0		ISObox	box drawings light up and horizontal (horizontal and up)
&boxvh;	┼	U+253C	HTML 5.0		ISObox	box drawings light vertical and horizontal
&boxH;	═	U+2550	HTML 5.0		ISObox	box drawings double horizontal
&boxV;	║	U+2551	HTML 5.0		ISObox	box drawings double vertical
&boxdR;	╒	U+2552	HTML 5.0		ISObox	box drawings down single and right double
&boxDr;	╓	U+2553	HTML 5.0		ISObox	box drawings down double and right single
&boxDR;	╔	U+2554	HTML 5.0		ISObox	box drawings double down and right
&boxdL;	╕	U+2555	HTML 5.0		ISObox	box drawings down single and left double
&boxDl;	╖	U+2556	HTML 5.0		ISObox	box drawings down double and left single
&boxDL;	╗	U+2557	HTML 5.0		ISObox	box drawings double down and left
&boxuR;	╘	U+2558	HTML 5.0		ISObox	box drawings up single and right double
&boxUr;	╙	U+2559	HTML 5.0		ISObox	box drawings up double and right single
&boxUR;	╚	U+255A	HTML 5.0		ISObox	box drawings double up and right
&boxuL;	╛	U+255B	HTML 5.0		ISObox	box drawings up single and left double
&boxUl;	╜	U+255C	HTML 5.0		ISObox	box drawings up double and left single
&boxUL;	╝	U+255D	HTML 5.0		ISObox	box drawings double up and left
&boxvR;	╞	U+255E	HTML 5.0		ISObox	box drawings vertical single and right double
&boxVr;	╟	U+255F	HTML 5.0		ISObox	box drawings vertical double and right single
&boxVR;	╠	U+2560	HTML 5.0		ISObox	box drawings double vertical and right
&boxvL;	╡	U+2561	HTML 5.0		ISObox	box drawings vertical single and left double
&boxVl;	╢	U+2562	HTML 5.0		ISObox	box drawings vertical double and left single
&boxVL;	╣	U+2563	HTML 5.0		ISObox	box drawings double vertical and left
&boxHd;	╤	U+2564	HTML 5.0		ISObox	box drawings down single and horizontal double (horizontal double and down single)
&boxhD;	╥	U+2565	HTML 5.0		ISObox	box drawings down double and horizontal single (horizontal single and down double)
&boxHD;	╦	U+2566	HTML 5.0		ISObox	box drawings double down and horizontal (horizontal and down)
&boxHu;	╧	U+2567	HTML 5.0		ISObox	box drawings up single and horizontal double (horizontal double and up single)
&boxhU;	╨	U+2568	HTML 5.0		ISObox	box drawings up double and horizontal single (horizontal single and up double)
&boxHU;	╩	U+2569	HTML 5.0		ISObox	box drawings double up and horizontal (horizontal and up)
&boxvH;	╪	U+256A	HTML 5.0		ISObox	box drawings vertical single and horizontal double
&boxVh;	╫	U+256B	HTML 5.0		ISObox	box drawings vertical double and horizontal single
&boxVH;	╬	U+256C	HTML 5.0		ISObox	box drawings double vertical and horizontal
&uhblk;	▀	U+2580	HTML 5.0		ISOpub	upper half block
&lhblk;	▄	U+2584	HTML 5.0		ISOpub	lower half block
&block;	█	U+2588	HTML 5.0		ISOpub	full block
&blk14;	░	U+2591	HTML 5.0		ISOpub	light shade (1/4 block)
&blk12;	▒	U+2592	HTML 5.0		ISOpub	medium shade (1/2 block)
&blk34;	▓	U+2593	HTML 5.0		ISOpub	dark shade (3/4 block)
&squ; &square; &Square;	□	U+25A1	HTML 5.0		ISOpub	white square
&squf; &squarf; &blacksquare; &FilledVerySmallSquare;	▪	U+25AA	HTML 5.0		ISOpub	black small square (filled very small square)
&EmptyVerySmallSquare;	▫	U+25AB	HTML 5.0			white small square (empty very small square)
&rect;	▭	U+25AD	HTML 5.0		ISOpub	white rectangle
&marker;	▮	U+25AE	HTML 5.0		ISOpub	black vertical rectangle (marker)
&fltns;	▱	U+25B1	HTML 5.0		ISOtech	white parallelogram
&xutri; &bigtriangleup;	△	U+25B3	HTML 5.0		ISOamsb	white up-pointing triangle (big up-pointing triangle)
&utrif; &blacktriangle;	▴	U+25B4	HTML 5.0		ISOpub	black up-pointing small triangle (black triangle, up-pointing triangle filled)
&utri; &triangle;	▵	U+25B5	HTML 5.0		ISOpub	white up-pointing small triangle (up-pointing triangle)
&rtrif; &blacktriangleright;	▸	U+25B8	HTML 5.0		ISOpub	black right-pointing small triangle (black right-pointing triangle, right-pointing triangle filled)
&rtri; &triangleright;	▹	U+25B9	HTML 5.0		ISOpub	white right-pointing small triangle (right-pointing triangle)
&xdtri; &bigtriangledown;	▽	U+25BD	HTML 5.0		ISOamsb	white down-pointing triangle (big down-pointing triangle)
&dtrif; &blacktriangledown;	▾	U+25BE	HTML 5.0		ISOpub	black down-pointing small triangle (black down-pointing triangle, down-pointing triangle filled)
&dtri; &triangledown;	▿	U+25BF	HTML 5.0		ISOpub	white down-pointing small triangle (down-pointing triangle)
&ltrif; &blacktriangleleft;	◂	U+25C2	HTML 5.0		ISOpub	black left-pointing small triangle (black left-pointing triangle, left-pointing triangle filled)
&ltri; &triangleleft;	◃	U+25C3	HTML 5.0		ISOpub	white left-pointing small triangle (left-pointing triangle)
&loz; &lozenge;	◊	U+25CA	HTML 4.0; HTML 5.0	HTMLsymbol	ISOpub	lozenge
&cir;	○	U+25CB	HTML 5.0		ISOpub	white circle (circle)
&tridot;	◬	U+25EC	HTML 5.0		ISOamsb	white up-pointing triangle with dot (triangle dot)
&xcirc; &bigcirc;	◯	U+25EF	HTML 5.0		ISOamsb	large circle (big circle)
&ultri;	◸	U+25F8	HTML 5.0		ISOamso	upper left triangle
&urtri;	◹	U+25F9	HTML 5.0		ISOamso	upper right triangle
&lltri;	◺	U+25FA	HTML 5.0		ISOamso	lower left triangle
&EmptySmallSquare;	◻	U+25FB	HTML 5.0			white medium square (empty small square)
&FilledSmallSquare;	◼	U+25FC	HTML 5.0			black medium square (filled small square)
&starf; &bigstar;	★	U+2605	HTML 5.0		ISOpub	black star (filled star, big star)
&star;	☆	U+2606	HTML 5.0		ISOpub	white star (star)
&phone;	☎	U+260E	HTML 5.0		ISOpub	black telephone (phone)
&female;	♀	U+2640	HTML 5.0		ISOpub	female sign
&male;	♂	U+2642	HTML 5.0		ISOpub	male sign
&spades; &spadesuit;	♠	U+2660	HTML 4.0; HTML 5.0	HTMLsymbol	ISOpub	black spade suit
&clubs; &clubsuit;	♣	U+2663	HTML 4.0; HTML 5.0	HTMLsymbol	ISOpub	black club suit (shamrock)
&hearts; &heartsuit;	♥	U+2665	HTML 4.0; HTML 5.0	HTMLsymbol	ISOpub	black heart suit (valentine)
&diams; &diamondsuit;	♦	U+2666	HTML 4.0; HTML 5.0	HTMLsymbol	ISOpub	black diamond suit
&sung;	♪	U+266A	HTML 5.0		ISOnum	eighth note (sung)
&flat;	♭	U+266D	HTML 5.0		ISOpub	music flat sign
&natur; &natural;	♮	U+266E	HTML 5.0		ISOpub	music natural sign
&sharp;	♯	U+266F	HTML 5.0		ISOpub	music sharp sign
&check; &checkmark;	✓	U+2713	HTML 5.0		ISOpub	check mark
&cross;	✗	U+2717	HTML 5.0		ISOpub	ballot x (cross)
&malt; &maltese;	✠	U+2720	HTML 5.0		ISOpub	Maltese cross
&sext;	✶	U+2736	HTML 5.0		ISOpub	six pointed black star (sextile)
&VerticalSeparator;	❘	U+2758	HTML 5.0			light vertical bar (vertical separator)
&lbbrk;	❲	U+2772	HTML 5.0		ISOtech	light left tortoise shell bracket ornament
&rbbrk;	❳	U+2773	HTML 5.0		ISOtech	light right tortoise shell bracket ornament
&bsolhsub;	⟈	U+27C8	HTML 5.0		ISOamsr	reverse solidus preceding subset
&suphsol;	⟉	U+27C9	HTML 5.0		ISOamsr	superset preceding solidus
&lobrk; &LeftDoubleBracket;	⟦	U+27E6	HTML 5.0		ISOtech	mathematical left white square bracket
&robrk; &RightDoubleBracket;	⟧	U+27E7	HTML 5.0		ISOtech	mathematical right white square bracket
&lang; &LeftAngleBracket; &langle;	⟨	U+27E8; previously U+2329	HTML 4.0; HTML 5.0; HTML 5.0	HTMLsymbol	ISOtech	mathematical left angle bracket (bra) (Note: &lang;: U+27E8 'mathematical left angle bracket' is not the same character as U+003C 'less than', U+2039 'single left-pointing angle quotation mark', or U+3008 'left angle bracket'. In HTML 5.0, lang was remapped to this code, as U+2329 'left-pointing angle bracket' has been marked deprecated in Unicode (since version 5.2) (Unicode.org – Proposal for Additional Deprecated Characters).)
&rang; &RightAngleBracket; &rangle;	⟩	U+27E9; previously U+232A	HTML 4.0; HTML 5.0; HTML 5.0	HTMLsymbol	ISOtech	mathematical right angle bracket (ket) (Note: &rang;: U+27E9 'mathematical right angle bracket' is not the same character as U+003E 'greater than', U+203A 'single right-pointing angle quotation mark', or U+3009 'right angle bracket'. In HTML 5.0, rang had been remapped to this code, as U+232A 'right-pointing angle bracket' has been marked deprecated in Unicode (since version 5.2) (Unicode.org – Proposal for Additional Deprecated Characters).)
&Lang;	⟪	U+27EA	HTML 5.0		ISOtech	mathematical left double angle bracket
&Rang;	⟫	U+27EB	HTML 5.0		ISOtech	mathematical right double angle bracket
&loang;	⟬	U+27EC	HTML 5.0		ISOtech	mathematical left white tortoise shell bracket
&roang;	⟭	U+27ED	HTML 5.0		ISOtech	mathematical right white tortoise shell bracket
&xlarr; &longleftarrow; &LongLeftArrow;	⟵	U+27F5	HTML 5.0		ISOamsa	long leftwards arrow
&xrarr; &longrightarrow; &LongRightArrow;	⟶	U+27F6	HTML 5.0		ISOamsa	long rightwards arrow
&xharr; &longleftrightarrow; &LongLeftRightArrow;	⟷	U+27F7	HTML 5.0		ISOamsa	long left right arrow (long horizontal arrow)
&xlArr; &Longleftarrow; &DoubleLongLeftArrow;	⟸	U+27F8	HTML 5.0		ISOamsa	long leftwards double arrow
&xrArr; &Longrightarrow; &DoubleLongRightArrow;	⟹	U+27F9	HTML 5.0		ISOamsa	long rightwards double arrow
&xhArr; &Longleftrightarrow; &DoubleLongLeftRightArrow;	⟺	U+27FA	HTML 5.0		ISOamsa	long left right double arrow (long horizontal double arrow)
&xmap; &longmapsto;	⟼	U+27FC	HTML 5.0		ISOamsa	long rightwards arrow from bar (long maps to)
&dzigrarr;	⟿	U+27FF	HTML 5.0		ISOamsa	long rightwards squiggle arrow (long rightwards zigzag arrow)
&nvlArr;	⤂	U+2902	HTML 5.0		ISOamsa	leftwards double arrow with vertical stroke
&nvrArr;	⤃	U+2903	HTML 5.0		ISOamsa	rightwards double arrow with vertical stroke
&nvHarr;	⤄	U+2904	HTML 5.0		ISOamsa	left right double arrow with vertical stroke
&Map;	⤅	U+2905	HTML 5.0		ISOamsa	rightwards two-headed arrow from bar (double maps to)
&lbarr;	⤌	U+290C	HTML 5.0		ISOamsa	leftwards double dash arrow
&rbarr; &bkarow;	⤍	U+290D	HTML 5.0		ISOamsa	rightwards double dash arrow
&lBarr;	⤎	U+290E	HTML 5.0		ISOamsa	leftwards triple dash arrow
&rBarr; &dbkarow;	⤏	U+290F	HTML 5.0		ISOamsa	rightwards triple dash arrow
&RBarr; &drbkarow;	⤐	U+2910	HTML 5.0		ISOamsa	rightwards two-headed triple dash arrow
&DDotrahd;	⤑	U+2911	HTML 5.0		ISOamsa	rightwards arrow with dotted stem
&UpArrowBar;	⤒	U+2912	HTML 5.0			upwards arrow to bar
&DownArrowBar;	⤓	U+2913	HTML 5.0			downwards arrow to bar
&Rarrtl;	⤖	U+2916	HTML 5.0		ISOamsa	rightwards two-headed arrow with tail
&latail;	⤙	U+2919	HTML 5.0		ISOamsa	leftwards arrow-tail
&ratail;	⤚	U+291A	HTML 5.0		ISOamsa	rightwards arrow-tail
&lAtail;	⤛	U+291B	HTML 5.0		ISOamsa	leftwards double arrow-tail
&rAtail;	⤜	U+291C	HTML 5.0		ISOamsa	rightwards double arrow-tail
&larrfs;	⤝	U+291D	HTML 5.0		ISOamsa	leftwards arrow to black diamond
&rarrfs;	⤞	U+291E	HTML 5.0		ISOamsa	rightwards arrow to black diamond
&larrbfs;	⤟	U+291F	HTML 5.0		ISOamsa	leftwards arrow from bar to black diamond
&rarrbfs;	⤠	U+2920	HTML 5.0		ISOamsa	rightwards arrow from bar to black diamond
&nwarhk;	⤣	U+2923	HTML 5.0		ISOamsa	north west arrow with hook
&nearhk;	⤤	U+2924	HTML 5.0		ISOamsa	north east arrow with hook
&searhk; &hksearow;	⤥	U+2925	HTML 5.0		ISOamsa	south east arrow with hook
&swarhk; &hkswarow;	⤦	U+2926	HTML 5.0		ISOamsa	south west arrow with hook
&nwnear;	⤧	U+2927	HTML 5.0		ISOamsa	north west arrow and north east arrow
&nesear; &toea;	⤨	U+2928	HTML 5.0		ISOamsa	north east arrow and south east arrow (to east arrow)
&seswar; &tosa;	⤩	U+2929	HTML 5.0		ISOamsa	south east arrow and south west arrow (to south arrow)
&swnwar;	⤪	U+292A	HTML 5.0		ISOamsa	south west arrow and north west arrow
&rarrc;	⤳	U+2933	HTML 5.0		ISOamsa	wave arrow pointing directly right (right arrow curved)
&nrarrc;	⤳̸	U+2933 U+0338	HTML 5.0		ISOamsa	wave arrow pointing directly right, combining long solidus overlay
&cudarrr;	⤵	U+2935	HTML 5.0		ISOamsa	arrow pointing rightwards then curving downwards (curved down arrow right)
&ldca;	⤶	U+2936	HTML 5.0		ISOamsa	arrow pointing downwards then curving leftwards (left down curved arrow)
&rdca;	⤷	U+2937	HTML 5.0		ISOamsa	arrow pointing downwards then curving rightwards (right down curved arrow)
&cudarrl;	⤸	U+2938	HTML 5.0		ISOamsa	right-side arc clockwise arrow (curved down arrow left)
&larrpl;	⤹	U+2939	HTML 5.0		ISOamsa	left-side arc anticlockwise arrow
&curarrm;	⤼	U+293C	HTML 5.0		ISOamsa	top arc clockwise arrow with minus (curved right arrow with minus)
&cularrp;	⤽	U+293D	HTML 5.0		ISOamsa	top arc anticlockwise arrow with plus (curved left arrow with plus)
&rarrpl;	⥅	U+2945	HTML 5.0		ISOamsa	rightwards arrow with plus below
&harrcir;	⥈	U+2948	HTML 5.0		ISOamsa	left right arrow through small circle
&Uarrocir;	⥉	U+2949	HTML 5.0		ISOamsa	upwards two-headed arrow from small circle
&lurdshar;	⥊	U+294A	HTML 5.0		ISOamsa	left barb up right barb down harpoon (left up right down short arrow)
&ldrushar;	⥋	U+294B	HTML 5.0		ISOamsa	left barb down right barb up harpoon (left down right up short arrow)
&LeftRightVector;	⥎	U+294E	HTML 5.0			left barb up right barb up harpoon (left right vector)
&RightUpDownVector;	⥏	U+294F	HTML 5.0			up barb right down barb right harpoon (right up down vector)
&DownLeftRightVector;	⥐	U+2950	HTML 5.0			left barb down right barb down harpoon (down left right vector)
&LeftUpDownVector;	⥑	U+2951	HTML 5.0			up barb left down barb left harpoon (left up down vector)
&LeftVectorBar;	⥒	U+2952	HTML 5.0			leftwards harpoon with barb up to bar (left vector bar)
&RightVectorBar;	⥓	U+2953	HTML 5.0			rightwards harpoon with barb up to bar (right vector bar)
&RightUpVectorBar;	⥔	U+2954	HTML 5.0			upwards harpoon with barb right to bar (right up vector bar)
&RightDownVectorBar;	⥕	U+2955	HTML 5.0			downwards harpoon with barb right to bar (right down vector bar)
&DownLeftVectorBar;	⥖	U+2956	HTML 5.0			leftwards harpoon with barb down to bar (down left vector bar)
&DownRightVectorBar;	⥗	U+2957	HTML 5.0			rightwards harpoon with barb down to bar (down right vector bar)
&LeftUpVectorBar;	⥘	U+2958	HTML 5.0			upwards harpoon with barb left to bar (left up vector bar)
&LeftDownVectorBar;	⥙	U+2959	HTML 5.0			downwards harpoon with barb left to bar (left down vector bar)
&LeftTeeVector;	⥚	U+295A	HTML 5.0			leftwards harpoon with barb up from bar (left tee vector)
&RightTeeVector;	⥛	U+295B	HTML 5.0			rightwards harpoon with barb up from bar (right tee vector)
&RightUpTeeVector;	⥜	U+295C	HTML 5.0			upwards harpoon with barb right from bar (right up tee vector)
&RightDownTeeVector;	⥝	U+295D	HTML 5.0			downwards harpoon with barb right from bar (right down tee vector)
&DownLeftTeeVector;	⥞	U+295E	HTML 5.0			leftwards harpoon with barb down from bar (down left tee vector)
&DownRightTeeVector;	⥟	U+295F	HTML 5.0			rightwards harpoon with barb down from bar (down right tee vector)
&LeftUpTeeVector;	⥠	U+2960	HTML 5.0			upwards harpoon with barb left from bar (left up tee vector)
&LeftDownTeeVector;	⥡	U+2961	HTML 5.0			downwards harpoon with barb left from bar (left down tee vector)
&lHar;	⥢	U+2962	HTML 5.0		ISOamsa	leftwards harpoon with barb up above leftwards harpoon with barb down
&uHar;	⥣	U+2963	HTML 5.0		ISOamsa	upwards harpoon with barb left beside upwards harpoon with barb right
&rHar;	⥤	U+2964	HTML 5.0		ISOamsa	rightwards harpoon with barb up above rightwards harpoon with barb down
&dHar;	⥥	U+2965	HTML 5.0		ISOamsa	downwards harpoon with barb left beside downwards harpoon with barb right
&luruhar;	⥦	U+2966	HTML 5.0		ISOamsa	leftwards harpoon with barb up above rightwards harpoon with barb up
&ldrdhar;	⥧	U+2967	HTML 5.0		ISOamsa	leftwards harpoon with barb down above rightwards harpoon with barb down
&ruluhar;	⥨	U+2968	HTML 5.0		ISOamsa	rightwards harpoon with barb up above leftwards harpoon with barb up
&rdldhar;	⥩	U+2969	HTML 5.0		ISOamsa	rightwards harpoon with barb down above leftwards harpoon with barb down
&lharul;	⥪	U+296A	HTML 5.0		ISOamsa	leftwards harpoon with barb up above long dash
&llhard;	⥫	U+296B	HTML 5.0		ISOamsa	leftwards harpoon with barb down below long dash
&rharul;	⥬	U+296C	HTML 5.0		ISOamsa	rightwards harpoon with barb up above long dash
&lrhard;	⥭	U+296D	HTML 5.0		ISOamsa	rightwards harpoon with barb down below long dash
&udhar; &UpEquilibrium;	⥮	U+296E	HTML 5.0		ISOamsa	upwards harpoon with barb left beside downwards harpoon with barb right (up equilibrium)
&duhar; &ReverseUpEquilibrium;	⥯	U+296F	HTML 5.0		ISOamsa	downwards harpoon with barb left beside upwards harpoon with barb right (reverse up equilibrium)
&RoundImplies;	⥰	U+2970	HTML 5.0			right double arrow with rounded head (round implies)
&erarr;	⥱	U+2971	HTML 5.0		ISOamsa	equals sign above rightwards arrow
&simrarr;	⥲	U+2972	HTML 5.0		ISOamsa	tilde operator above rightwards arrow (similar to above rightwards arrow)
&larrsim;	⥳	U+2973	HTML 5.0		ISOamsa	leftwards arrow above tilde operator (leftwards arrow above similar to)
&rarrsim;	⥴	U+2974	HTML 5.0		ISOamsa	rightwards arrow above tilde operator (rightwards arrow above similar to)
&rarrap;	⥵	U+2975	HTML 5.0		ISOamsa	rightwards arrow above almost equal to (rightwards arrow above approximately equal to)
&ltlarr;	⥶	U+2976	HTML 5.0		ISOamsr	less-than above leftwards arrow
&gtrarr;	⥸	U+2978	HTML 5.0		ISOamsr	greater-than above rightwards arrow
&subrarr;	⥹	U+2979	HTML 5.0		ISOamsr	subset above rightwards arrow
&suplarr;	⥻	U+297B	HTML 5.0		ISOamsr	superset above leftwards arrow
&lfisht;	⥼	U+297C	HTML 5.0		ISOamsa	left fish tail
&rfisht;	⥽	U+297D	HTML 5.0		ISOamsa	right fish tail
&ufisht;	⥾	U+297E	HTML 5.0		ISOamsa	up fish tail
&dfisht;	⥿	U+297F	HTML 5.0		ISOamsa	down fish tail
&lopar;	⦅	U+2985	HTML 5.0		ISOtech	left white parenthesis
&ropar;	⦆	U+2986	HTML 5.0		ISOtech	right white parenthesis
&lbrke;	⦋	U+298B	HTML 5.0		ISOamsc	left square bracket with underbar
&rbrke;	⦌	U+298C	HTML 5.0		ISOamsc	right square bracket with underbar
&lbrkslu;	⦍	U+298D	HTML 5.0		ISOamsc	left square bracket with tick in top corner
&rbrksld;	⦎	U+298E	HTML 5.0		ISOamsc	right square bracket with tick in bottom corner
&lbrksld;	⦏	U+298F	HTML 5.0		ISOamsc	left square bracket with tick in bottom corner
&rbrkslu;	⦐	U+2990	HTML 5.0		ISOamsc	right square bracket with tick in top corner
&langd;	⦑	U+2991	HTML 5.0		ISOamsc	left angle bracket with dot
&rangd;	⦒	U+2992	HTML 5.0		ISOamsc	right angle bracket with dot
&lparlt;	⦓	U+2993	HTML 5.0		ISOamsc	left arc less-than bracket (left parenthesis less-than)
&rpargt;	⦔	U+2994	HTML 5.0		ISOamsc	right arc greater-than bracket (right parenthesis greater-than)
&gtlPar;	⦕	U+2995	HTML 5.0		ISOamsc	double left arc greater-than bracket (double left parenthesis greater-than)
&ltrPar;	⦖	U+2996	HTML 5.0		ISOamsc	double right arc less-than bracket (double right parenthesis less-than)
&vzigzag;	⦚	U+299A	HTML 5.0		ISOamso	vertical zigzag line
&vangrt;	⦜	U+299C	HTML 5.0		ISOtech	right angle variant with square
&angrtvbd;	⦝	U+299D	HTML 5.0		ISOamso	measured right angle with dot
&ange;	⦤	U+29A4	HTML 5.0		ISOamso	angle with underbar
&range;	⦥	U+29A5	HTML 5.0		ISOamso	reversed angle with underbar
&dwangle;	⦦	U+29A6	HTML 5.0		ISOtech	oblique angle opening up
&uwangle;	⦧	U+29A7	HTML 5.0		ISOtech	oblique angle opening down
&angmsdaa;	⦨	U+29A8	HTML 5.0		ISOamso	measured angle with open arm ending in arrow pointing up and right
&angmsdab;	⦩	U+29A9	HTML 5.0		ISOamso	measured angle with open arm ending in arrow pointing up and left
&angmsdac;	⦪	U+29AA	HTML 5.0		ISOamso	measured angle with open arm ending in arrow pointing down and right
&angmsdad;	⦫	U+29AB	HTML 5.0		ISOamso	measured angle with open arm ending in arrow pointing down and left
&angmsdae;	⦬	U+29AC	HTML 5.0		ISOamso	measured angle with open arm ending in arrow pointing right and up
&angmsdaf;	⦭	U+29AD	HTML 5.0		ISOamso	measured angle with open arm ending in arrow pointing left and up
&angmsdag;	⦮	U+29AE	HTML 5.0		ISOamso	measured angle with open arm ending in arrow pointing right and down
&angmsdah;	⦯	U+29AF	HTML 5.0		ISOamso	measured angle with open arm ending in arrow pointing left and down
&bemptyv;	⦰	U+29B0	HTML 5.0		ISOamso	reversed empty set (backwards empty set)
&demptyv;	⦱	U+29B1	HTML 5.0		ISOamso	empty set with overbar (dash over empty set)
&cemptyv;	⦲	U+29B2	HTML 5.0		ISOamso	empty set with small circle above
&raemptyv;	⦳	U+29B3	HTML 5.0		ISOamso	empty set with right arrow above
&laemptyv;	⦴	U+29B4	HTML 5.0		ISOamso	empty set with left arrow above
&ohbar;	⦵	U+29B5	HTML 5.0		ISOamsb	circle with horizontal bar
&omid;	⦶	U+29B6	HTML 5.0		ISOamsb	circled vertical bar (circled middle line)
&opar;	⦷	U+29B7	HTML 5.0		ISOamsb	circled parallel
&operp;	⦹	U+29B9	HTML 5.0		ISOamsb	circled perpendicular
&olcross;	⦻	U+29BB	HTML 5.0		ISOtech	circle with superimposed x (circled large cross)
&odsold;	⦼	U+29BC	HTML 5.0		ISOamsb	circled anticlockwise-rotated division sign
&olcir;	⦾	U+29BE	HTML 5.0		ISOamsb	circled white bullet (circled light circle)
&ofcir;	⦿	U+29BF	HTML 5.0		ISOamsb	circled bullet (circled full circle)
&olt;	⧀	U+29C0	HTML 5.0		ISOamsb	circled less-than
&ogt;	⧁	U+29C1	HTML 5.0		ISOamsb	circled greater-than
&cirscir;	⧂	U+29C2	HTML 5.0		ISOamso	circle with small circle to the right
&cirE;	⧃	U+29C3	HTML 5.0		ISOamso	circle with two horizontal strokes to the right
&solb;	⧄	U+29C4	HTML 5.0		ISOamsb	squared rising diagonal slash (boxed solidus)
&bsolb;	⧅	U+29C5	HTML 5.0		ISOamsb	squared falling diagonal slash (backward boxed solidus)
&boxbox;	⧉	U+29C9	HTML 5.0		ISOamso	two joined squares (two joined boxes)
&trisb;	⧍	U+29CD	HTML 5.0			triangle with serifs at bottom
&rtriltri;	⧎	U+29CE	HTML 5.0		ISOamsr	right triangle above left triangle
&LeftTriangleBar;	⧏	U+29CF	HTML 5.0			left triangle beside vertical bar
&NotLeftTriangleBar;	⧏̸	U+29CF U+0338	HTML 5.0			left triangle beside vertical bar, combining long solidus overlay
&RightTriangleBar;	⧐	U+29D0	HTML 5.0			vertical bar beside right triangle
&NotRightTriangleBar;	⧐̸	U+29D0 U+0338	HTML 5.0			vertical bar beside right triangle, combining long solidus overlay
&iinfin;	⧜	U+29DC	HTML 5.0		ISOtech	incomplete infinity
&infintie;	⧝	U+29DD	HTML 5.0		ISOtech	tie over infinity
&nvinfin;	⧞	U+29DE	HTML 5.0		ISOtech	infinity negated with vertical bar
&eparsl;	⧣	U+29E3	HTML 5.0		ISOtech	equals sign and slanted parallel
&smeparsl;	⧤	U+29E4	HTML 5.0		ISOtech	equals sign and slanted parallel with tilde above (similar to over equals sign and slanted parallel)
&eqvparsl;	⧥	U+29E5	HTML 5.0		ISOtech	identical to and slanted parallel ('equivalent to' and slanted parallel)
&lozf; &blacklozenge;	⧫	U+29EB	HTML 5.0		ISOpub	black lozenge (lozenge filled)
&RuleDelayed;	⧴	U+29F4	HTML 5.0			rule-delayed
&dsol;	⧶	U+29F6	HTML 5.0		ISOtech	solidus with overbar (dash over solidus)
&xodot; &bigodot;	⨀	U+2A00	HTML 5.0		ISOamsb	n-ary circled dot operator
&xoplus; &bigoplus;	⨁	U+2A01	HTML 5.0		ISOamsb	n-ary circled plus operator
&xotime; &bigotimes;	⨂	U+2A02	HTML 5.0		ISOamsb	n-ary circled times operator
&xuplus; &biguplus;	⨄	U+2A04	HTML 5.0		ISOamsb	n-ary union operator with plus (big u plus)
&xsqcup; &bigsqcup;	⨆	U+2A06	HTML 5.0		ISOamsb	n-ary square union operator (big square cup)
&qint; &iiiint;	⨌	U+2A0C	HTML 5.0		ISOtech	quadruple integral operator
&fpartint;	⨍	U+2A0D	HTML 5.0		ISOtech	finite part integral
&cirfnint;	⨐	U+2A10	HTML 5.0		ISOtech	circulation function
&awint;	⨑	U+2A11	HTML 5.0		ISOtech	anticlockwise integration
&rppolint;	⨒	U+2A12	HTML 5.0		ISOtech	line integration with rectangular path around pole
&scpolint;	⨓	U+2A13	HTML 5.0		ISOtech	line integration with semicircular path around pole
&npolint;	⨔	U+2A14	HTML 5.0		ISOtech	line integration not including the pole
&pointint;	⨕	U+2A15	HTML 5.0		ISOtech	integral around a point operator
&quatint;	⨖	U+2A16	HTML 5.0		ISOtech	quaternion integral operator
&intlarhk;	⨗	U+2A17	HTML 5.0		ISOtech	integral with leftwards arrow with hook
&pluscir;	⨢	U+2A22	HTML 5.0		ISOamsb	plus sign with small circle above
&plusacir;	⨣	U+2A23	HTML 5.0		ISOamsb	plus sign with circumflex accent above
&simplus;	⨤	U+2A24	HTML 5.0		ISOamsb	plus sign with tilde above (plus sign with similar to above)
&plusdu;	⨥	U+2A25	HTML 5.0		ISOamsb	plus sign with dot below (plus dot under)
&plussim;	⨦	U+2A26	HTML 5.0		ISOamsb	plus sign with tilde below (plus sign with similar to below)
&plustwo;	⨧	U+2A27	HTML 5.0		ISOamsb	plus sign with subscript two
&mcomma;	⨩	U+2A29	HTML 5.0		ISOamsr	minus sign with comma above
&minusdu;	⨪	U+2A2A	HTML 5.0		ISOamsb	minus sign with dot below (minus dot under)
&loplus;	⨭	U+2A2D	HTML 5.0		ISOamsb	plus sign in left half circle
&roplus;	⨮	U+2A2E	HTML 5.0		ISOamsb	plus sign in right half circle
&Cross;	⨯	U+2A2F	HTML 5.0			vector or cross product
&timesd;	⨰	U+2A30	HTML 5.0		ISOamsb	multiplication sign with dot above (times dot)
&timesbar;	⨱	U+2A31	HTML 5.0		ISOamsb	multiplication sign with underbar
&smashp;	⨳	U+2A33	HTML 5.0		ISOamsb	smash product
&lotimes;	⨴	U+2A34	HTML 5.0		ISOamsb	multiplication sign in left half circle
&rotimes;	⨵	U+2A35	HTML 5.0		ISOamsb	multiplication sign in right half circle
&otimesas;	⨶	U+2A36	HTML 5.0		ISOamsb	circled multiplication sign with circumflex accent
&Otimes;	⨷	U+2A37	HTML 5.0		ISOamsb	multiplication sign in double circle
&odiv;	⨸	U+2A38	HTML 5.0		ISOamsb	circled division sign
&triplus;	⨹	U+2A39	HTML 5.0		ISOamsb	plus sign in triangle
&triminus;	⨺	U+2A3A	HTML 5.0		ISOamsb	minus sign in triangle
&tritime;	⨻	U+2A3B	HTML 5.0		ISOamsb	multiplication sign in triangle
&iprod; &intprod;	⨼	U+2A3C	HTML 5.0		ISOamsb	interior product
&amalg;	⨿	U+2A3F	HTML 5.0		ISOamsb	amalgamation or coproduct
&capdot;	⩀	U+2A40	HTML 5.0		ISOamsb	intersection with dot (cap dot)
&ncup;	⩂	U+2A42	HTML 5.0		ISOamsb	union with overbar
&ncap;	⩃	U+2A43	HTML 5.0		ISOamsb	intersection with overbar
&capand;	⩄	U+2A44	HTML 5.0		ISOamsb	intersection with logical and (cap and)
&cupor;	⩅	U+2A45	HTML 5.0		ISOamsb	union with logical or (cup or)
&cupcap;	⩆	U+2A46	HTML 5.0		ISOamsb	union above intersection (cup cap)
&capcup;	⩇	U+2A47	HTML 5.0		ISOamsb	intersection above union (cap cup)
&cupbrcap;	⩈	U+2A48	HTML 5.0		ISOamsb	union above bar above intersection (cup bar cap)
&capbrcup;	⩉	U+2A49	HTML 5.0		ISOamsb	intersection above bar above union (cap bar cup)
&cupcup;	⩊	U+2A4A	HTML 5.0		ISOamsb	union beside and joined with union (cup cup)
&capcap;	⩋	U+2A4B	HTML 5.0		ISOamsb	intersection beside and joined with intersection (cap cap)
&ccups;	⩌	U+2A4C	HTML 5.0			closed union with serifs
&ccaps;	⩍	U+2A4D	HTML 5.0			closed intersection with serifs
&ccupssm;	⩐	U+2A50	HTML 5.0			closed union with serifs and smash product
&And;	⩓	U+2A53	HTML 5.0		ISOtech	double logical and
&Or;	⩔	U+2A54	HTML 5.0		ISOtech	double logical or
&andand;	⩕	U+2A55	HTML 5.0		ISOtech	two intersecting logical and
&oror;	⩖	U+2A56	HTML 5.0		ISOtech	two intersecting logical or
&orslope;	⩗	U+2A57	HTML 5.0		ISOtech	sloping large or
&andslope;	⩘	U+2A58	HTML 5.0		ISOtech	sloping large and
&andv;	⩚	U+2A5A	HTML 5.0		ISOtech	logical and with middle stem
&orv;	⩛	U+2A5B	HTML 5.0		ISOtech	logical or with middle stem
&andd;	⩜	U+2A5C	HTML 5.0		ISOtech	logical and with horizontal dash
&ord;	⩝	U+2A5D	HTML 5.0		ISOtech	logical or with horizontal dash
&wedbar;	⩟	U+2A5F	HTML 5.0			logical and with underbar
&sdote;	⩦	U+2A66	HTML 5.0		ISOamsr	equals sign with dot below
&simdot;	⩪	U+2A6A	HTML 5.0		ISOtech	tilde operator with dot above (similar with dot)
&congdot;	⩭	U+2A6D	HTML 5.0		ISOamsr	congruent with dot above
&ncongdot;	⩭̸	U+2A6D U+0338	HTML 5.0		ISOamsn	congruent with dot above, combining long solidus overlay
&easter;	⩮	U+2A6E	HTML 5.0		ISOamsr	equals with asterisk
&apacir;	⩯	U+2A6F	HTML 5.0		ISOtech	almost equal to with circumflex accent
&apE;	⩰	U+2A70	HTML 5.0		ISOamsr	approximately equal or equal to
&napE;	⩰̸	U+2A70 U+0338	HTML 5.0		ISOamsn	approximately equal or equal to, combining long solidus overlay
&eplus;	⩱	U+2A71	HTML 5.0		ISOamsb	equals sign above plus sign
&pluse;	⩲	U+2A72	HTML 5.0		ISOamsb	plus sign above equals sign
&Esim;	⩳	U+2A73	HTML 5.0		ISOamsr	equals sign above tilde operator
&Colone;	⩴	U+2A74	HTML 5.0		ISOamsr	double colon equal
&Equal;	⩵	U+2A75	HTML 5.0			two consecutive equals signs
&eDDot; &ddotseq;	⩷	U+2A77	HTML 5.0		ISOamsr	equals sign with two dots above and two dots below
&equivDD;	⩸	U+2A78	HTML 5.0		ISOamsr	equivalent with four dots above
&ltcir;	⩹	U+2A79	HTML 5.0		ISOamsr	less-than with circle inside
&gtcir;	⩺	U+2A7A	HTML 5.0		ISOamsr	greater-than with circle inside
&ltquest;	⩻	U+2A7B	HTML 5.0		ISOamsr	less-than with question mark above
&gtquest;	⩼	U+2A7C	HTML 5.0		ISOamsr	greater-than with question mark above
&les; &LessSlantEqual; &leqslant;	⩽	U+2A7D	HTML 5.0		ISOamsr	less-than or slanted equal to
&nles; &nleqslant; &NotLessSlantEqual;	⩽̸	U+2A7D U+0338	HTML 5.0		ISOamsn	less-than or slanted equal to, combining long solidus overlay
&ges; &GreaterSlantEqual; &geqslant;	⩾	U+2A7E	HTML 5.0		ISOamsr	greater-than or slanted equal to
&nges; &ngeqslant; &NotGreaterSlantEqual;	⩾̸	U+2A7E U+0338	HTML 5.0		ISOamsn	greater-than or slanted equal to, combining long solidus overlay
&lesdot;	⩿	U+2A7F	HTML 5.0		ISOamsr	less-than or slanted equal to with dot inside
&gesdot;	⪀	U+2A80	HTML 5.0		ISOamsr	greater-than or slanted equal to with dot inside
&lesdoto;	⪁	U+2A81	HTML 5.0		ISOamsr	less-than or slanted equal to with dot above
&gesdoto;	⪂	U+2A82	HTML 5.0		ISOamsr	greater-than or slanted equal to with dot above
&lesdotor;	⪃	U+2A83	HTML 5.0		ISOamsr	less-than or slanted equal to with dot above right
&gesdotol;	⪄	U+2A84	HTML 5.0		ISOamsr	greater-than or slanted equal to with dot above left
&lap; &lessapprox;	⪅	U+2A85	HTML 5.0		ISOamsr	less-than or approximate
&gap; &gtrapprox;	⪆	U+2A86	HTML 5.0		ISOamsr	greater-than or approximate
&lne; &lneq;	⪇	U+2A87	HTML 5.0		ISOamsn	less-than and single-line not equal to
&gne; &gneq;	⪈	U+2A88	HTML 5.0		ISOamsn	greater-than and single-line not equal to
&lnap; &lnapprox;	⪉	U+2A89	HTML 5.0		ISOamsn	less-than and not approximate
&gnap; &gnapprox;	⪊	U+2A8A	HTML 5.0		ISOamsn	greater-than and not approximate
&lEg; &lesseqqgtr;	⪋	U+2A8B	HTML 5.0		ISOamsr	less-than above double-line equal above greater-than
&gEl; &gtreqqless;	⪌	U+2A8C	HTML 5.0		ISOamsr	greater-than above double-line equal above less-than
&lsime;	⪍	U+2A8D	HTML 5.0		ISOamsr	less-than above similar or equal
&gsime;	⪎	U+2A8E	HTML 5.0		ISOamsr	greater-than above similar or equal
&lsimg;	⪏	U+2A8F	HTML 5.0		ISOamsr	less-than above similar above greater-than
&gsiml;	⪐	U+2A90	HTML 5.0		ISOamsr	greater-than above similar above less-than
&lgE;	⪑	U+2A91	HTML 5.0		ISOamsr	less-than above greater-than above double-line equal
&glE;	⪒	U+2A92	HTML 5.0		ISOamsr	greater-than above less-than above double-line equal
&lesges;	⪓	U+2A93	HTML 5.0		ISOamsr	less-than above slanted equal above greater-than above slanted equal
&gesles;	⪔	U+2A94	HTML 5.0		ISOamsr	greater-than above slanted equal above less-than above slanted equal
&els; &eqslantless;	⪕	U+2A95	HTML 5.0		ISOamsr	slanted equal to or less-than
&egs; &eqslantgtr;	⪖	U+2A96	HTML 5.0		ISOamsr	slanted equal to or greater-than
&elsdot;	⪗	U+2A97	HTML 5.0		ISOamsr	slanted equal to or less-than with dot inside
&egsdot;	⪘	U+2A98	HTML 5.0		ISOamsr	slanted equal to or greater-than with dot inside
&el;	⪙	U+2A99	HTML 5.0		ISOamsr	double-line equal to or less-than
&eg;	⪚	U+2A9A	HTML 5.0		ISOamsr	double-line equal to or greater-than
&siml;	⪝	U+2A9D	HTML 5.0		ISOamsr	similar or less-than
&simg;	⪞	U+2A9E	HTML 5.0		ISOamsr	similar or greater-than
&simlE;	⪟	U+2A9F	HTML 5.0		ISOamsr	similar above less-than above equals sign
&simgE;	⪠	U+2AA0	HTML 5.0		ISOamsr	similar above greater-than above equals sign
&LessLess;	⪡	U+2AA1	HTML 5.0			double nested less-than
&NotNestedLessLess;	⪡̸	U+2AA1 U+0338	HTML 5.0			double nested less-than, combining long solidus overlay
&GreaterGreater;	⪢	U+2AA2	HTML 5.0			double nested greater-than
&NotNestedGreaterGreater;	⪢̸	U+2AA2 U+0338	HTML 5.0			double nested greater-than, combining long solidus overlay
&glj;	⪤	U+2AA4	HTML 5.0		ISOamsr	greater-than overlapping less-than
&gla;	⪥	U+2AA5	HTML 5.0		ISOamsr	greater-than beside less-than
&ltcc;	⪦	U+2AA6	HTML 5.0		ISOamsr	less-than closed by curve
&gtcc;	⪧	U+2AA7	HTML 5.0		ISOamsr	greater-than closed by curve
&lescc;	⪨	U+2AA8	HTML 5.0		ISOamsr	less-than closed by curve above slanted equal
&gescc;	⪩	U+2AA9	HTML 5.0		ISOamsr	greater-than closed by curve above slanted equal
&smt;	⪪	U+2AAA	HTML 5.0		ISOamsr	smaller than
&lat;	⪫	U+2AAB	HTML 5.0		ISOamsr	larger than
&smte;	⪬	U+2AAC	HTML 5.0		ISOamsr	smaller than or equal to
&smtes;	⪬︀	U+2AAC U+FE00	HTML 5.0		ISOamsr	smaller than or equal to, variation selector-1
&late;	⪭	U+2AAD	HTML 5.0		ISOamsr	larger than or equal to
&lates;	⪭︀	U+2AAD U+FE00	HTML 5.0		ISOamsr	larger than or equal to, variation selector-1
&bumpE;	⪮	U+2AAE	HTML 5.0		ISOamsr	equals sign with bumpy above
&pre; &preceq; &PrecedesEqual;	⪯	U+2AAF	HTML 5.0		ISOamsr	precedes above single-line equals sign
&npre; &NotPrecedesEqual; &npreceq;	⪯̸	U+2AAF U+0338	HTML 5.0		ISOamsn	precedes above single-line equals sign, combining long solidus overlay
&sce; &succeq; &SucceedsEqual;	⪰	U+2AB0	HTML 5.0		ISOamsr	succeeds above single-line equals sign
&nsce; &NotSucceedsEqual; &nsucceq;	⪰̸	U+2AB0 U+0338	HTML 5.0		ISOamsn	succeeds above single-line equals sign, combining long solidus overlay
&prE;	⪳	U+2AB3	HTML 5.0		ISOamsr	precedes above equals sign
&scE;	⪴	U+2AB4	HTML 5.0		ISOamsr	succeeds above equals sign
&prnE; &precneqq;	⪵	U+2AB5	HTML 5.0		ISOamsn	precedes above not equal to
&scnE; &succneqq;	⪶	U+2AB6	HTML 5.0		ISOamsn	succeeds above not equal to
&prap; &precapprox;	⪷	U+2AB7	HTML 5.0		ISOamsr	precedes above almost equal to
&scap; &succapprox;	⪸	U+2AB8	HTML 5.0		ISOamsr	succeeds above almost equal to
&prnap; &precnapprox;	⪹	U+2AB9	HTML 5.0		ISOamsn	precedes above not almost equal to
&scnap; &succnapprox;	⪺	U+2ABA	HTML 5.0		ISOamsn	succeeds above not almost equal to
&Pr;	⪻	U+2ABB	HTML 5.0		ISOamsr	double precedes
&Sc;	⪼	U+2ABC	HTML 5.0		ISOamsr	double succeeds
&subdot;	⪽	U+2ABD	HTML 5.0		ISOamsb	subset with dot
&supdot;	⪾	U+2ABE	HTML 5.0		ISOamsb	superset with dot
&subplus;	⪿	U+2ABF	HTML 5.0		ISOamsr	subset with plus sign below
&supplus;	⫀	U+2AC0	HTML 5.0		ISOamsr	superset with plus sign below
&submult;	⫁	U+2AC1	HTML 5.0		ISOamsr	subset with multiplication sign below
&supmult;	⫂	U+2AC2	HTML 5.0		ISOamsr	superset with multiplication sign below
&subedot;	⫃	U+2AC3	HTML 5.0		ISOamsr	subset of or equal to with dot above
&supedot;	⫄	U+2AC4	HTML 5.0		ISOamsr	superset of or equal to with dot above
&subE; &subseteqq;	⫅	U+2AC5	HTML 5.0		ISOamsr	subset of above equals sign
&nsubE; &nsubseteqq;	⫅̸	U+2AC5 U+0338	HTML 5.0		ISOamsn	subset of above equals sign, combining long solidus overlay
&supE; &supseteqq;	⫆	U+2AC6	HTML 5.0		ISOamsr	superset of above equals sign
&nsupE; &nsupseteqq;	⫆̸	U+2AC6 U+0338	HTML 5.0		ISOamsn	superset of above equals sign, combining long solidus overlay
&subsim;	⫇	U+2AC7	HTML 5.0		ISOamsr	subset of above tilde operator
&supsim;	⫈	U+2AC8	HTML 5.0		ISOamsr	superset of above tilde operator
&subnE; &subsetneqq;	⫋	U+2ACB	HTML 5.0		ISOamsn	subset of above not equal to
&vsubnE; &varsubsetneqq;	⫋︀	U+2ACB U+FE00	HTML 5.0		ISOamsn	subset of above not equal to, variation selector-1
&supnE; &supsetneqq;	⫌	U+2ACC	HTML 5.0		ISOamsn	superset of above not equal to
&vsupnE; &varsupsetneqq;	⫌︀	U+2ACC U+FE00	HTML 5.0		ISOamsn	superset of above not equal to, variation selector-1
&csub;	⫏	U+2ACF	HTML 5.0		ISOamsr	closed subset
&csup;	⫐	U+2AD0	HTML 5.0		ISOamsr	closed superset
&csube;	⫑	U+2AD1	HTML 5.0		ISOamsr	closed subset or equal to
&csupe;	⫒	U+2AD2	HTML 5.0		ISOamsr	closed superset or equal to
&subsup;	⫓	U+2AD3	HTML 5.0		ISOamsr	subset above superset
&supsub;	⫔	U+2AD4	HTML 5.0		ISOamsr	superset above subset
&subsub;	⫕	U+2AD5	HTML 5.0		ISOamsr	subset above subset
&supsup;	⫖	U+2AD6	HTML 5.0		ISOamsr	superset above superset
&suphsub;	⫗	U+2AD7	HTML 5.0		ISOamsr	superset beside subset
&supdsub;	⫘	U+2AD8	HTML 5.0		ISOamsr	superset beside and joined by dash with subset
&forkv;	⫙	U+2AD9	HTML 5.0		ISOamsr	element of opening downwards
&topfork;	⫚	U+2ADA	HTML 5.0		ISOamsr	pitchfork with tee top
&mlcp;	⫛	U+2ADB	HTML 5.0		ISOamsr	transversal intersection
&Dashv; &DoubleLeftTee;	⫤	U+2AE4	HTML 5.0		ISOamsr	vertical bar double left turnstile
&Vdashl;	⫦	U+2AE6	HTML 5.0		ISOamsr	long dash from left member of double vertical
&Barv;	⫧	U+2AE7	HTML 5.0		ISOamsr	short down tack with overbar
&vBar;	⫨	U+2AE8	HTML 5.0		ISOamsr	short up tack with underbar
&vBarv;	⫩	U+2AE9	HTML 5.0		ISOamsr	short up tack above short down tack
&Vbar;	⫫	U+2AEB	HTML 5.0		ISOamsr	double up tack
&Not;	⫬	U+2AEC	HTML 5.0		ISOtech	double stroke not sign
&bNot;	⫭	U+2AED	HTML 5.0		ISOtech	reversed double stroke not sign
&rnmid;	⫮	U+2AEE	HTML 5.0		ISOamsn	does not divide with reversed negation slash
&cirmid;	⫯	U+2AEF	HTML 5.0		ISOamsa	vertical line with circle above
&midcir;	⫰	U+2AF0	HTML 5.0		ISOamsa	vertical line with circle below
&topcir;	⫱	U+2AF1	HTML 5.0		ISOtech	down tack with circle below
&nhpar;	⫲	U+2AF2	HTML 5.0		ISOtech	parallel with horizontal stroke
&parsim;	⫳	U+2AF3	HTML 5.0		ISOamsn	parallel with tilde operator
&parsl;	⫽	U+2AFD	HTML 5.0		ISOtech	double solidus operator (slanted parallel)
&nparsl;	⫽⃥	U+2AFD U+20E5	HTML 5.0		ISOtech	double solidus operator, combining reverse solidus overlay (negated slanted parallel)
&fflig;	ﬀ	U+FB00	HTML 5.0		ISOpub	Latin small ligature ff
&filig;	ﬁ	U+FB01	HTML 5.0		ISOpub	Latin small ligature fi
&fllig;	ﬂ	U+FB02	HTML 5.0		ISOpub	Latin small ligature fl
&ffilig;	ﬃ	U+FB03	HTML 5.0		ISOpub	Latin small ligature ffi
&ffllig;	ﬄ	U+FB04	HTML 5.0		ISOpub	Latin small ligature ffl
&Ascr;	𝒜	U+1D49C	HTML 5.0		ISOmscr	mathematical script capital A
&Cscr;	𝒞	U+1D49E	HTML 5.0		ISOmscr	mathematical script capital C
&Dscr;	𝒟	U+1D49F	HTML 5.0		ISOmscr	mathematical script capital D
&Gscr;	𝒢	U+1D4A2	HTML 5.0		ISOmscr	mathematical script capital G
&Jscr;	𝒥	U+1D4A5	HTML 5.0		ISOmscr	mathematical script capital J
&Kscr;	𝒦	U+1D4A6	HTML 5.0		ISOmscr	mathematical script capital K
&Nscr;	𝒩	U+1D4A9	HTML 5.0		ISOmscr	mathematical script capital N
&Oscr;	𝒪	U+1D4AA	HTML 5.0		ISOmscr	mathematical script capital O
&Pscr;	𝒫	U+1D4AB	HTML 5.0		ISOmscr	mathematical script capital P
&Qscr;	𝒬	U+1D4AC	HTML 5.0		ISOmscr	mathematical script capital Q
&Sscr;	𝒮	U+1D4AE	HTML 5.0		ISOmscr	mathematical script capital S
&Tscr;	𝒯	U+1D4AF	HTML 5.0		ISOmscr	mathematical script capital T
&Uscr;	𝒰	U+1D4B0	HTML 5.0		ISOmscr	mathematical script capital U
&Vscr;	𝒱	U+1D4B1	HTML 5.0		ISOmscr	mathematical script capital V
&Wscr;	𝒲	U+1D4B2	HTML 5.0		ISOmscr	mathematical script capital W
&Xscr;	𝒳	U+1D4B3	HTML 5.0		ISOmscr	mathematical script capital X
&Yscr;	𝒴	U+1D4B4	HTML 5.0		ISOmscr	mathematical script capital Y
&Zscr;	𝒵	U+1D4B5	HTML 5.0		ISOmscr	mathematical script capital Z
&ascr;	𝒶	U+1D4B6	HTML 5.0		ISOmscr	mathematical script small a
&bscr;	𝒷	U+1D4B7	HTML 5.0		ISOmscr	mathematical script small b
&cscr;	𝒸	U+1D4B8	HTML 5.0		ISOmscr	mathematical script small c
&dscr;	𝒹	U+1D4B9	HTML 5.0		ISOmscr	mathematical script small d
&fscr;	𝒻	U+1D4BB	HTML 5.0		ISOmscr	mathematical script small f
&hscr;	𝒽	U+1D4BD	HTML 5.0		ISOmscr	mathematical script small h
&iscr;	𝒾	U+1D4BE	HTML 5.0		ISOmscr	mathematical script small i
&jscr;	𝒿	U+1D4BF	HTML 5.0		ISOmscr	mathematical script small j
&kscr;	𝓀	U+1D4C0	HTML 5.0		ISOmscr	mathematical script small k
&lscr;	𝓁	U+1D4C1	HTML 5.0		ISOmscr	mathematical script small l
&mscr;	𝓂	U+1D4C2	HTML 5.0		ISOmscr	mathematical script small m
&nscr;	𝓃	U+1D4C3	HTML 5.0		ISOmscr	mathematical script small n
&pscr;	𝓅	U+1D4C5	HTML 5.0		ISOmscr	mathematical script small p
&qscr;	𝓆	U+1D4C6	HTML 5.0		ISOmscr	mathematical script small q
&rscr;	𝓇	U+1D4C7	HTML 5.0		ISOmscr	mathematical script small r
&sscr;	𝓈	U+1D4C8	HTML 5.0		ISOmscr	mathematical script small s
&tscr;	𝓉	U+1D4C9	HTML 5.0		ISOmscr	mathematical script small t
&uscr;	𝓊	U+1D4CA	HTML 5.0		ISOmscr	mathematical script small u
&vscr;	𝓋	U+1D4CB	HTML 5.0		ISOmscr	mathematical script small v
&wscr;	𝓌	U+1D4CC	HTML 5.0		ISOmscr	mathematical script small w
&xscr;	𝓍	U+1D4CD	HTML 5.0		ISOmscr	mathematical script small x
&yscr;	𝓎	U+1D4CE	HTML 5.0		ISOmscr	mathematical script small y
&zscr;	𝓏	U+1D4CF	HTML 5.0		ISOmscr	mathematical script small z
&Afr;	𝔄	U+1D504	HTML 5.0		ISOmfrk	mathematical Fraktur capital A
&Bfr;	𝔅	U+1D505	HTML 5.0		ISOmfrk	mathematical Fraktur capital B
&Dfr;	𝔇	U+1D507	HTML 5.0		ISOmfrk	mathematical Fraktur capital D
&Efr;	𝔈	U+1D508	HTML 5.0		ISOmfrk	mathematical Fraktur capital E
&Ffr;	𝔉	U+1D509	HTML 5.0		ISOmfrk	mathematical Fraktur capital F
&Gfr;	𝔊	U+1D50A	HTML 5.0		ISOmfrk	mathematical Fraktur capital G
&Jfr;	𝔍	U+1D50D	HTML 5.0		ISOmfrk	mathematical Fraktur capital J
&Kfr;	𝔎	U+1D50E	HTML 5.0		ISOmfrk	mathematical Fraktur capital K
&Lfr;	𝔏	U+1D50F	HTML 5.0		ISOmfrk	mathematical Fraktur capital L
&Mfr;	𝔐	U+1D510	HTML 5.0		ISOmfrk	mathematical Fraktur capital M
&Nfr;	𝔑	U+1D511	HTML 5.0		ISOmfrk	mathematical Fraktur capital N
&Ofr;	𝔒	U+1D512	HTML 5.0		ISOmfrk	mathematical Fraktur capital O
&Pfr;	𝔓	U+1D513	HTML 5.0		ISOmfrk	mathematical Fraktur capital P
&Qfr;	𝔔	U+1D514	HTML 5.0		ISOmfrk	mathematical Fraktur capital Q
&Sfr;	𝔖	U+1D516	HTML 5.0		ISOmfrk	mathematical Fraktur capital S
&Tfr;	𝔗	U+1D517	HTML 5.0		ISOmfrk	mathematical Fraktur capital T
&Ufr;	𝔘	U+1D518	HTML 5.0		ISOmfrk	mathematical Fraktur capital U
&Vfr;	𝔙	U+1D519	HTML 5.0		ISOmfrk	mathematical Fraktur capital V
&Wfr;	𝔚	U+1D51A	HTML 5.0		ISOmfrk	mathematical Fraktur capital W
&Xfr;	𝔛	U+1D51B	HTML 5.0		ISOmfrk	mathematical Fraktur capital X
&Yfr;	𝔜	U+1D51C	HTML 5.0		ISOmfrk	mathematical Fraktur capital Y
&afr;	𝔞	U+1D51E	HTML 5.0		ISOmfrk	mathematical Fraktur small a
&bfr;	𝔟	U+1D51F	HTML 5.0		ISOmfrk	mathematical Fraktur small b
&cfr;	𝔠	U+1D520	HTML 5.0		ISOmfrk	mathematical Fraktur small c
&dfr;	𝔡	U+1D521	HTML 5.0		ISOmfrk	mathematical Fraktur small d
&efr;	𝔢	U+1D522	HTML 5.0		ISOmfrk	mathematical Fraktur small e
&ffr;	𝔣	U+1D523	HTML 5.0		ISOmfrk	mathematical Fraktur small f
&gfr;	𝔤	U+1D524	HTML 5.0		ISOmfrk	mathematical Fraktur small g
&hfr;	𝔥	U+1D525	HTML 5.0		ISOmfrk	mathematical Fraktur small h
&ifr;	𝔦	U+1D526	HTML 5.0		ISOmfrk	mathematical Fraktur small i
&jfr;	𝔧	U+1D527	HTML 5.0		ISOmfrk	mathematical Fraktur small j
&kfr;	𝔨	U+1D528	HTML 5.0		ISOmfrk	mathematical Fraktur small k
&lfr;	𝔩	U+1D529	HTML 5.0		ISOmfrk	mathematical Fraktur small l
&mfr;	𝔪	U+1D52A	HTML 5.0		ISOmfrk	mathematical Fraktur small m
&nfr;	𝔫	U+1D52B	HTML 5.0		ISOmfrk	mathematical Fraktur small n
&ofr;	𝔬	U+1D52C	HTML 5.0		ISOmfrk	mathematical Fraktur small o
&pfr;	𝔭	U+1D52D	HTML 5.0		ISOmfrk	mathematical Fraktur small p
&qfr;	𝔮	U+1D52E	HTML 5.0		ISOmfrk	mathematical Fraktur small q
&rfr;	𝔯	U+1D52F	HTML 5.0		ISOmfrk	mathematical Fraktur small r
&sfr;	𝔰	U+1D530	HTML 5.0		ISOmfrk	mathematical Fraktur small s
&tfr;	𝔱	U+1D531	HTML 5.0		ISOmfrk	mathematical Fraktur small t
&ufr;	𝔲	U+1D532	HTML 5.0		ISOmfrk	mathematical Fraktur small u
&vfr;	𝔳	U+1D533	HTML 5.0		ISOmfrk	mathematical Fraktur small v
&wfr;	𝔴	U+1D534	HTML 5.0		ISOmfrk	mathematical Fraktur small w
&xfr;	𝔵	U+1D535	HTML 5.0		ISOmfrk	mathematical Fraktur small x
&yfr;	𝔶	U+1D536	HTML 5.0		ISOmfrk	mathematical Fraktur small y
&zfr;	𝔷	U+1D537	HTML 5.0		ISOmfrk	mathematical Fraktur small z
&Aopf;	𝔸	U+1D538	HTML 5.0		ISOmopf	mathematical double-struck capital A (open-face capital A)
&Bopf;	𝔹	U+1D539	HTML 5.0		ISOmopf	mathematical double-struck capital B
&Dopf;	𝔻	U+1D53B	HTML 5.0		ISOmopf	mathematical double-struck capital D
&Eopf;	𝔼	U+1D53C	HTML 5.0		ISOmopf	mathematical double-struck capital E
&Fopf;	𝔽	U+1D53D	HTML 5.0		ISOmopf	mathematical double-struck capital F
&Gopf;	𝔾	U+1D53E	HTML 5.0		ISOmopf	mathematical double-struck capital G
&Iopf;	𝕀	U+1D540	HTML 5.0		ISOmopf	mathematical double-struck capital I
&Jopf;	𝕁	U+1D541	HTML 5.0		ISOmopf	mathematical double-struck capital J
&Kopf;	𝕂	U+1D542	HTML 5.0		ISOmopf	mathematical double-struck capital K
&Lopf;	𝕃	U+1D543	HTML 5.0		ISOmopf	mathematical double-struck capital L
&Mopf;	𝕄	U+1D544	HTML 5.0		ISOmopf	mathematical double-struck capital M
&Oopf;	𝕆	U+1D546	HTML 5.0		ISOmopf	mathematical double-struck capital O
&Sopf;	𝕊	U+1D54A	HTML 5.0		ISOmopf	mathematical double-struck capital S
&Topf;	𝕋	U+1D54B	HTML 5.0		ISOmopf	mathematical double-struck capital T
&Uopf;	𝕌	U+1D54C	HTML 5.0		ISOmopf	mathematical double-struck capital U
&Vopf;	𝕍	U+1D54D	HTML 5.0		ISOmopf	mathematical double-struck capital V
&Wopf;	𝕎	U+1D54E	HTML 5.0		ISOmopf	mathematical double-struck capital W
&Xopf;	𝕏	U+1D54F	HTML 5.0		ISOmopf	mathematical double-struck capital X
&Yopf;	𝕐	U+1D550	HTML 5.0		ISOmopf	mathematical double-struck capital Y
&aopf;	𝕒	U+1D552	HTML 5.0			mathematical double-struck small a (open-face small a)
&bopf;	𝕓	U+1D553	HTML 5.0			mathematical double-struck small b
&copf;	𝕔	U+1D554	HTML 5.0			mathematical double-struck small c
&dopf;	𝕕	U+1D555	HTML 5.0			mathematical double-struck small d
&eopf;	𝕖	U+1D556	HTML 5.0			mathematical double-struck small e
&fopf;	𝕗	U+1D557	HTML 5.0			mathematical double-struck small f
&gopf;	𝕘	U+1D558	HTML 5.0			mathematical double-struck small g
&hopf;	𝕙	U+1D559	HTML 5.0			mathematical double-struck small h
&iopf;	𝕚	U+1D55A	HTML 5.0			mathematical double-struck small i
&jopf;	𝕛	U+1D55B	HTML 5.0			mathematical double-struck small j
&kopf;	𝕜	U+1D55C	HTML 5.0			mathematical double-struck small k
&lopf;	𝕝	U+1D55D	HTML 5.0			mathematical double-struck small l
&mopf;	𝕞	U+1D55E	HTML 5.0			mathematical double-struck small m
&nopf;	𝕟	U+1D55F	HTML 5.0			mathematical double-struck small n
&oopf;	𝕠	U+1D560	HTML 5.0			mathematical double-struck small o
&popf;	𝕡	U+1D561	HTML 5.0			mathematical double-struck small p
&qopf;	𝕢	U+1D562	HTML 5.0			mathematical double-struck small q
&ropf;	𝕣	U+1D563	HTML 5.0			mathematical double-struck small r
&sopf;	𝕤	U+1D564	HTML 5.0			mathematical double-struck small s
&topf;	𝕥	U+1D565	HTML 5.0			mathematical double-struck small t
&uopf;	𝕦	U+1D566	HTML 5.0			mathematical double-struck small u
&vopf;	𝕧	U+1D567	HTML 5.0			mathematical double-struck small v
&wopf;	𝕨	U+1D568	HTML 5.0			mathematical double-struck small w
&xopf;	𝕩	U+1D569	HTML 5.0			mathematical double-struck small x
&yopf;	𝕪	U+1D56A	HTML 5.0			mathematical double-struck small y
&zopf;	𝕫	U+1D56B	HTML 5.0			mathematical double-struck small z

== Entities representing special characters in XHTML ==
The XHTML DTDs explicitly declare 253 entities (including the 5 predefined entities of XML 1.0) whose expansion is a single character, which can therefore be informally referred to as "character entities". These (with the exception of the &apos; entity) have the same names and represent the same characters as the 252 character entities in HTML 4.0. Also, by virtue of being XML, XHTML documents may reference the predefined &apos; entity, which is not one of the 252 character entities in HTML 4.0. Additional entities of any size may be defined on a per-document basis. However, the usability of entity references in XHTML is affected by how the document is being processed:

- Legacy abbreviated character entities (without the final colon) inherited from HTML 2.0 (and still supported in HTML 5.0) are not supported in XML 1.0 and XHTML; the trailing semicolon must be present in all entity references used in XML and XHTML documents.
- If the XHTML document is read by a conforming HTML 4.0 processor, then only the 252 HTML 4.0 character entities may safely be used. The use of &apos; or custom entity references may not be supported and may produce unpredictable results (it is recommended to use the numerical character reference &#39; instead).
- If the document is read by an XML parser that does not or cannot read external entities, then only the five built-in XML character entities can safely be used, although other entities may be used if they are declared in the internal DTD subset. However, modern XML parsers recognize and implement a builtin cache for SGML references to DTDs used by all standard versions of HTML, XHTML, SVG and MathML, without needing to parse and process the external DTD via their URL and without needing to process entities defined in an internal DTD subset of the document.
- If the document is read by an XML parser that does read external entities and does not implement a builtin cache for well-known DTDs, then the five built-in XML character entities (and numeric character references) can safely be used. The other 248 HTML character entities can be used as long as the XHTML DTD is accessible to the parser at the time the document is read. Other entities may also be used if they are declared in the internal DTD subset and the XML processor can parse internal DTD subsets.
- HTML 5.0 parsers cannot process XHTML documents, and it's impossible to define a fully validating DTD for HTML5 documents encoded with the XHTML syntax (notably it's impossible to validate all attributes names, notably "data-*" attributes); as well it's still impossible to fully validate (with W3C standard schemas for XML, such as XSD or relax NG) HTML5 documents represented in the XHTML syntax, and for now a custom validator specific to HTML 5.0 is required.

Because of the special &apos; case mentioned above, only &quot;, &amp;, &lt;, and &gt; will work in all XHTML processing situations.

== See also ==
- Character encodings in HTML
- Digraph and Trigraph, a similar concept to enter unavailable characters
- Escape character
- HTML decimal character rendering
- Percent-encoding, used in URLs
- SGML entity
