= Mathematical operators and symbols in Unicode =

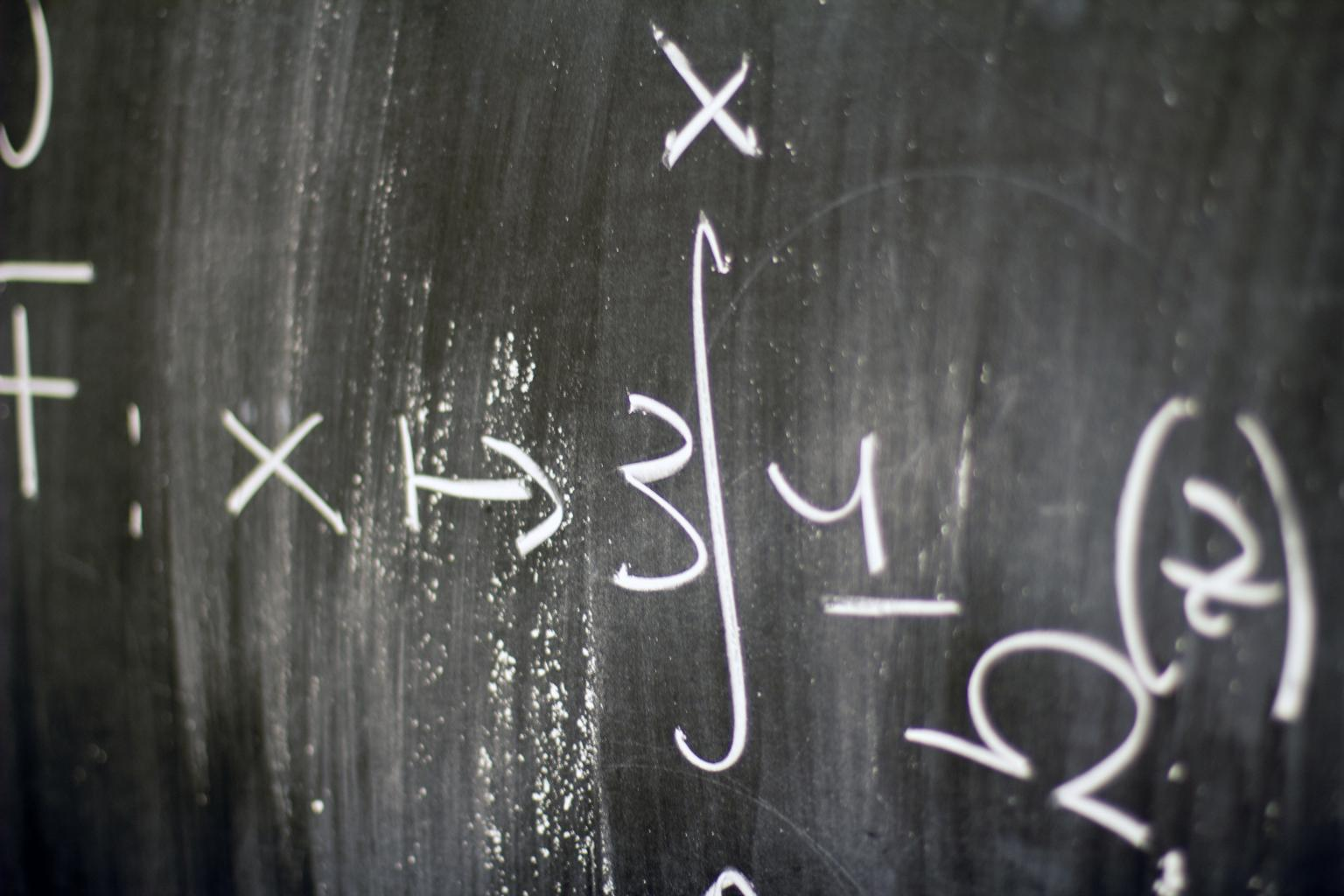
Blackboard at the Laurent Schwartz Center for Mathematics, École Polytechnique

The Unicode Standard encodes almost all standard characters used in mathematics. Unicode Technical Report #25 provides comprehensive information about the character repertoire, their properties, and guidelines for implementation. Mathematical operators and symbols are in multiple Unicode blocks. Some of these blocks are dedicated to, or primarily contain, mathematical characters while others are a mix of mathematical and non-mathematical characters. This article covers all Unicode characters with a derived property of "Math".

== Dedicated blocks ==
=== Mathematical Operators block ===
The Mathematical Operators block (U+2200–U+22FF) contains characters for mathematical, logical, and set notation.

Mathematical Operators^{[1]} Official Unicode Consortium code chart (PDF)
	0	1	2	3	4	5	6	7	8	9	A	B	C	D	E	F
U+220x	∀	∁	∂	∃	∄	∅	∆	∇	∈	∉	∊	∋	∌	∍	∎	∏
U+221x	∐	∑	−	∓	∔	∕	∖	∗	∘	∙	√	∛	∜	∝	∞	∟
U+222x	∠	∡	∢	∣	∤	∥	∦	∧	∨	∩	∪	∫	∬	∭	∮	∯
U+223x	∰	∱	∲	∳	∴	∵	∶	∷	∸	∹	∺	∻	∼	∽	∾	∿
U+224x	≀	≁	≂	≃	≄	≅	≆	≇	≈	≉	≊	≋	≌	≍	≎	≏
U+225x	≐	≑	≒	≓	≔	≕	≖	≗	≘	≙	≚	≛	≜	≝	≞	≟
U+226x	≠	≡	≢	≣	≤	≥	≦	≧	≨	≩	≪	≫	≬	≭	≮	≯
U+227x	≰	≱	≲	≳	≴	≵	≶	≷	≸	≹	≺	≻	≼	≽	≾	≿
U+228x	⊀	⊁	⊂	⊃	⊄	⊅	⊆	⊇	⊈	⊉	⊊	⊋	⊌	⊍	⊎	⊏
U+229x	⊐	⊑	⊒	⊓	⊔	⊕	⊖	⊗	⊘	⊙	⊚	⊛	⊜	⊝	⊞	⊟
U+22Ax	⊠	⊡	⊢	⊣	⊤	⊥	⊦	⊧	⊨	⊩	⊪	⊫	⊬	⊭	⊮	⊯
U+22Bx	⊰	⊱	⊲	⊳	⊴	⊵	⊶	⊷	⊸	⊹	⊺	⊻	⊼	⊽	⊾	⊿
U+22Cx	⋀	⋁	⋂	⋃	⋄	⋅	⋆	⋇	⋈	⋉	⋊	⋋	⋌	⋍	⋎	⋏
U+22Dx	⋐	⋑	⋒	⋓	⋔	⋕	⋖	⋗	⋘	⋙	⋚	⋛	⋜	⋝	⋞	⋟
U+22Ex	⋠	⋡	⋢	⋣	⋤	⋥	⋦	⋧	⋨	⋩	⋪	⋫	⋬	⋭	⋮	⋯
U+22Fx	⋰	⋱	⋲	⋳	⋴	⋵	⋶	⋷	⋸	⋹	⋺	⋻	⋼	⋽	⋾	⋿
Notes 1.As of Unicode version 18.0

=== Supplemental Mathematical Operators block ===
The Supplemental Mathematical Operators block (U+2A00–U+2AFF) contains various mathematical symbols, including N-ary operators, summations and integrals, intersections and unions, logical and relational operators, and subset/superset relations.

Supplemental Mathematical Operators^{[1]} Official Unicode Consortium code chart (PDF)
	0	1	2	3	4	5	6	7	8	9	A	B	C	D	E	F
U+2A0x	⨀	⨁	⨂	⨃	⨄	⨅	⨆	⨇	⨈	⨉	⨊	⨋	⨌	⨍	⨎	⨏
U+2A1x	⨐	⨑	⨒	⨓	⨔	⨕	⨖	⨗	⨘	⨙	⨚	⨛	⨜	⨝	⨞	⨟
U+2A2x	⨠	⨡	⨢	⨣	⨤	⨥	⨦	⨧	⨨	⨩	⨪	⨫	⨬	⨭	⨮	⨯
U+2A3x	⨰	⨱	⨲	⨳	⨴	⨵	⨶	⨷	⨸	⨹	⨺	⨻	⨼	⨽	⨾	⨿
U+2A4x	⩀	⩁	⩂	⩃	⩄	⩅	⩆	⩇	⩈	⩉	⩊	⩋	⩌	⩍	⩎	⩏
U+2A5x	⩐	⩑	⩒	⩓	⩔	⩕	⩖	⩗	⩘	⩙	⩚	⩛	⩜	⩝	⩞	⩟
U+2A6x	⩠	⩡	⩢	⩣	⩤	⩥	⩦	⩧	⩨	⩩	⩪	⩫	⩬	⩭	⩮	⩯
U+2A7x	⩰	⩱	⩲	⩳	⩴	⩵	⩶	⩷	⩸	⩹	⩺	⩻	⩼	⩽	⩾	⩿
U+2A8x	⪀	⪁	⪂	⪃	⪄	⪅	⪆	⪇	⪈	⪉	⪊	⪋	⪌	⪍	⪎	⪏
U+2A9x	⪐	⪑	⪒	⪓	⪔	⪕	⪖	⪗	⪘	⪙	⪚	⪛	⪜	⪝	⪞	⪟
U+2AAx	⪠	⪡	⪢	⪣	⪤	⪥	⪦	⪧	⪨	⪩	⪪	⪫	⪬	⪭	⪮	⪯
U+2ABx	⪰	⪱	⪲	⪳	⪴	⪵	⪶	⪷	⪸	⪹	⪺	⪻	⪼	⪽	⪾	⪿
U+2ACx	⫀	⫁	⫂	⫃	⫄	⫅	⫆	⫇	⫈	⫉	⫊	⫋	⫌	⫍	⫎	⫏
U+2ADx	⫐	⫑	⫒	⫓	⫔	⫕	⫖	⫗	⫘	⫙	⫚	⫛	⫝̸	⫝	⫞	⫟
U+2AEx	⫠	⫡	⫢	⫣	⫤	⫥	⫦	⫧	⫨	⫩	⫪	⫫	⫬	⫭	⫮	⫯
U+2AFx	⫰	⫱	⫲	⫳	⫴	⫵	⫶	⫷	⫸	⫹	⫺	⫻	⫼	⫽	⫾	⫿
Notes 1.As of Unicode version 18.0

=== Mathematical Alphanumeric Symbols block ===
The Mathematical Alphanumeric Symbols block (U+1D400–U+1D7FF) contains Latin and Greek letters and decimal digits that enable mathematicians to denote different notions with different letter styles. The reserved code points (the "holes") in the alphabetic ranges up to U+1D551 duplicate characters in the Letterlike Symbols block. In order, these are: ℎ / ℬ ℰ ℱ ℋ ℐ ℒ ℳ ℛ / ℯ ℊ ℴ / ℭ ℌ ℑ ℜ ℨ / ℂ ℍ ℕ ℙ ℚ ℝ ℤ.

Mathematical Alphanumeric Symbols^{[1]}^{[2]} Official Unicode Consortium code chart (PDF)
	0	1	2	3	4	5	6	7	8	9	A	B	C	D	E	F
U+1D40x	𝐀	𝐁	𝐂	𝐃	𝐄	𝐅	𝐆	𝐇	𝐈	𝐉	𝐊	𝐋	𝐌	𝐍	𝐎	𝐏
U+1D41x	𝐐	𝐑	𝐒	𝐓	𝐔	𝐕	𝐖	𝐗	𝐘	𝐙	𝐚	𝐛	𝐜	𝐝	𝐞	𝐟
U+1D42x	𝐠	𝐡	𝐢	𝐣	𝐤	𝐥	𝐦	𝐧	𝐨	𝐩	𝐪	𝐫	𝐬	𝐭	𝐮	𝐯
U+1D43x	𝐰	𝐱	𝐲	𝐳	𝐴	𝐵	𝐶	𝐷	𝐸	𝐹	𝐺	𝐻	𝐼	𝐽	𝐾	𝐿
U+1D44x	𝑀	𝑁	𝑂	𝑃	𝑄	𝑅	𝑆	𝑇	𝑈	𝑉	𝑊	𝑋	𝑌	𝑍	𝑎	𝑏
U+1D45x	𝑐	𝑑	𝑒	𝑓	𝑔		𝑖	𝑗	𝑘	𝑙	𝑚	𝑛	𝑜	𝑝	𝑞	𝑟
U+1D46x	𝑠	𝑡	𝑢	𝑣	𝑤	𝑥	𝑦	𝑧	𝑨	𝑩	𝑪	𝑫	𝑬	𝑭	𝑮	𝑯
U+1D47x	𝑰	𝑱	𝑲	𝑳	𝑴	𝑵	𝑶	𝑷	𝑸	𝑹	𝑺	𝑻	𝑼	𝑽	𝑾	𝑿
U+1D48x	𝒀	𝒁	𝒂	𝒃	𝒄	𝒅	𝒆	𝒇	𝒈	𝒉	𝒊	𝒋	𝒌	𝒍	𝒎	𝒏
U+1D49x	𝒐	𝒑	𝒒	𝒓	𝒔	𝒕	𝒖	𝒗	𝒘	𝒙	𝒚	𝒛	𝒜		𝒞	𝒟
U+1D4Ax			𝒢			𝒥	𝒦			𝒩	𝒪	𝒫	𝒬		𝒮	𝒯
U+1D4Bx	𝒰	𝒱	𝒲	𝒳	𝒴	𝒵	𝒶	𝒷	𝒸	𝒹		𝒻		𝒽	𝒾	𝒿
U+1D4Cx	𝓀	𝓁	𝓂	𝓃		𝓅	𝓆	𝓇	𝓈	𝓉	𝓊	𝓋	𝓌	𝓍	𝓎	𝓏
U+1D4Dx	𝓐	𝓑	𝓒	𝓓	𝓔	𝓕	𝓖	𝓗	𝓘	𝓙	𝓚	𝓛	𝓜	𝓝	𝓞	𝓟
U+1D4Ex	𝓠	𝓡	𝓢	𝓣	𝓤	𝓥	𝓦	𝓧	𝓨	𝓩	𝓪	𝓫	𝓬	𝓭	𝓮	𝓯
U+1D4Fx	𝓰	𝓱	𝓲	𝓳	𝓴	𝓵	𝓶	𝓷	𝓸	𝓹	𝓺	𝓻	𝓼	𝓽	𝓾	𝓿
U+1D50x	𝔀	𝔁	𝔂	𝔃	𝔄	𝔅		𝔇	𝔈	𝔉	𝔊			𝔍	𝔎	𝔏
U+1D51x	𝔐	𝔑	𝔒	𝔓	𝔔		𝔖	𝔗	𝔘	𝔙	𝔚	𝔛	𝔜		𝔞	𝔟
U+1D52x	𝔠	𝔡	𝔢	𝔣	𝔤	𝔥	𝔦	𝔧	𝔨	𝔩	𝔪	𝔫	𝔬	𝔭	𝔮	𝔯
U+1D53x	𝔰	𝔱	𝔲	𝔳	𝔴	𝔵	𝔶	𝔷	𝔸	𝔹		𝔻	𝔼	𝔽	𝔾	
U+1D54x	𝕀	𝕁	𝕂	𝕃	𝕄		𝕆				𝕊	𝕋	𝕌	𝕍	𝕎	𝕏
U+1D55x	𝕐		𝕒	𝕓	𝕔	𝕕	𝕖	𝕗	𝕘	𝕙	𝕚	𝕛	𝕜	𝕝	𝕞	𝕟
U+1D56x	𝕠	𝕡	𝕢	𝕣	𝕤	𝕥	𝕦	𝕧	𝕨	𝕩	𝕪	𝕫	𝕬	𝕭	𝕮	𝕯
U+1D57x	𝕰	𝕱	𝕲	𝕳	𝕴	𝕵	𝕶	𝕷	𝕸	𝕹	𝕺	𝕻	𝕼	𝕽	𝕾	𝕿
U+1D58x	𝖀	𝖁	𝖂	𝖃	𝖄	𝖅	𝖆	𝖇	𝖈	𝖉	𝖊	𝖋	𝖌	𝖍	𝖎	𝖏
U+1D59x	𝖐	𝖑	𝖒	𝖓	𝖔	𝖕	𝖖	𝖗	𝖘	𝖙	𝖚	𝖛	𝖜	𝖝	𝖞	𝖟
U+1D5Ax	𝖠	𝖡	𝖢	𝖣	𝖤	𝖥	𝖦	𝖧	𝖨	𝖩	𝖪	𝖫	𝖬	𝖭	𝖮	𝖯
U+1D5Bx	𝖰	𝖱	𝖲	𝖳	𝖴	𝖵	𝖶	𝖷	𝖸	𝖹	𝖺	𝖻	𝖼	𝖽	𝖾	𝖿
U+1D5Cx	𝗀	𝗁	𝗂	𝗃	𝗄	𝗅	𝗆	𝗇	𝗈	𝗉	𝗊	𝗋	𝗌	𝗍	𝗎	𝗏
U+1D5Dx	𝗐	𝗑	𝗒	𝗓	𝗔	𝗕	𝗖	𝗗	𝗘	𝗙	𝗚	𝗛	𝗜	𝗝	𝗞	𝗟
U+1D5Ex	𝗠	𝗡	𝗢	𝗣	𝗤	𝗥	𝗦	𝗧	𝗨	𝗩	𝗪	𝗫	𝗬	𝗭	𝗮	𝗯
U+1D5Fx	𝗰	𝗱	𝗲	𝗳	𝗴	𝗵	𝗶	𝗷	𝗸	𝗹	𝗺	𝗻	𝗼	𝗽	𝗾	𝗿
U+1D60x	𝘀	𝘁	𝘂	𝘃	𝘄	𝘅	𝘆	𝘇	𝘈	𝘉	𝘊	𝘋	𝘌	𝘍	𝘎	𝘏
U+1D61x	𝘐	𝘑	𝘒	𝘓	𝘔	𝘕	𝘖	𝘗	𝘘	𝘙	𝘚	𝘛	𝘜	𝘝	𝘞	𝘟
U+1D62x	𝘠	𝘡	𝘢	𝘣	𝘤	𝘥	𝘦	𝘧	𝘨	𝘩	𝘪	𝘫	𝘬	𝘭	𝘮	𝘯
U+1D63x	𝘰	𝘱	𝘲	𝘳	𝘴	𝘵	𝘶	𝘷	𝘸	𝘹	𝘺	𝘻	𝘼	𝘽	𝘾	𝘿
U+1D64x	𝙀	𝙁	𝙂	𝙃	𝙄	𝙅	𝙆	𝙇	𝙈	𝙉	𝙊	𝙋	𝙌	𝙍	𝙎	𝙏
U+1D65x	𝙐	𝙑	𝙒	𝙓	𝙔	𝙕	𝙖	𝙗	𝙘	𝙙	𝙚	𝙛	𝙜	𝙝	𝙞	𝙟
U+1D66x	𝙠	𝙡	𝙢	𝙣	𝙤	𝙥	𝙦	𝙧	𝙨	𝙩	𝙪	𝙫	𝙬	𝙭	𝙮	𝙯
U+1D67x	𝙰	𝙱	𝙲	𝙳	𝙴	𝙵	𝙶	𝙷	𝙸	𝙹	𝙺	𝙻	𝙼	𝙽	𝙾	𝙿
U+1D68x	𝚀	𝚁	𝚂	𝚃	𝚄	𝚅	𝚆	𝚇	𝚈	𝚉	𝚊	𝚋	𝚌	𝚍	𝚎	𝚏
U+1D69x	𝚐	𝚑	𝚒	𝚓	𝚔	𝚕	𝚖	𝚗	𝚘	𝚙	𝚚	𝚛	𝚜	𝚝	𝚞	𝚟
U+1D6Ax	𝚠	𝚡	𝚢	𝚣	𝚤	𝚥	𝚦		𝚨	𝚩	𝚪	𝚫	𝚬	𝚭	𝚮	𝚯
U+1D6Bx	𝚰	𝚱	𝚲	𝚳	𝚴	𝚵	𝚶	𝚷	𝚸	𝚹	𝚺	𝚻	𝚼	𝚽	𝚾	𝚿
U+1D6Cx	𝛀	𝛁	𝛂	𝛃	𝛄	𝛅	𝛆	𝛇	𝛈	𝛉	𝛊	𝛋	𝛌	𝛍	𝛎	𝛏
U+1D6Dx	𝛐	𝛑	𝛒	𝛓	𝛔	𝛕	𝛖	𝛗	𝛘	𝛙	𝛚	𝛛	𝛜	𝛝	𝛞	𝛟
U+1D6Ex	𝛠	𝛡	𝛢	𝛣	𝛤	𝛥	𝛦	𝛧	𝛨	𝛩	𝛪	𝛫	𝛬	𝛭	𝛮	𝛯
U+1D6Fx	𝛰	𝛱	𝛲	𝛳	𝛴	𝛵	𝛶	𝛷	𝛸	𝛹	𝛺	𝛻	𝛼	𝛽	𝛾	𝛿
U+1D70x	𝜀	𝜁	𝜂	𝜃	𝜄	𝜅	𝜆	𝜇	𝜈	𝜉	𝜊	𝜋	𝜌	𝜍	𝜎	𝜏
U+1D71x	𝜐	𝜑	𝜒	𝜓	𝜔	𝜕	𝜖	𝜗	𝜘	𝜙	𝜚	𝜛	𝜜	𝜝	𝜞	𝜟
U+1D72x	𝜠	𝜡	𝜢	𝜣	𝜤	𝜥	𝜦	𝜧	𝜨	𝜩	𝜪	𝜫	𝜬	𝜭	𝜮	𝜯
U+1D73x	𝜰	𝜱	𝜲	𝜳	𝜴	𝜵	𝜶	𝜷	𝜸	𝜹	𝜺	𝜻	𝜼	𝜽	𝜾	𝜿
U+1D74x	𝝀	𝝁	𝝂	𝝃	𝝄	𝝅	𝝆	𝝇	𝝈	𝝉	𝝊	𝝋	𝝌	𝝍	𝝎	𝝏
U+1D75x	𝝐	𝝑	𝝒	𝝓	𝝔	𝝕	𝝖	𝝗	𝝘	𝝙	𝝚	𝝛	𝝜	𝝝	𝝞	𝝟
U+1D76x	𝝠	𝝡	𝝢	𝝣	𝝤	𝝥	𝝦	𝝧	𝝨	𝝩	𝝪	𝝫	𝝬	𝝭	𝝮	𝝯
U+1D77x	𝝰	𝝱	𝝲	𝝳	𝝴	𝝵	𝝶	𝝷	𝝸	𝝹	𝝺	𝝻	𝝼	𝝽	𝝾	𝝿
U+1D78x	𝞀	𝞁	𝞂	𝞃	𝞄	𝞅	𝞆	𝞇	𝞈	𝞉	𝞊	𝞋	𝞌	𝞍	𝞎	𝞏
U+1D79x	𝞐	𝞑	𝞒	𝞓	𝞔	𝞕	𝞖	𝞗	𝞘	𝞙	𝞚	𝞛	𝞜	𝞝	𝞞	𝞟
U+1D7Ax	𝞠	𝞡	𝞢	𝞣	𝞤	𝞥	𝞦	𝞧	𝞨	𝞩	𝞪	𝞫	𝞬	𝞭	𝞮	𝞯
U+1D7Bx	𝞰	𝞱	𝞲	𝞳	𝞴	𝞵	𝞶	𝞷	𝞸	𝞹	𝞺	𝞻	𝞼	𝞽	𝞾	𝞿
U+1D7Cx	𝟀	𝟁	𝟂	𝟃	𝟄	𝟅	𝟆	𝟇	𝟈	𝟉	𝟊	𝟋			𝟎	𝟏
U+1D7Dx	𝟐	𝟑	𝟒	𝟓	𝟔	𝟕	𝟖	𝟗	𝟘	𝟙	𝟚	𝟛	𝟜	𝟝	𝟞	𝟟
U+1D7Ex	𝟠	𝟡	𝟢	𝟣	𝟤	𝟥	𝟦	𝟧	𝟨	𝟩	𝟪	𝟫	𝟬	𝟭	𝟮	𝟯
U+1D7Fx	𝟰	𝟱	𝟲	𝟳	𝟴	𝟵	𝟶	𝟷	𝟸	𝟹	𝟺	𝟻	𝟼	𝟽	𝟾	𝟿
Notes 1.As of Unicode version 18.0 2.Grey areas indicate non-assigned code points

=== Letterlike Symbols block ===
The Letterlike Symbols block (U+2100–U+214F) includes variables. Most alphabetic math symbols are in the Mathematical Alphanumeric Symbols block shown above.

The math subset of this block is U+2102, U+2107, U+210A–U+2113, U+2115, U+2118–U+211D, U+2124, U+2128–U+2129, U+212C–U+212D, U+212F–U+2131, U+2133–U+2138, U+213C–U+2149, and U+214B.

Letterlike Symbols^{[1]} Official Unicode Consortium code chart (PDF)
	0	1	2	3	4	5	6	7	8	9	A	B	C	D	E	F
U+210x	℀	℁	ℂ	℃	℄	℅	℆	ℇ	℈	℉	ℊ	ℋ	ℌ	ℍ	ℎ	ℏ
U+211x	ℐ	ℑ	ℒ	ℓ	℔	ℕ	№	℗	℘	ℙ	ℚ	ℛ	ℜ	ℝ	℞	℟
U+212x	℠	℡	™	℣	ℤ	℥	Ω	℧	ℨ	℩	K	Å	ℬ	ℭ	℮	ℯ
U+213x	ℰ	ℱ	Ⅎ	ℳ	ℴ	ℵ	ℶ	ℷ	ℸ	ℹ	℺	℻	ℼ	ℽ	ℾ	ℿ
U+214x	⅀	⅁	⅂	⅃	⅄	ⅅ	ⅆ	ⅇ	ⅈ	ⅉ	⅊	⅋	⅌	⅍	ⅎ	⅏
Notes 1.As of Unicode version 18.0

=== Miscellaneous Mathematical Symbols-A block ===
The Miscellaneous Mathematical Symbols-A block (U+27C0–U+27EF) contains characters for mathematical, logical, and database notation.

Miscellaneous Mathematical Symbols-A^{[1]} Official Unicode Consortium code chart (PDF)
	0	1	2	3	4	5	6	7	8	9	A	B	C	D	E	F
U+27Cx	⟀	⟁	⟂	⟃	⟄	⟅	⟆	⟇	⟈	⟉	⟊	⟋	⟌	⟍	⟎	⟏
U+27Dx	⟐	⟑	⟒	⟓	⟔	⟕	⟖	⟗	⟘	⟙	⟚	⟛	⟜	⟝	⟞	⟟
U+27Ex	⟠	⟡	⟢	⟣	⟤	⟥	⟦	⟧	⟨	⟩	⟪	⟫	⟬	⟭	⟮	⟯
Notes 1.As of Unicode version 18.0

=== Miscellaneous Mathematical Symbols-B block ===
The Miscellaneous Mathematical Symbols-B block (U+2980–U+29FF) contains miscellaneous mathematical symbols, including brackets, angles, and circle symbols.

Miscellaneous Mathematical Symbols-B^{[1]} Official Unicode Consortium code chart (PDF)
	0	1	2	3	4	5	6	7	8	9	A	B	C	D	E	F
U+298x	⦀	⦁	⦂	⦃	⦄	⦅	⦆	⦇	⦈	⦉	⦊	⦋	⦌	⦍	⦎	⦏
U+299x	⦐	⦑	⦒	⦓	⦔	⦕	⦖	⦗	⦘	⦙	⦚	⦛	⦜	⦝	⦞	⦟
U+29Ax	⦠	⦡	⦢	⦣	⦤	⦥	⦦	⦧	⦨	⦩	⦪	⦫	⦬	⦭	⦮	⦯
U+29Bx	⦰	⦱	⦲	⦳	⦴	⦵	⦶	⦷	⦸	⦹	⦺	⦻	⦼	⦽	⦾	⦿
U+29Cx	⧀	⧁	⧂	⧃	⧄	⧅	⧆	⧇	⧈	⧉	⧊	⧋	⧌	⧍	⧎	⧏
U+29Dx	⧐	⧑	⧒	⧓	⧔	⧕	⧖	⧗	⧘	⧙	⧚	⧛	⧜	⧝	⧞	⧟
U+29Ex	⧠	⧡	⧢	⧣	⧤	⧥	⧦	⧧	⧨	⧩	⧪	⧫	⧬	⧭	⧮	⧯
U+29Fx	⧰	⧱	⧲	⧳	⧴	⧵	⧶	⧷	⧸	⧹	⧺	⧻	⧼	⧽	⧾	⧿
Notes 1.As of Unicode version 18.0

=== Miscellaneous Technical block ===
The Miscellaneous Technical block (U+2300–U+23FF) includes braces and operators.

The math subset of this block is U+2308–U+230B, U+2320–U+2321, U+237C, U+239B–U+23B5, 23B7, U+23D0, and U+23DC–U+23E2.

Miscellaneous Technical^{[1]}^{[2]} Official Unicode Consortium code chart (PDF)
	0	1	2	3	4	5	6	7	8	9	A	B	C	D	E	F
U+230x	⌀	⌁	⌂	⌃	⌄	⌅	⌆	⌇	⌈	⌉	⌊	⌋	⌌	⌍	⌎	⌏
U+231x	⌐	⌑	⌒	⌓	⌔	⌕	⌖	⌗	⌘	⌙	⌚	⌛	⌜	⌝	⌞	⌟
U+232x	⌠	⌡	⌢	⌣	⌤	⌥	⌦	⌧	⌨	〈	〉	⌫	⌬	⌭	⌮	⌯
U+233x	⌰	⌱	⌲	⌳	⌴	⌵	⌶	⌷	⌸	⌹	⌺	⌻	⌼	⌽	⌾	⌿
U+234x	⍀	⍁	⍂	⍃	⍄	⍅	⍆	⍇	⍈	⍉	⍊	⍋	⍌	⍍	⍎	⍏
U+235x	⍐	⍑	⍒	⍓	⍔	⍕	⍖	⍗	⍘	⍙	⍚	⍛	⍜	⍝	⍞	⍟
U+236x	⍠	⍡	⍢	⍣	⍤	⍥	⍦	⍧	⍨	⍩	⍪	⍫	⍬	⍭	⍮	⍯
U+237x	⍰	⍱	⍲	⍳	⍴	⍵	⍶	⍷	⍸	⍹	⍺	⍻	⍼	⍽	⍾	⍿
U+238x	⎀	⎁	⎂	⎃	⎄	⎅	⎆	⎇	⎈	⎉	⎊	⎋	⎌	⎍	⎎	⎏
U+239x	⎐	⎑	⎒	⎓	⎔	⎕	⎖	⎗	⎘	⎙	⎚	⎛	⎜	⎝	⎞	⎟
U+23Ax	⎠	⎡	⎢	⎣	⎤	⎥	⎦	⎧	⎨	⎩	⎪	⎫	⎬	⎭	⎮	⎯
U+23Bx	⎰	⎱	⎲	⎳	⎴	⎵	⎶	⎷	⎸	⎹	⎺	⎻	⎼	⎽	⎾	⎿
U+23Cx	⏀	⏁	⏂	⏃	⏄	⏅	⏆	⏇	⏈	⏉	⏊	⏋	⏌	⏍	⏎	⏏
U+23Dx	⏐	⏑	⏒	⏓	⏔	⏕	⏖	⏗	⏘	⏙	⏚	⏛	⏜	⏝	⏞	⏟
U+23Ex	⏠	⏡	⏢	⏣	⏤	⏥	⏦	⏧	⏨	⏩	⏪	⏫	⏬	⏭	⏮	⏯
U+23Fx	⏰	⏱	⏲	⏳	⏴	⏵	⏶	⏷	⏸	⏹	⏺	⏻	⏼	⏽	⏾	⏿
Notes 1.As of Unicode version 18.0 2.Unicode code points U+2329 and U+232A are deprecated as of Unicode version 5.2

=== Geometric Shapes block ===
The Geometric Shapes block (U+25A0–U+25FF) contains geometric shape symbols.

The math subset of this block is U+25A0–25A1, U+25AE–25B7, U+25BC–25C1, U+25C6–25C7, U+25CA–25CB, U+25CF–25D3, U+25E2, U+25E4, U+25E7–25EC, and U+25F8–25FF.

Geometric Shapes^{[1]} Official Unicode Consortium code chart (PDF)
	0	1	2	3	4	5	6	7	8	9	A	B	C	D	E	F
U+25Ax	■	□	▢	▣	▤	▥	▦	▧	▨	▩	▪	▫	▬	▭	▮	▯
U+25Bx	▰	▱	▲	△	▴	▵	▶	▷	▸	▹	►	▻	▼	▽	▾	▿
U+25Cx	◀	◁	◂	◃	◄	◅	◆	◇	◈	◉	◊	○	◌	◍	◎	●
U+25Dx	◐	◑	◒	◓	◔	◕	◖	◗	◘	◙	◚	◛	◜	◝	◞	◟
U+25Ex	◠	◡	◢	◣	◤	◥	◦	◧	◨	◩	◪	◫	◬	◭	◮	◯
U+25Fx	◰	◱	◲	◳	◴	◵	◶	◷	◸	◹	◺	◻	◼	◽	◾	◿
Notes 1.As of Unicode version 18.0

=== Arrows block ===
The Arrows block (U+2190–U+21FF) contains line, curve, and semicircle arrows and arrow-like operators.

The math subset of this block is U+2190–U+21A7, U+21A9–U+21AE, U+21B0–U+21B1, U+21B6–U+21B7, U+21BC–U+21DB, U+21DD, U+21E4–U+21E5, U+21F4–U+21FF.

Arrows^{[1]} Official Unicode Consortium code chart (PDF)
	0	1	2	3	4	5	6	7	8	9	A	B	C	D	E	F
U+219x	←	↑	→	↓	↔	↕	↖	↗	↘	↙	↚	↛	↜	↝	↞	↟
U+21Ax	↠	↡	↢	↣	↤	↥	↦	↧	↨	↩	↪	↫	↬	↭	↮	↯
U+21Bx	↰	↱	↲	↳	↴	↵	↶	↷	↸	↹	↺	↻	↼	↽	↾	↿
U+21Cx	⇀	⇁	⇂	⇃	⇄	⇅	⇆	⇇	⇈	⇉	⇊	⇋	⇌	⇍	⇎	⇏
U+21Dx	⇐	⇑	⇒	⇓	⇔	⇕	⇖	⇗	⇘	⇙	⇚	⇛	⇜	⇝	⇞	⇟
U+21Ex	⇠	⇡	⇢	⇣	⇤	⇥	⇦	⇧	⇨	⇩	⇪	⇫	⇬	⇭	⇮	⇯
U+21Fx	⇰	⇱	⇲	⇳	⇴	⇵	⇶	⇷	⇸	⇹	⇺	⇻	⇼	⇽	⇾	⇿
Notes 1.As of Unicode version 18.0

=== Supplemental Arrows-A block ===
The Supplemental Arrows-A block (U+27F0–U+27FF) contains arrows and arrow-like operators.

Supplemental Arrows-A^{[1]} Official Unicode Consortium code chart (PDF)
	0	1	2	3	4	5	6	7	8	9	A	B	C	D	E	F
U+27Fx	⟰	⟱	⟲	⟳	⟴	⟵	⟶	⟷	⟸	⟹	⟺	⟻	⟼	⟽	⟾	⟿
Notes 1.As of Unicode version 18.0

=== Supplemental Arrows-B block ===
The Supplemental Arrows-B block (U+2900–U+297F) contains arrows and arrow-like operators (arrow tails, crossing arrows, curved arrows, and harpoons).

Supplemental Arrows-B^{[1]} Official Unicode Consortium code chart (PDF)
	0	1	2	3	4	5	6	7	8	9	A	B	C	D	E	F
U+290x	⤀	⤁	⤂	⤃	⤄	⤅	⤆	⤇	⤈	⤉	⤊	⤋	⤌	⤍	⤎	⤏
U+291x	⤐	⤑	⤒	⤓	⤔	⤕	⤖	⤗	⤘	⤙	⤚	⤛	⤜	⤝	⤞	⤟
U+292x	⤠	⤡	⤢	⤣	⤤	⤥	⤦	⤧	⤨	⤩	⤪	⤫	⤬	⤭	⤮	⤯
U+293x	⤰	⤱	⤲	⤳	⤴	⤵	⤶	⤷	⤸	⤹	⤺	⤻	⤼	⤽	⤾	⤿
U+294x	⥀	⥁	⥂	⥃	⥄	⥅	⥆	⥇	⥈	⥉	⥊	⥋	⥌	⥍	⥎	⥏
U+295x	⥐	⥑	⥒	⥓	⥔	⥕	⥖	⥗	⥘	⥙	⥚	⥛	⥜	⥝	⥞	⥟
U+296x	⥠	⥡	⥢	⥣	⥤	⥥	⥦	⥧	⥨	⥩	⥪	⥫	⥬	⥭	⥮	⥯
U+297x	⥰	⥱	⥲	⥳	⥴	⥵	⥶	⥷	⥸	⥹	⥺	⥻	⥼	⥽	⥾	⥿
Notes 1.As of Unicode version 18.0

=== Miscellaneous Symbols and Arrows block ===
The Miscellaneous Symbols and Arrows block (U+2B00–U+2BFF) contains arrows and geometric shapes with various fills.

The math subset of this block is U+2B30–U+2B44, U+2B47–U+2B4C.

Miscellaneous Symbols and Arrows^{[1]}^{[2]} Official Unicode Consortium code chart (PDF)
	0	1	2	3	4	5	6	7	8	9	A	B	C	D	E	F
U+2B0x	⬀	⬁	⬂	⬃	⬄	⬅	⬆	⬇	⬈	⬉	⬊	⬋	⬌	⬍	⬎	⬏
U+2B1x	⬐	⬑	⬒	⬓	⬔	⬕	⬖	⬗	⬘	⬙	⬚	⬛	⬜	⬝	⬞	⬟
U+2B2x	⬠	⬡	⬢	⬣	⬤	⬥	⬦	⬧	⬨	⬩	⬪	⬫	⬬	⬭	⬮	⬯
U+2B3x	⬰	⬱	⬲	⬳	⬴	⬵	⬶	⬷	⬸	⬹	⬺	⬻	⬼	⬽	⬾	⬿
U+2B4x	⭀	⭁	⭂	⭃	⭄	⭅	⭆	⭇	⭈	⭉	⭊	⭋	⭌	⭍	⭎	⭏
U+2B5x	⭐	⭑	⭒	⭓	⭔	⭕	⭖	⭗	⭘	⭙	⭚	⭛	⭜	⭝	⭞	⭟
U+2B6x	⭠	⭡	⭢	⭣	⭤	⭥	⭦	⭧	⭨	⭩	⭪	⭫	⭬	⭭	⭮	⭯
U+2B7x	⭰	⭱	⭲	⭳			⭶	⭷	⭸	⭹	⭺	⭻	⭼	⭽	⭾	⭿
U+2B8x	⮀	⮁	⮂	⮃	⮄	⮅	⮆	⮇	⮈	⮉	⮊	⮋	⮌	⮍	⮎	⮏
U+2B9x	⮐	⮑	⮒	⮓	⮔	⮕	⮖	⮗	⮘	⮙	⮚	⮛	⮜	⮝	⮞	⮟
U+2BAx	⮠	⮡	⮢	⮣	⮤	⮥	⮦	⮧	⮨	⮩	⮪	⮫	⮬	⮭	⮮	⮯
U+2BBx	⮰	⮱	⮲	⮳	⮴	⮵	⮶	⮷	⮸	⮹	⮺	⮻	⮼	⮽	⮾	⮿
U+2BCx	⯀	⯁	⯂	⯃	⯄	⯅	⯆	⯇	⯈	⯉	⯊	⯋	⯌	⯍	⯎	⯏
U+2BDx	⯐	⯑	⯒	⯓	⯔	⯕	⯖	⯗	⯘	⯙	⯚	⯛	⯜	⯝	⯞	⯟
U+2BEx	⯠	⯡	⯢	⯣	⯤	⯥	⯦	⯧	⯨	⯩	⯪	⯫	⯬	⯭	⯮	⯯
U+2BFx	⯰	⯱	⯲	⯳	⯴	⯵	⯶	⯷	⯸	⯹	⯺	⯻	⯼	⯽	⯾	⯿
Notes 1.As of Unicode version 18.0 2.Grey areas indicate non-assigned code points

=== Miscellaneous Symbols and Arrows Extended block ===
The Miscellaneous Symbols and Arrows block (U+1DB00–U+1DBFF) supports symbols used in the 17th century by G.W. Leibniz and other authors.

Miscellaneous Symbols and Arrows Extended^{[1]}^{[2]} Official Unicode Consortium code chart (PDF)
	0	1	2	3	4	5	6	7	8	9	A	B	C	D	E	F
U+1DB0x	𝬀	𝬁	𝬂	𝬃	𝬄	𝬅	𝬆	𝬇	𝬈	𝬉	𝬊	𝬋	𝬌	𝬍	𝬎	𝬏
U+1DB1x	𝬐	𝬑	𝬒	𝬓	𝬔	𝬕	𝬖	𝬗	𝬘	𝬙	𝬚	𝬛	𝬜			
U+1DB2x																
U+1DB3x																
U+1DB4x																
U+1DB5x																
U+1DB6x																
U+1DB7x																
U+1DB8x																
U+1DB9x																
U+1DBAx																
U+1DBBx																
U+1DBCx																
U+1DBDx																
U+1DBEx																
U+1DBFx																
Notes 1.As of Unicode version 18.0 2.Grey areas indicate non-assigned code points

=== Combining Diacritical Marks for Symbols block ===
The Combining Diacritical Marks for Symbols block contains arrows, dots, enclosures, and overlays for modifying symbol characters.

The math subset of this block is U+20D0–U+20DC, U+20E1, U+20E5–U+20E6, and U+20EB–U+20EF.

Combining Diacritical Marks for Symbols^{[1]}^{[2]} Official Unicode Consortium code chart (PDF)
	0	1	2	3	4	5	6	7	8	9	A	B	C	D	E	F
U+20Dx	◌⃐	◌⃑	◌⃒	◌⃓	◌⃔	◌⃕	◌⃖	◌⃗	◌⃘	◌⃙	◌⃚	◌⃛	◌⃜	◌⃝	◌⃞	◌⃟
U+20Ex	◌⃠	◌⃡	◌⃢	◌⃣	◌⃤	◌⃥	◌⃦	◌⃧	◌⃨	◌⃩	◌⃪	◌⃫	◌⃬	◌⃭	◌⃮	◌⃯
U+20Fx	◌⃰															
Notes 1.As of Unicode version 18.0 2.Grey areas indicate non-assigned code points

=== Arabic Mathematical Alphabetic Symbols block ===
The Arabic Mathematical Alphabetic Symbols block (U+1EE00–U+1EEFF) contains characters used in Arabic mathematical expressions.

Arabic Mathematical Alphabetic Symbols^{[1]}^{[2]} Official Unicode Consortium code chart (PDF)
	0	1	2	3	4	5	6	7	8	9	A	B	C	D	E	F
U+1EE0x	𞸀	𞸁	𞸂	𞸃		𞸅	𞸆	𞸇	𞸈	𞸉	𞸊	𞸋	𞸌	𞸍	𞸎	𞸏
U+1EE1x	𞸐	𞸑	𞸒	𞸓	𞸔	𞸕	𞸖	𞸗	𞸘	𞸙	𞸚	𞸛	𞸜	𞸝	𞸞	𞸟
U+1EE2x		𞸡	𞸢		𞸤			𞸧		𞸩	𞸪	𞸫	𞸬	𞸭	𞸮	𞸯
U+1EE3x	𞸰	𞸱	𞸲		𞸴	𞸵	𞸶	𞸷		𞸹		𞸻				
U+1EE4x			𞹂					𞹇		𞹉		𞹋		𞹍	𞹎	𞹏
U+1EE5x		𞹑	𞹒		𞹔			𞹗		𞹙		𞹛		𞹝		𞹟
U+1EE6x		𞹡	𞹢		𞹤			𞹧	𞹨	𞹩	𞹪		𞹬	𞹭	𞹮	𞹯
U+1EE7x	𞹰	𞹱	𞹲		𞹴	𞹵	𞹶	𞹷		𞹹	𞹺	𞹻	𞹼		𞹾	
U+1EE8x	𞺀	𞺁	𞺂	𞺃	𞺄	𞺅	𞺆	𞺇	𞺈	𞺉		𞺋	𞺌	𞺍	𞺎	𞺏
U+1EE9x	𞺐	𞺑	𞺒	𞺓	𞺔	𞺕	𞺖	𞺗	𞺘	𞺙	𞺚	𞺛				
U+1EEAx		𞺡	𞺢	𞺣		𞺥	𞺦	𞺧	𞺨	𞺩		𞺫	𞺬	𞺭	𞺮	𞺯
U+1EEBx	𞺰	𞺱	𞺲	𞺳	𞺴	𞺵	𞺶	𞺷	𞺸	𞺹	𞺺	𞺻				
U+1EECx																
U+1EEDx																
U+1EEEx																
U+1EEFx	𞻰	𞻱														
Notes 1.As of Unicode version 18.0 2.Grey areas indicate non-assigned code points

== Characters in other blocks ==
Mathematical characters also appear in other blocks. Below is a list of these characters as of Unicode version 18.0:

- Basic Latin block

U+002B	+	PLUS SIGN
U+002D	-	HYPHEN-MINUS
U+003C	<	LESS-THAN SIGN
U+003D	=	EQUALS SIGN
U+003E	>	GREATER-THAN SIGN
U+005E	^	CIRCUMFLEX ACCENT
U+007C	|	VERTICAL LINE
U+007E	~	TILDE

- Latin-1 Supplement block

U+00AC	¬	NOT SIGN
U+00B0	°	DEGREE SIGN
U+00B1	±	PLUS-MINUS SIGN
U+00D7	×	MULTIPLICATION SIGN
U+00F7	÷	DIVISION SIGN

- Greek and Coptic block

U+03D0	ϐ	GREEK BETA SYMBOL
U+03D1	ϑ	GREEK THETA SYMBOL
U+03D2	ϒ	GREEK UPSILON WITH HOOK SYMBOL
U+03D5	ϕ	GREEK PHI SYMBOL
U+03F0	ϰ	GREEK KAPPA SYMBOL
U+03F1	ϱ	GREEK RHO SYMBOL
U+03F4	ϴ	GREEK CAPITAL THETA SYMBOL
U+03F5	ϵ	GREEK LUNATE EPSILON SYMBOL
U+03F6	϶	GREEK REVERSED LUNATE EPSILON SYMBOL

- Arabic block

U+0606	؆	ARABIC-INDIC CUBE ROOT
U+0607	؇	ARABIC-INDIC FOURTH ROOT
U+0608	؈	ARABIC RAY

- General Punctuation block

U+2016	‖	DOUBLE VERTICAL LINE
U+2032	′	PRIME
U+2033	″	DOUBLE PRIME
U+2034	‴	TRIPLE PRIME
U+2040	⁀	CHARACTER TIE
U+2044	/	FRACTION SLASH
U+2052	⁒	COMMERCIAL MINUS SIGN
U+2061	note	FUNCTION APPLICATION
U+2062	note	INVISIBLE TIMES
U+2063	note	INVISIBLE SEPARATOR
U+2064	note	INVISIBLE PLUS

Note: non-marking character

- Superscripts and Subscripts block

U+207A	⁺	SUPERSCRIPT PLUS SIGN
U+207B	⁻	SUPERSCRIPT MINUS
U+207C	⁼	SUPERSCRIPT EQUALS SIGN
U+207D	⁽	SUPERSCRIPT LEFT PARENTHESIS
U+207E	⁾	SUPERSCRIPT RIGHT PARENTHESIS
U+208A	₊	SUBSCRIPT PLUS SIGN
U+208B	₋	SUBSCRIPT MINUS
U+208C	₌	SUBSCRIPT EQUALS SIGN
U+208D	₍	SUBSCRIPT LEFT PARENTHESIS
U+208E	₎	SUBSCRIPT RIGHT PARENTHESIS

- Miscellaneous Symbols block

U+2605	★	BLACK STAR
U+2606	☆	WHITE STAR
U+2640	♀	FEMALE SIGN
U+2642	♂	MALE SIGN
U+2660	♠	BLACK SPADE SUIT
U+2661	♡	WHITE HEART SUIT
U+2662	♢	WHITE DIAMOND SUIT
U+2663	♣	BLACK CLUB SUIT
U+266D	♭	MUSIC FLAT SIGN
U+266E	♮	MUSIC NATURAL SIGN
U+266F	♯	MUSIC SHARP SIGN

- Miscellaneous Symbols Supplement block

U+1CEDD	𜻝	SQUARE ROOT OF SQUARE ROOT
U+1CEDE	𜻞	SQUARE ROOT OF SQUARE ROOT OF SQUARE ROOT
U+1CEDF	𜻟	SQUARE ROOT OF SQUARE ROOT OF SQUARE ROOT OF SQUARE ROOT
U+1CEF0	𜻰	MEDIUM SMALL WHITE CIRCLE WITH HORIZONTAL BAR
U+1CEF1	𜻱	LEIBNIZIAN DIVISION SIGN
U+1CEF2	𜻲	LEIBNIZIAN MULTIPLICATION SIGN
U+1CEF3	𜻳	LEIBNIZIAN MULTIPLICATION-DIVISION SIGN
U+1CEF4	𜻴	LEIBNIZIAN FRACTION REDUCTION SIGN-1
U+1CEF5	𜻵	LEIBNIZIAN FRACTION REDUCTION SIGN-2
U+1CEF6	𜻶	SECTOR WITH CHORD
U+1CEF7	𜻷	SECTOR WITH DOUBLE ARC
U+1CEF8	𜻸	SECTOR WITH CHORD AND DOTTED ARC
U+1CEF9	𜻹	MEASURED ANGLE WITH DOUBLE ARC
U+1CEFA	𜻺	MEASURED ANGLE WITH CONCAVE ARC
U+1CEFB	𜻻	MEASURED ANGLE WITH DOUBLE CONCAVE ARC
U+1CEFC	𜻼	ANGLE OPENING UP
U+1CEFD	𜻽	HYPERBOLA

- Geometric Shapes Extended block

U+1F7DB	🟛	BULLET IN DOUBLE CIRCLE
U+1F7F1	🟱	CIRCLE WITH DOUBLE VERTICAL AND HORIZONTAL LINE
U+1F7F2	🟲	DOUBLE CIRCLE WITH DOUBLE HORIZONTAL LINE
U+1F7F3	🟳	CIRCLED BOTTOM RIGHT OBLIQUE HALF BLACK CIRCLE
U+1F7F4	🟴	LEFT HALF WHITE CIRCLE
U+1F7F5	🟵	RIGHT HALF WHITE CIRCLE
U+1F7F6	🟶	TRANSPARENT CUBE
U+1F7F7	🟷	WHITE CUBE
U+1F7F8	🟸	HORIZONTAL DOUBLE WHITE SMALL SQUARE
U+1F7F9	🟹	VERTICAL DOUBLE WHITE SMALL SQUARE
U+1F7FA	🟺	WHITE SQUARE WITH BOTTOM HALF BISECTED
U+1F7FB	🟻	WHITE SQUARE WITH TOP HALF BISECTED
U+1F7FC	🟼	WHITE SQUARE WITH HORIZONTAL AND VERTICAL BISECTING LINES
U+1F7FD	🟽	LOWER LEFT FLATTENED RIGHT TRIANGLE
U+1F7FE	🟾	LOWER RIGHT FLATTENED RIGHT TRIANGLE
U+1F7FF	🟿	RHOMBUS

- Supplemental Arrows-C block

U+1F8D0	🣐	LONG RIGHTWARDS ARROW OVER LONG LEFTWARDS ARROW
U+1F8D1	🣑	LONG RIGHTWARDS HARPOON OVER LONG LEFTWARDS HARPOON
U+1F8D2	🣒	LONG RIGHTWARDS HARPOON ABOVE SHORT LEFTWARDS HARPOON
U+1F8D3	🣓	SHORT RIGHTWARDS HARPOON ABOVE LONG LEFTWARDS HARPOON
U+1F8D4	🣔	LONG LEFTWARDS HARPOON ABOVE SHORT RIGHTWARDS HARPOON
U+1F8D5	🣕	SHORT LEFTWARDS HARPOON ABOVE LONG RIGHTWARDS HARPOON
U+1F8D6	🣖	LONG RIGHTWARDS ARROW THROUGH X
U+1F8D7	🣗	LONG RIGHTWARDS ARROW WITH DOUBLE SLASH
U+1F8D8	🣘	LONG LEFT RIGHT ARROW WITH DEPENDENT LOBE

- Alphabetic Presentation Forms block

U+FB29	﬩	HEBREW LETTER ALTERNATIVE PLUS SIGN

- Small Form Variants block

U+FE61	﹡	SMALL ASTERISK
U+FE62	﹢	SMALL PLUS SIGN
U+FE63	﹣	SMALL HYPHEN-MINUS
U+FE64	﹤	SMALL LESS-THAN SIGN
U+FE65	﹥	SMALL GREATER-THAN SIGN
U+FE66	﹦	SMALL EQUALS SIGN
U+FE68	﹨	SMALL REVERSE SOLIDUS

- Halfwidth and Fullwidth Forms block

U+FF0B	＋	FULLWIDTH PLUS SIGN
U+FF1C	＜	FULLWIDTH LESS-THAN SIGN
U+FF1D	＝	FULLWIDTH EQUALS SIGN
U+FF1E	＞	FULLWIDTH GREATER-THAN SIGN
U+FF3C	＼	FULLWIDTH REVERSE SOLIDUS
U+FF3E	＾	FULLWIDTH CIRCUMFLEX ACCENT
U+FF5C	｜	FULLWIDTH VERTICAL LINE
U+FF5E	～	FULLWIDTH TILDE
U+FFE2	￢	FULLWIDTH NOT SIGN
U+FFE9	￩	HALFWIDTH LEFTWARDS ARROW
U+FFEA	￪	HALFWIDTH UPWARDS ARROW
U+FFEB	￫	HALFWIDTH RIGHTWARDS ARROW
U+FFEC	￬	HALFWIDTH DOWNWARDS ARROW

- Garay block

U+10D8E	𐶎	GARAY PLUS SIGN
U+10D8F	𐶏	GARAY MINUS SIGN

== See also ==
- Glossary of mathematical symbols
- List of logic symbols
- Greek letters used in mathematics, science, and engineering
- List of letters used in mathematics and science
- List of mathematical uses of Latin letters
- Unicode subscripts and superscripts
- Unicode symbols
- CJK Compatibility Unicode symbols includes symbols for SI units
- Units for order of magnitude shows position of SI units
