= Mathematical Operators (Unicode block) =

- Range: U+2200..U+22FF (256 code points)
- Plane: BMP
- Scripts: Common
- Symbol sets: Mathematical symbols Logic and Set operators Relation symbols
- Assigned: 256 code points
- Unused: 0 reserved code points

Unicode Version History
- 1.0.0 (1991): 242 (+242)
- 3.2 (2002): 256 (+14)

Unicode documentation
- Code chart ∣ Web page

Mathematical Operators is a Unicode block containing characters for mathematical, logical, and set notation.

Notably absent are the plus sign ($+$), greater than sign ($>$), equals sign ($=$), and less than sign ($<$), due to them already appearing in the Basic Latin Unicode block, and the plus-or-minus sign ($\pm$), multiplication sign ($\times$) and division sign ($\div$), due to them already appearing in the Latin-1 Supplement block, although a distinct minus sign ($-$) is included, semantically different from the Basic Latin hyphen-minus (-).

== Block ==
Mathematical Operators^{[1]} Official Unicode Consortium code chart (PDF)
	0	1	2	3	4	5	6	7	8	9	A	B	C	D	E	F
U+220x	∀	∁	∂	∃	∄	∅	∆	∇	∈	∉	∊	∋	∌	∍	∎	∏
U+221x	∐	∑	−	∓	∔	∕	∖	∗	∘	∙	√	∛	∜	∝	∞	∟
U+222x	∠	∡	∢	∣	∤	∥	∦	∧	∨	∩	∪	∫	∬	∭	∮	∯
U+223x	∰	∱	∲	∳	∴	∵	∶	∷	∸	∹	∺	∻	∼	∽	∾	∿
U+224x	≀	≁	≂	≃	≄	≅	≆	≇	≈	≉	≊	≋	≌	≍	≎	≏
U+225x	≐	≑	≒	≓	≔	≕	≖	≗	≘	≙	≚	≛	≜	≝	≞	≟
U+226x	≠	≡	≢	≣	≤	≥	≦	≧	≨	≩	≪	≫	≬	≭	≮	≯
U+227x	≰	≱	≲	≳	≴	≵	≶	≷	≸	≹	≺	≻	≼	≽	≾	≿
U+228x	⊀	⊁	⊂	⊃	⊄	⊅	⊆	⊇	⊈	⊉	⊊	⊋	⊌	⊍	⊎	⊏
U+229x	⊐	⊑	⊒	⊓	⊔	⊕	⊖	⊗	⊘	⊙	⊚	⊛	⊜	⊝	⊞	⊟
U+22Ax	⊠	⊡	⊢	⊣	⊤	⊥	⊦	⊧	⊨	⊩	⊪	⊫	⊬	⊭	⊮	⊯
U+22Bx	⊰	⊱	⊲	⊳	⊴	⊵	⊶	⊷	⊸	⊹	⊺	⊻	⊼	⊽	⊾	⊿
U+22Cx	⋀	⋁	⋂	⋃	⋄	⋅	⋆	⋇	⋈	⋉	⋊	⋋	⋌	⋍	⋎	⋏
U+22Dx	⋐	⋑	⋒	⋓	⋔	⋕	⋖	⋗	⋘	⋙	⋚	⋛	⋜	⋝	⋞	⋟
U+22Ex	⋠	⋡	⋢	⋣	⋤	⋥	⋦	⋧	⋨	⋩	⋪	⋫	⋬	⋭	⋮	⋯
U+22Fx	⋰	⋱	⋲	⋳	⋴	⋵	⋶	⋷	⋸	⋹	⋺	⋻	⋼	⋽	⋾	⋿
Notes 1.As of Unicode version 18.0

== Variation sequences ==
The Mathematical Operators block has dozens of variation sequences defined for standardized variants. They use U+FE00 VARIATION SELECTOR-1 (VS01) to denote variant symbols (depending on the font):

Variation sequences
Base character	Base	+VS01	Description
U+2205 EMPTY SET	∅	∅︀	zero with long diagonal stroke overlay form
U+2229 INTERSECTION	∩	∩︀	with serifs
U+222A UNION	∪	∪︀	with serifs
U+2268 LESS-THAN BUT NOT EQUAL TO	≨	≨︀	with vertical stroke
U+2269 GREATER-THAN BUT NOT EQUAL TO	≩	≩︀	with vertical stroke
U+2272 LESS-THAN OR EQUIVALENT TO	≲	≲︀	following the slant of the lower leg
U+2273 GREATER-THAN OR EQUIVALENT TO	≳	≳︀	following the slant of the lower leg
U+228A SUBSET OF WITH NOT EQUAL TO	⊊	⊊︀	with stroke through bottom members
U+228B SUPERSET OF WITH NOT EQUAL TO	⊋	⊋︀	with stroke through bottom members
U+2293 SQUARE CAP	⊓	⊓︀	with serifs
U+2294 SQUARE CUP	⊔	⊔︀	with serifs
U+2295 CIRCLED PLUS	⊕	⊕︀	with white rim
U+2297 CIRCLED TIMES	⊗	⊗︀	with white rim
U+229C CIRCLED EQUALS	⊜	⊜︀	with equal sign touching the circle
U+22DA LESS-THAN EQUAL TO OR GREATER-THAN	⋚	⋚︀	with slanted equal
U+22DB GREATER-THAN EQUAL TO OR LESS-THAN	⋛	⋛︀	with slanted equal
U+223D REVERSED TILDE	∽	∽︀	using lazy S
U+2243 ASYMPTOTICALLY EQUAL TO	≃	≃︀	using lazy S
U+22CD REVERSED TILDE EQUALS	⋍	⋍︀	using lazy S
U+2242 MINUS TILDE	≂	≂︀	using lazy S
U+2248 ALMOST EQUAL TO	≈	≈︀	using lazy S
U+22DC EQUAL TO OR LESS-THAN	⋜	⋜︀	with horizontal equal
U+22DD EQUAL TO OR GREATER-THAN	⋝	⋝︀	with horizontal equal

== History ==
The following Unicode-related documents record the purpose and process of defining specific characters in the Mathematical Operators block:

Version	Final code points (Note: Proposed code points and characters names may differ from final code points and names)	Count	UTC ID	L2 ID	WG2 ID	Document
1.0.0	U+2200..22F1	242				(to be determined)
1.0.0	U+2200..22F1	242	UTC/1999-013			Karlsson, Kent (1999-05-27), Tildes and micro sign decompositions
1.0.0	U+2200..22F1	242		L2/99-176R		Moore, Lisa (1999-11-04), "Not Tilde", Minutes from the joint UTC/L2 meeting in Seattle, June 8-10, 1999
1.0.0	U+2200..22F1	242		L2/00-115R2		Moore, Lisa (2000-08-08), "Motion 83-M21", Minutes Of UTC Meeting #83
1.0.0	U+2200..22F1	242		L2/01-342		Suignard, Michel (2001-09-10), "T.9 B.1 List of combining characters/Variation selectors", Comments accompanying the US positive vote on the FPDAM 1 to ISO/IEC 10646-1:2001
1.0.0	U+2200..22F1	242		L2/07-268	N3253 (pdf, doc)	Umamaheswaran, V. S. (2007-07-26), "M50.7 (Math symbol glyph correction) [U+22C4]", Unconfirmed minutes of WG 2 meeting 50, Frankfurt-am-Main, Germany; 2007-04-24/27
1.0.0	U+2200..22F1	242		L2/15-268		Beeton, Barbara; Freytag, Asmus; Iancu, Laurențiu; Sargent, Murray (2015-10-30), Proposal to Represent the Slashed Zero Variant of Empty Set
1.0.0	U+2200..22F1	242		L2/15-254		Moore, Lisa (2015-11-16), "B.12.1.2 Proposal to Represent the Slashed Zero Variant of Empty Set", UTC #145 Minutes
1.0.0	U+2200..22F1	242		L2/24-173		Pentzlin, Karl (2024-06-06), Proposal to encode a Middle Asterisk as referred to in the German standard DIN 2137 [Affects U+2217]
1.0.0	U+2200..22F1	242		L2/24-166		Anderson, Deborah; Goregaokar, Manish; Kučera, Jan; Whistler, Ken; Pournader, Roozbeh; Constable, Peter (2024-07-18), "20. Middle Asterisk [Affects U+2217]", Recommendations to UTC #180 July 2024 on Script Proposals
1.0.0	U+2200..22F1	242		L2/24-159		Constable, Peter (2024-07-29), "Section 20. Middle Asterisk", UTC #180 Minutes, "Consider adding an annotation to U+2217 that it may be used to represent the telephony asterisk"
1.0.0	U+2200..22F1	242			N5334R2	Mayer, Uwe; et al. (2026-01-19), Proposal to encode historical mathematical relations [Affects U+223D, 2243, 22CD, 2242, 2248, 2A6C, 22DC, and 22DD]
1.0.0	U+2200..22F1	242		L2/26-054R2		Anderson, Debbie; Constable, Peter (2026-01-22), "[Affects U+223D, 2243, 22CD, 2242, 2248, 2A6C, 22DC, and 22DD]", Proposed Leibniz additions for Unicode 18.0, "UTC accepts [...] variation sequences for glyph variants of historical mathematical relation characters"
1.0.0	U+2200..22F1	242		L2/26-003		"Consensus 186-C34 [Affects U+223D, 2243, 22CD, 2242, 2248, 2A6C, 22DC, and 22DD]", UTC #186 Minutes, 2026-02-01, "UTC accepts [...] variation sequences for glyph variants of historical mathematical relation characters"
3.2	U+22F2..22FF	14		L2/00-119 (Note: Refer to the history section of the Miscellaneous Mathematical Symbols-B block for additional math-related documents)	N2191R	Whistler, Ken; Freytag, Asmus (2000-04-19), Encoding Additional Mathematical Symbols in Unicode
3.2	U+22F2..22FF	14		L2/00-234	N2203 (rtf, txt)	Umamaheswaran, V. S. (2000-07-21), "8.18", Minutes from the SC2/WG2 meeting in Beijing, 2000-03-21 -- 24
3.2	U+22F2..22FF	14		L2/00-115R2		Moore, Lisa (2000-08-08), "Motion 83-M11", Minutes Of UTC Meeting #83

== See also ==
- Mathematical operators and symbols in Unicode
- Supplemental Mathematical Operators
