= ISO 6862 =

Character set for mathematics

ISO 6862 is an International Standard and a character set developed by ISO.

== Character set ==
ISO 6862
| | 0 | 1 | 2 | 3 | 4 | 5 | 6 | 7 | 8 | 9 | A | B | C | D | E | F |
| 0x | | | | | | | | | | | | | | | | |
| 1x | | | | | | | | | | | | | | | | |
| 2x | SP | ◌̸ 0338 | ⃒ 20D2 | ⃓ 20D3 | ◌̶ 0336 | ⃘ 20D8 | ⃚ 20DA | ⃙ 20D9 | ⃔ 20D4 | ◌̇ 0307 | ◌̈ 0308 | ◌⃖ 20D6 | ◌̂ 0302 | ◌̌ 030C | ◌⃗ 20D7 | ⃕ 20D5 |
| 3x | × 00D7 | ± 00B1 | ∼ 223C | ≈ 2248 | ≡ 2261 | ≤ 2264 | ≶ 2276 | ≲ 2272 | ≪ 226A | ∥ 2225 | ∟ 221F | ∅ 2205 | ° 00B0 | ⟨ 27E8 | 〚 301A | ∑ 2211 |
| 4x | ÷ 00F7 | ∓ 2213 | ≃ 2243 | ≅ 2245 | ≏ 224F | ≥ 2265 | ≷ 2277 | ≳ 2273 | ≫ 226B | ⊥ 22A5 | ∠ 2220 | ∇ 2207 | ‰ 2030 | ⟩ 27E9 | 〛 301B | ∏ 220F |
| 5x | + 002B | ⊂ 2282 | ⊆ 2286 | ∈ 2208 | ⋃ 22C3 | ∀ 2200 | ∁ 2201 | ↑ 2191 | ← 2190 | ↶ 21B6 | ↔ 2194 | ⇆ 21C6 | ↦ 21A6 | ⇑ 21D1 | ⇐ 21D0 | ∞ 221E |
| 6x | − 2212 | ⊃ 2283 | ⊇ 2287 | ∋ 220B | ⋂ 22C2 | ∃ 2203 | ∅ 2205 | ↓ 2193 | → 2192 | ↷ 21B7 | ↕ 2195 | ⇄ 21C4 | ⇅ 21C5 | ⇓ 21D3 | ⇒ 21D2 | √ 221A |
| 7x | ′ 2032 | ″ 2033 | ‴ 2034 | ∨ 2228 | ∧ 2227 | ¬ 00AC | ℎ 210E | ⊢ 22A2 | ∫ 222B | ∬ 222C | ∭ 222D | ∂ 2202 | ℏ 210F | ℵ 2135 | ∘ 2218 | |
| 8x | | | | | | | | | | | | | | | | |
| 9x | | | | | | | | | | | | | | | | |
| Ax | | ⊕ 2295 | ⊖ 2296 | ⊗ 2297 | ⊙ 2299 | ∴ 2234 | ∵ 2235 | ⊏ 228F | ⊐ 2290 | ⊷ 22B7 | ⊶ 22B6 | ⊹ 22B9 | ∔ 2214 | ∾ 223E | ∻ 223B | ⊰ 22B0 |
| Bx | ≠ 2260 | ≓ 2253 | 〘 3018 | ⌊ 230A | ⋮ 22EE | ⌈ 2308 | ⊑ 2291 | ⊔ 2294 | ⊲ 22B2 | ≾ 227E | ≺ 227A | ≼ 227C | ∸ 2238 | ≙ 2259 | ◁ 25C1 | △ 25B3 |
| Cx | ≊ 224A | ∷ 2237 | 〙 3019 | ⌋ 230B | ≎ 224E | ⌉ 2309 | ⊒ 2292 | ⊓ 2293 | ⊴ 22B4 | ≿ 227F | ≻ 227B | ≽ 227D | ≐ 2250 | ≚ 225A | ▽ 25BD | ▷ 25B7 |
| Dx | ‖ 2016 | ╱ 2571 | ⊤ 22A4 | ⋁ 22C1 | ∪ 222A | ⊂ 2282 | ∊ 220A | ↖ 2196 | ↙ 2199 | ↾ 21BE | ↛ 219B | ↪ 21AA | ○ 25CB | □ 25A1 | ▭ 25AD | ◊ 25CA |
| Ex | | 007C | ╲ 2572 | ∖ 2216 | ⋀ 22C0 | ∩ 2229 | ⊃ 2283 | ∍ 220D | ↗ 2197 | ↘ 2198 | ⇝ 21DD | ↠ 21A0 | ↩ 21A9 | ● 25CF | ■ 25A0 | ▱ 25B1 | ∢ 2222 |
| Fx | ≒ 2252 | ∺ 223A | ∝ 221D | ⌇ 2307 | ⊧ 22A7 | ⊦ 22A6 | ∦ 2226 | ∤ 2224 | ↚ 219A | ⇜ 21DC | ⇔ 21D4 | ⇕ 21D5 | ℩ 2129 | ℘ 2118 | ℞ 211E | |
