= Supplemental Mathematical Operators =

- Range: U+2A00..U+2AFF (256 code points)
- Plane: BMP
- Scripts: Common
- Assigned: 256 code points
- Unused: 0 reserved code points

Unicode Version History
- 3.2 (2002): 256 (+256)

Unicode documentation
- Code chart ∣ Web page

Supplemental Mathematical Operators is a Unicode block containing various mathematical symbols, including N-ary operators, summations and integrals, intersections and unions, logical and relational operators, and subset/superset relations.

== Block ==
Supplemental Mathematical Operators^{[1]} Official Unicode Consortium code chart (PDF)
	0	1	2	3	4	5	6	7	8	9	A	B	C	D	E	F
U+2A0x	⨀	⨁	⨂	⨃	⨄	⨅	⨆	⨇	⨈	⨉	⨊	⨋	⨌	⨍	⨎	⨏
U+2A1x	⨐	⨑	⨒	⨓	⨔	⨕	⨖	⨗	⨘	⨙	⨚	⨛	⨜	⨝	⨞	⨟
U+2A2x	⨠	⨡	⨢	⨣	⨤	⨥	⨦	⨧	⨨	⨩	⨪	⨫	⨬	⨭	⨮	⨯
U+2A3x	⨰	⨱	⨲	⨳	⨴	⨵	⨶	⨷	⨸	⨹	⨺	⨻	⨼	⨽	⨾	⨿
U+2A4x	⩀	⩁	⩂	⩃	⩄	⩅	⩆	⩇	⩈	⩉	⩊	⩋	⩌	⩍	⩎	⩏
U+2A5x	⩐	⩑	⩒	⩓	⩔	⩕	⩖	⩗	⩘	⩙	⩚	⩛	⩜	⩝	⩞	⩟
U+2A6x	⩠	⩡	⩢	⩣	⩤	⩥	⩦	⩧	⩨	⩩	⩪	⩫	⩬	⩭	⩮	⩯
U+2A7x	⩰	⩱	⩲	⩳	⩴	⩵	⩶	⩷	⩸	⩹	⩺	⩻	⩼	⩽	⩾	⩿
U+2A8x	⪀	⪁	⪂	⪃	⪄	⪅	⪆	⪇	⪈	⪉	⪊	⪋	⪌	⪍	⪎	⪏
U+2A9x	⪐	⪑	⪒	⪓	⪔	⪕	⪖	⪗	⪘	⪙	⪚	⪛	⪜	⪝	⪞	⪟
U+2AAx	⪠	⪡	⪢	⪣	⪤	⪥	⪦	⪧	⪨	⪩	⪪	⪫	⪬	⪭	⪮	⪯
U+2ABx	⪰	⪱	⪲	⪳	⪴	⪵	⪶	⪷	⪸	⪹	⪺	⪻	⪼	⪽	⪾	⪿
U+2ACx	⫀	⫁	⫂	⫃	⫄	⫅	⫆	⫇	⫈	⫉	⫊	⫋	⫌	⫍	⫎	⫏
U+2ADx	⫐	⫑	⫒	⫓	⫔	⫕	⫖	⫗	⫘	⫙	⫚	⫛	⫝̸	⫝	⫞	⫟
U+2AEx	⫠	⫡	⫢	⫣	⫤	⫥	⫦	⫧	⫨	⫩	⫪	⫫	⫬	⫭	⫮	⫯
U+2AFx	⫰	⫱	⫲	⫳	⫴	⫵	⫶	⫷	⫸	⫹	⫺	⫻	⫼	⫽	⫾	⫿
Notes 1.As of Unicode version 17.0

== Variation sequences ==
The Supplemental Mathematical Operators block has nine variation sequences defined for standardized variants. They use U+FE00 VARIATION SELECTOR-1 (VS01) to denote variant symbols (depending on the font):

Variation sequences
Base character	Base	+VS01	Description
U+2A3C INTERIOR PRODUCT	⨼	⨼︀	tall variant with narrow foot
U+2A3D RIGHTHAND INTERIOR PRODUCT	⨽	⨽︀	tall variant with narrow foot
U+2A6C SIMILAR MINUS SIMILAR	⩬	⩬︀	using lazy S
U+2A9D SIMILAR OR LESS-THAN	⪝	⪝︀	with similar following the slant of the upper leg
U+2A9E SIMILAR OR GREATER-THAN	⪞	⪞︀	with similar following the slant of the upper leg
U+2AAC SMALLER THAN OR EQUAL TO	⪬	⪬︀	with slanted equal
U+2AAD LARGER THAN OR EQUAL TO	⪭	⪭︀	with slanted equal
U+2ACB SUBSET OF ABOVE NOT EQUAL TO	⫋	⫋︀	with stroke through bottom members
U+2ACC SUPERSET OF ABOVE NOT EQUAL TO	⫌	⫌︀	with stroke through bottom members

== History ==
The following Unicode-related documents record the purpose and process of defining specific characters in the Supplemental Mathematical Operators block:

Version	Final code points (Note: Proposed code points and characters names may differ from final code points and names)	Count	L2 ID	WG2 ID	Document
3.2	U+2A00..2A6D, 2A6F..2AF6	246	L2/00-119 (Note: Refer to the history section of the Miscellaneous Mathematical Symbols-B block for additional math-related documents)	N2191R	Whistler, Ken; Freytag, Asmus (2000-04-19), Encoding Additional Mathematical Symbols in Unicode
3.2	U+2A00..2A6D, 2A6F..2AF6	246	L2/00-234	N2203 (rtf, txt)	Umamaheswaran, V. S. (2000-07-21), "8.18", Minutes from the SC2/WG2 meeting in Beijing, 2000-03-21 -- 24
3.2	U+2A00..2A6D, 2A6F..2AF6	246	L2/00-115R2		Moore, Lisa (2000-08-08), "Motion 83-M11", Minutes Of UTC Meeting #83
3.2	U+2A00..2A6D, 2A6F..2AF6	246	L2/01-012R		Moore, Lisa (2001-05-21), "Motion 86-M19", Minutes UTC #86 in Mountain View, Jan 2001
3.2	U+2A00..2A6D, 2A6F..2AF6	246	L2/01-342		Suignard, Michel (2001-09-10), "T.9 B.1 List of combining characters/Variation selectors", Comments accompanying the US positive vote on the FPDAM 1 to ISO/IEC 10646-1:2001
3.2	U+2A6E, 2AF7..2AFF	10	L2/01-142	N2336	Beeton, Barbara; Freytag, Asmus; Ion, Patrick (2001-04-02), Additional Mathematical Symbols
3.2	U+2A6E, 2AF7..2AFF	10	L2/01-156	N2356	Freytag, Asmus (2001-04-03), Additional Mathematical Characters (Draft 10)
3.2	U+2A6E, 2AF7..2AFF	10	L2/01-344	N2353 (pdf, doc)	Umamaheswaran, V. S. (2001-09-09), "7.7 Mathematical Symbols", Minutes from SC2/WG2 meeting #40 -- Mountain View, April 2001

== See also ==
- Mathematical operators and symbols in Unicode
