= Start symbol =

Start symbol may refer to:

- Start symbol (formal languages), the symbol in formal grammar from which rewriting of a string begins
- _start symbol specifying an entry point in some formats of computer executables
- ▶️, a symbol used in media controls to start playing the media
- Start of Heading or Start of Text symbols in C0 and C1 control codes

== See also ==
- Start button in Microsoft Windows
