= Mathematical operators =

Mathematical operator can refer to:

- Operator (mathematics), a concept in mapping vector spaces
- Operation (mathematics), the basic symbols for addition, multiplication etc.
- Mathematical Operators (Unicode block), containing characters for mathematical, logical, and set notation
