= Ordered set operators =

Operators to indicate precedence order

In mathematical notation, ordered set operators indicate whether an object precedes or succeeds another. These relationship operators are denoted by the unicode symbols U+227A-F, along with symbols located unicode blocks U+228x through U+22Ex.

Mathematical Operators^{[1]} Official Unicode Consortium code chart (PDF)
	0	1	2	3	4	5	6	7	8	9	A	B	C	D	E	F
U+227x	≰	≱	≲	≳	≴	≵	≶	≷	≸	≹	≺	≻	≼	≽	≾	≿
U+228x	⊀	⊁	⊂	⊃	⊄	⊅	⊆	⊇	⊈	⊉	⊊	⊋	⊌	⊍	⊎	⊏
U+22Bx	⊰	⊱	⊲	⊳	⊴	⊵	⊶	⊷	⊸	⊹	⊺	⊻	⊼	⊽	⊾	⊿
U+22Dx	⋐	⋑	⋒	⋓	⋔	⋕	⋖	⋗	⋘	⋙	⋚	⋛	⋜	⋝	⋞	⋟
U+22Ex	⋠	⋡	⋢	⋣	⋤	⋥	⋦	⋧	⋨	⋩	⋪	⋫	⋬	⋭	⋮	⋯
Notes 1.As of Unicode version 7.0

== Examples ==
- The relationship x precedes y is written x ≺ y. The relation x precedes or is equal to y is written x ≼ y.
- The relationship x succeeds (or follows) y is written x ≻ y. The relation x succeeds or is equal to y is written x ≽ y.

== Use in political science ==
In political science and decision theory, order relations are typically used in the context of an agent's choice, for example the preferences of a voter over several political candidates.

- x ≺ y means that the voter prefers candidate y over candidate x.
- x ~ y means the voter is indifferent between candidates x and y.
- x ≲ y means the voter is indifferent or prefers candidate y.

== See also ==
- Glossary of mathematical symbols
- Order theory
- Partially ordered set
- Directional symbols
- Polynomial-time reduction
