= ≡ =

The symbol ≡ (triple bar, U+2261 ≡ IDENTICAL TO) is used in science and mathematics with several different meanings. It may refer to the following:

== Mathematics ==
- Definition: Identity of a variable and a mathematical expression because of the definition of the variable
- Logical biconditional, in logic (if and only if)
- Modular arithmetic, a ≡ b (mod m)
- General equivalence relation, often denoted using a triple bar

== Chemistry ==
- Triple bond, a type of covalent bond between two atoms

== Computing ==
- Hamburger button, often used for drop-down menus
- Symbol for the line feed character in ISO 2047

== See also ==
- U+11054 𑁔 BRAHMI NUMBER THREE
- U+2630 ☰ TRIGRAM FOR HEAVEN
- ≅, a symbol sometimes used to show an approximate value,

≅ a symbol sometimes used to show geometric congruence

- Ξ, capital letter Xi of the Greek alphabet
- 三, Chinese numeral for the number 3
- Glossary of mathematical symbols
- Tesla Model 3, whose logo originally stylized the digit 3 as three horizontal bars
- III (disambiguation), three letter Is in a row
