= Restriction (mathematics) =

Function with a smaller domain

The function $x^2$ with domain $\mathbb{R}$ does not have an inverse function. If we restrict $x^2$ to the non-negative real numbers, then it does have an inverse function, known as the square root of $x.$

In mathematics, the restriction of a function $f$ is a new function, denoted $f\vert_A$ or $f {\restriction_A},$ obtained by choosing a smaller domain $A$ for the original function $f.$ The function $f$ is then said to extend $f\vert_A.$

== Formal definition ==
Let $f : E \to F$ be a function from a set $E$ to a set $F.$ If a set $A$ is a subset of $E,$ then the restriction of $f$ to $A$ is the function
$${f|}_A : A \to F$$
given by ${f|}_A(x) = f(x)$ for $x \in A.$ Informally, the restriction of $f$ to $A$ is the same function as $f,$ but is only defined on $A$.

If the function $f$ is thought of as a relation $(x,f(x))$ on the Cartesian product $E \times F,$ then the restriction of $f$ to $A$ can be represented by its graph,

$$G({f|}_A) = \{ (x,f(x))\in G(f) : x\in A \} = G(f)\cap (A\times F),$$

where the pairs $(x,f(x))$ represent ordered pairs in the graph $G.$

=== Extensions ===
A function $F$ is said to be an extension of another function $f$ if whenever $x$ is in the domain of $f$ then $x$ is also in the domain of $F$ and $f(x) = F(x).$ That is, if $\operatorname{domain} f \subseteq \operatorname{domain} F$ and $F\big\vert_{\operatorname{domain} f} = f.$

A linear extension (respectively, continuous extension, etc.) of a function $f$ is an extension of $f$ that is also a linear map (respectively, a continuous map, etc.).

== Examples ==
1. The restriction of the non-injective function$f: \mathbb{R} \to \mathbb{R}, \ x \mapsto x^2$ to the domain $\mathbb{R}_{+} = [0,\infty)$ is the injection$f:\mathbb{R}_+ \to \mathbb{R}, \ x \mapsto x^2.$
2. The factorial function is the restriction of the gamma function to the positive integers, with the argument shifted by one: ${\Gamma|}_{\mathbb{Z}^+}\!(n) = (n-1)!$

== Properties of restrictions ==
- Restricting a function $f:X\rightarrow Y$ to its entire domain $X$ gives back the original function, that is, $f|_X = f.$
- Restricting a function twice is the same as restricting it once, that is, if $A \subseteq B \subseteq \operatorname{dom} f,$ then $\left(f|_B\right)|_A = f|_A.$
- The restriction of the identity function on a set $X$ to a subset $A$ of $X$ is just the inclusion map from $A$ into $X.$
- The restriction of a continuous function is continuous.

== Applications ==
=== Inverse functions ===
For a function to have an inverse, it must be one-to-one. If a function $f$ is not one-to-one, it may be possible to define a partial inverse of $f$ by restricting the domain. For example, the function
$$f(x) = x^2$$
defined on the whole of $\R$ is not one-to-one since $x^2 = (-x)^2$ for any $x \in \R.$ However, the function becomes one-to-one if we restrict to the domain $\R_{\geq 0} = [0, \infty),$ in which case
$$f^{-1}(y) = \sqrt{y} .$$

(If we instead restrict to the domain $(-\infty, 0],$ then the inverse is the negative of the square root of $y.$) Alternatively, there is no need to restrict the domain if we allow the inverse to be a multivalued function.

=== Selection operators ===
In relational algebra, a selection (sometimes called a restriction to avoid confusion with SQL's use of SELECT) is a unary operation written as $\sigma_{a \theta b}(R)$ or $\sigma_{a \theta v}(R)$ where:

- $a$ and $b$ are attribute names,
- $\theta$ is a binary operation in the set $\{<, \leq, =, \neq, \geq, >\},$
- $v$ is a value constant,
- $R$ is a relation.

The selection $\sigma_{a \theta b}(R)$ selects all those tuples in $R$ for which $\theta$ holds between the $a$ and the $b$ attribute.

The selection $\sigma_{a \theta v}(R)$ selects all those tuples in $R$ for which $\theta$ holds between the $a$ attribute and the value $v.$

Thus, the selection operator restricts to a subset of the entire database.

=== The pasting lemma ===
The pasting lemma is a result in topology that relates the continuity of a function with the continuity of its restrictions to subsets.

Let $X,Y$ be two closed subsets (or two open subsets) of a topological space $A$ such that $A = X \cup Y,$ and let $B$ also be a topological space. If $f: A \to B$ is continuous when restricted to both $X$ and $Y,$ then $f$ is continuous.

This result allows one to take two continuous functions defined on closed (or open) subsets of a topological space and create a new one.

=== Sheaves ===
Sheaves provide a way of generalizing restrictions to objects besides functions.

In sheaf theory, one assigns an object $F(U)$ in a category to each open set $U$ of a topological space, and requires that the objects satisfy certain conditions. The most important condition is that there are restriction morphisms between every pair of objects associated to nested open sets; that is, if $V\subseteq U,$ then there is a morphism $\operatorname{res}_{V,U} : F(U) \to F(V)$ satisfying the following properties, which are designed to mimic the restriction of a function:

- For every open set $U$ of $X,$ the restriction morphism $\operatorname{res}_{U,U} : F(U) \to F(U)$ is the identity morphism on $F(U).$
- If we have three open sets $W \subseteq V \subseteq U,$ then the composite $\operatorname{res}_{W,V} \circ \operatorname{res}_{V,U} = \operatorname{res}_{W,U}.$
- (Locality) If $\left(U_i\right)$ is an open covering of an open set $U,$ and if $s, t \in F(U)$ are such that $s\big\vert_{U_i} = t\big\vert_{U_i}$ for each set $U_i$ of the covering, then $s = t$; and
- (Gluing) If $\left(U_i\right)$ is an open covering of an open set $U,$ and if for each $i$ a section $x_i \in F\left(U_i\right)$ is given such that for each pair $U_i, U_j$ of the covering sets the restrictions of $s_i$ and $s_j$ agree on the overlaps: $s_i\big\vert_{U_i \cap U_j} = s_j\big\vert_{U_i \cap U_j},$ then there is a section $s \in F(U)$ such that $s\big\vert_{U_i} = s_i$ for each $i.$

The collection of all such objects is called a sheaf. If only the first two properties are satisfied, it is a pre-sheaf.

== Left- and right-restriction ==
More generally, the restriction (or domain restriction or left-restriction) $A \triangleleft R$ of a binary relation $R$ between $E$ and $F$ may be defined as a relation having domain $A,$ codomain $F$ and graph $G(A \triangleleft R) = \{(x, y) \in F(R) : x \in A\}.$ Similarly, one can define a right-restriction or range restriction $R \triangleright B.$ Indeed, one could define a restriction to $n$-ary relations, as well as to subsets understood as relations, such as ones of the Cartesian product $E \times F$ for binary relations. These cases do not fit into the scheme of sheaves.

== Anti-restriction ==
The domain anti-restriction (or domain subtraction) of a function or binary relation $R$ (with domain $E$ and codomain $F$) by a set $A$ may be defined as $(E \setminus A) \triangleleft R$; it removes all elements of $A$ from the domain $E.$ It is sometimes denoted $A$ ⩤ $R.$ Similarly, the range anti-restriction (or range subtraction) of a function or binary relation $R$ by a set $B$ is defined as $R \triangleright (F \setminus B)$; it removes all elements of $B$ from the codomain $F.$ It is sometimes denoted $R$ ⩥ $B.$

== See also ==
- Constraint – Condition of an optimization problem which the solution must satisfy
- Deformation retract – Continuous, position-preserving mapping from a topological space into a subspace
- Local property
- Function (mathematics) § Restriction and extension
- Binary relation § Restriction
- Relational algebra § Selection (σ)
