= Equiangular =

Equiangular may refer to:

- Equiangular lines, a set of lines where every pair of lines makes the same angle
- Equiangular polygon, a polygon with equal angles
- Logarithmic spiral or equiangular spiral, a type of geometric spiral
- Unicode symbol U+225A ≚ EQUIANGULAR TO represents the equiangular relation
