= ≤ =

≤ may refer to:

- Inequality (mathematics), relation between values; a ≤ b means "a is less than or equal to b"
- Subgroup, a subset of a given group in group theory; H ≤ G is read as "H is a subgroup of G"
