= Media control symbols =

Symbols usually representing media playback controls

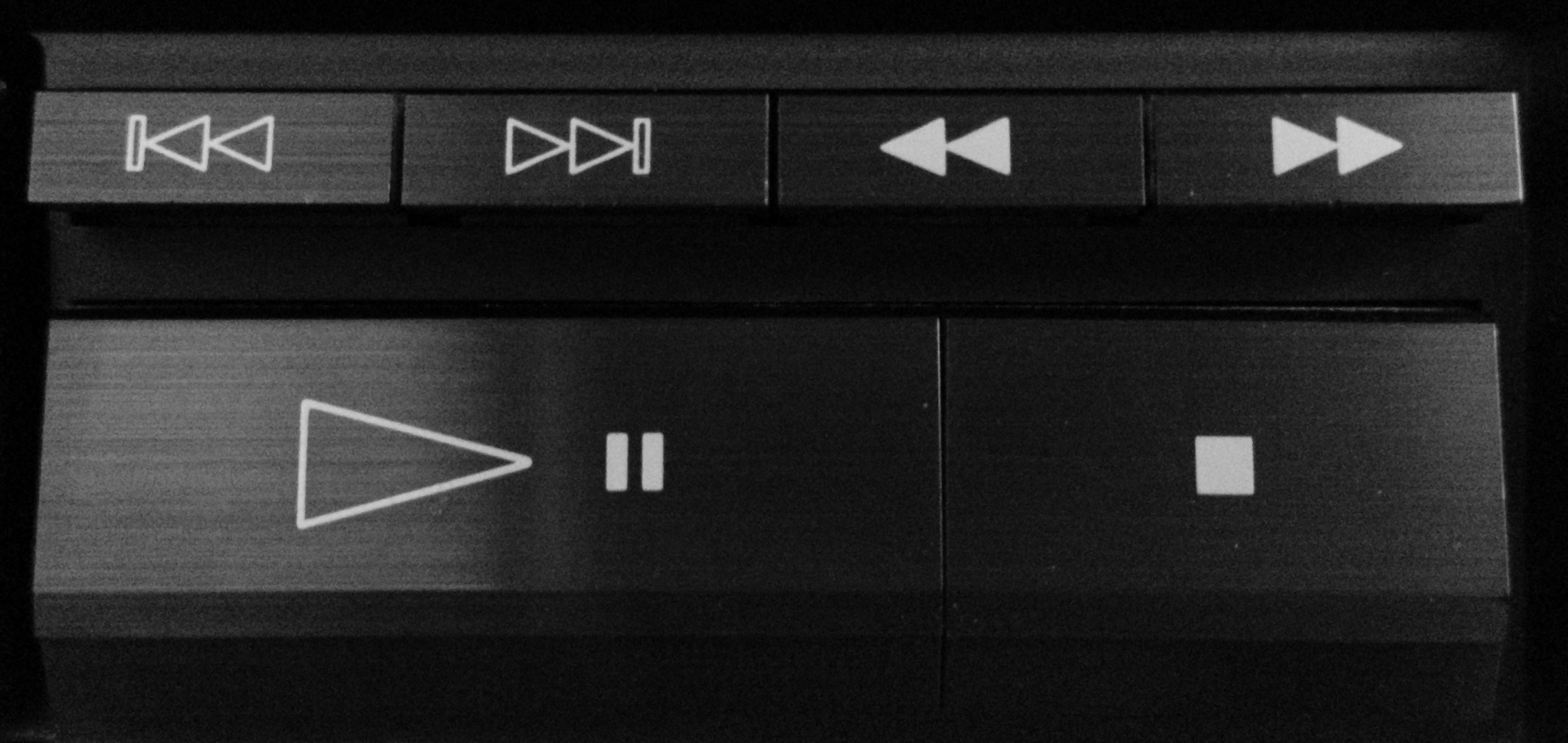
Playback controls on a CD player.

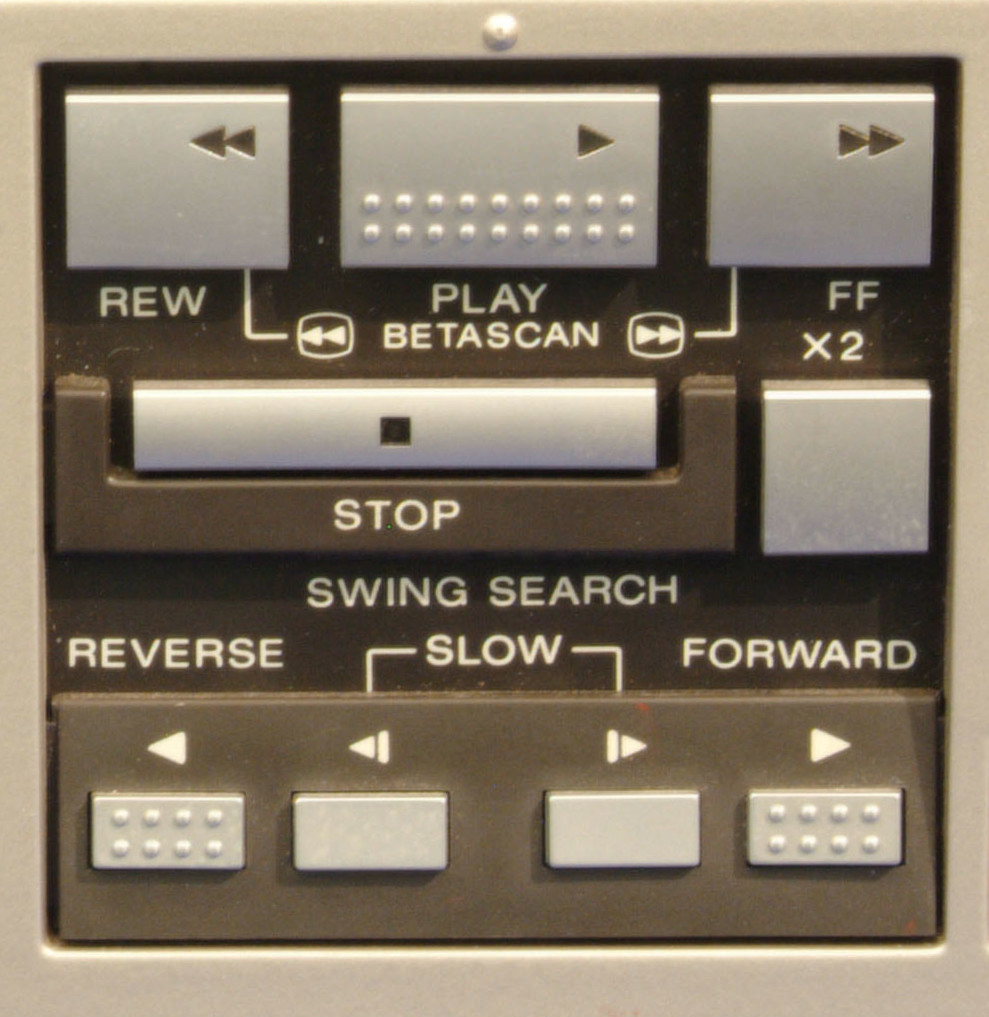
Control symbols on a Sony Betamax Portable.

In digital electronics, analogue electronics and entertainment, the user interface may include media controls, transport controls or player controls, to enact and change or adjust the process of video playback, audio playback, and alike. These controls are commonly depicted as widely known symbols found in a multitude of products, exemplifying what is known as dominant design.

== Symbols ==
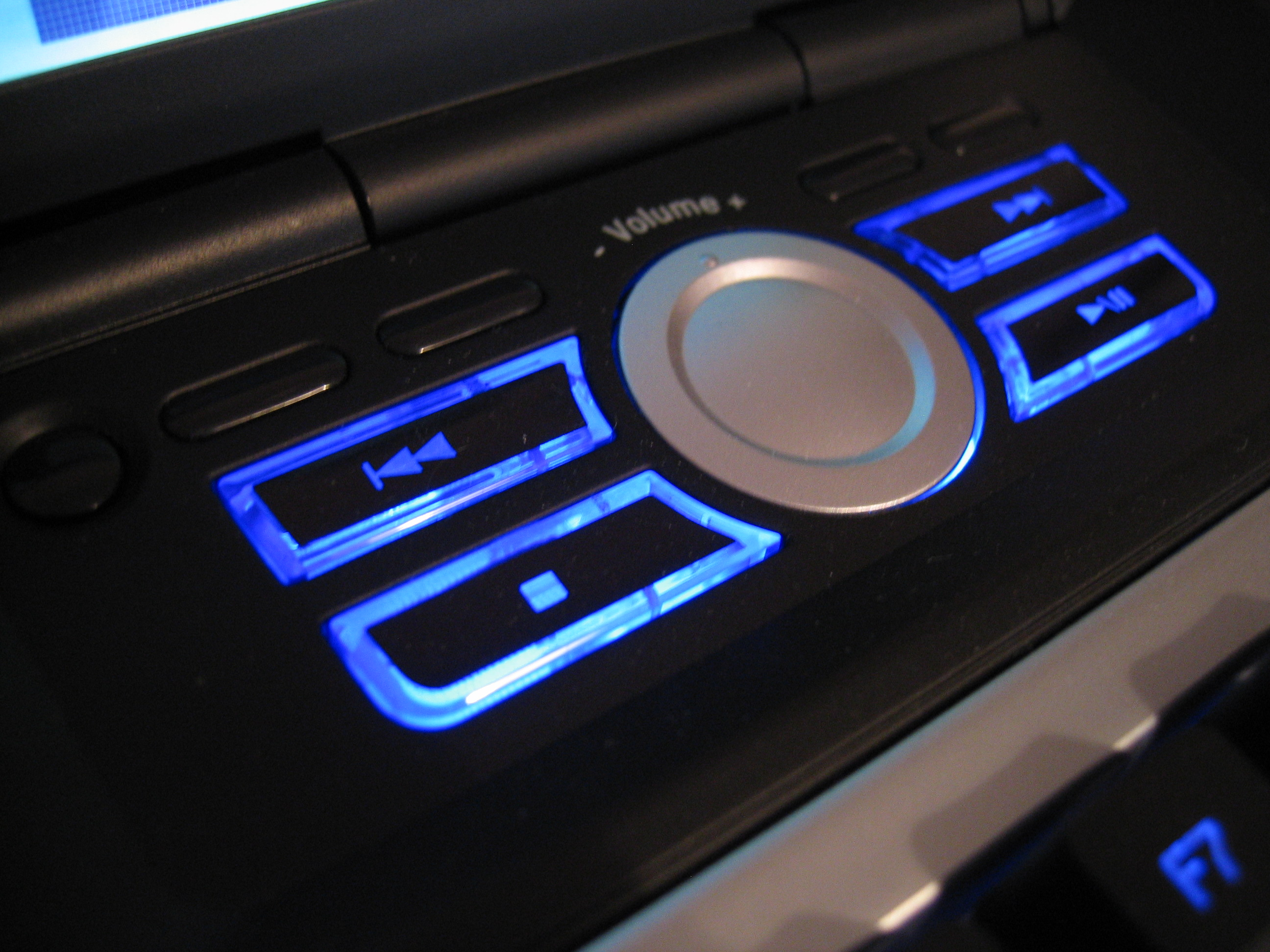
Media controls on a multimedia keyboard. From top; left to right: skip backward, skip forward, stop, play/pause.

Media control symbols are commonly found on both software and physical media players, remote controls, and multimedia keyboards. Their application is described in ISO/IEC 18035.

The main symbols date back to the 1960s, with the Pause symbol having reportedly been invented at Ampex during that decade for use on reel-to-reel audio recorder controls, due to the difficulty of translating the word "pause" into some languages used in foreign markets. The Pause symbol was designed as a combination of the existing square Stop symbol and the caesura, and was intended to evoke the concept of an interruption or "stutter stop". The right-pointing triangle was adopted to indicate the direction of tape movement during playback. This design choice was straightforward: the arrow pointed in the direction the tape advanced. Over time, this symbol became standardized across various media devices, from cassette players to CD players, and eventually digital interfaces.

Name or function	Symbol	Unicode (text and emoji variants depend on font support)			ISO 7000 / IEC 60417	
Play	A black isosceles triangle pointing right	U+23F5	▶	▶️	#5107B Normal run; Normal speed	To identify the switch or switch position by means of which a normal run (e.g. of tape) is started in the indicated direction.
Pause	Two congruent black rectangles side-by-side with a space between them	U+23F8	⏸	⏸️	#5111B Pause; Interruption	To identify the control or the indicator which stops operation intermittently and keeps the equipment in operating mode.
Play/pause toggle	A black isosceles triangle pointing right next to two congruent black rectangles side-by-side with a space between them	U+23EF	⏯	⏯️	—	To identify the control or the indicator which toggles between the present state of playing or pause, to the other.
Reverse	A black isosceles triangle pointing left	U+23F4	◀	◀️	—	
Stop	A black square	U+23F9	⏹	⏹️	#5110B Stop	To identify the control or the indicator to stop the active function.
Rewind, fast backwards	Two congruent black triangles pointing to the left	U+23EA	⏪︎	⏪	—	To identify the switch or switch position by which a faster than normal run (e.g. of tape) is started in the indicated direction.
Fast forward	Two congruent black triangles pointing to the right	U+23E9	⏩︎	⏩	#5108B Fast run; fast speed	To identify the switch or switch position by which a faster than normal run (e.g. of tape) is started in the indicated direction.
Skip backward (to the start or previous file/track/chapter)	A black rectangle to the left of two left-pointing black triangles	U+23EE	⏮	⏮️	#5862 Previous; to play previous part	To identify the control or the indicator to skip back to the top of the previous section, play the section and then stop.
Skip forward (to the end or next file/track/chapter)	A black rectangle to the right of two right-pointing black triangles	U+23ED	⏭	⏭️	#5861 Next; to play next part, #1116 Movement with normal speed in direction of arrow to a fixed position	To identify the control or the indicator to play the next part and then stop.
Record	A red circle	U+23FA	⏺	⏺️	#5547 Recording, general	To identify a control to preset or start a recording mode.
Eject	A black rectangle beneath a black triangle pointing upward	U+23CF	⏏	⏏️	#5459 Eject	To identify the control for the eject function.
Shuffle	Two arrows crossing each other	U+1F500	🔀︎︎	🔀	—	To randomly play a song from a given list. Usually the song is not chosen out of true randomness but rather following specific rules to prevent a song from repeating too often.
Repeat (indefinitely)	Two arrows creating a "loop", each pointing to the other's end	U+1F501	🔁︎	🔁️	#0026 Automatic cycle; semi-automatic cycle, #5557 Auto reverse continuously	To indicate an automatic sequence of machine functions repeated continuously without manual intervention. To identify a feature or a selector control that reverses automatically the tape running direction every time the tape comes to either of its limits.
Repeat once		U+1F502	🔂︎	🔂️	—	
Information		U+2139	ℹ	ℹ️	#6222 Information, general; help, general	To identify the control to examine the status of the equipment.
Reload		U+1F503	🔃︎	🔃	—	
Refresh		U+1F504	🔄︎	🔄	—	
Replay, Play again, Play from start					#5125A Recapitulate	To identify the control or the indicator which permits rapid access within a recorded programme to repeat the section which has just been played.

== In popular culture ==
=== Consumer products ===
The Play symbol is arguably the most widely used of the media control symbols. In many ways, this symbol has become synonymous with music culture and more broadly the digital download era. As such, there are now a multitude of items such as T-shirts, posters, and tattoos that feature this symbol. Similar cultural references can be observed with the Power symbol which is especially popular among video gamers and technology enthusiasts.

=== Branding ===
Media symbols can be found on an array of advertisements: from live music venues to streaming services.

In 2012, Google rebranded its digital download store to Google Play, using the Play symbol in its logo. The Play symbol also serves as a logo for YouTube since 2017. Television station owners Morgan Murphy Media and TEGNA have begun to institute the Play symbol into the logos of their stations to further connect their websites to their over-the-air television presences.

== Use on appliances and other mechanical devices ==
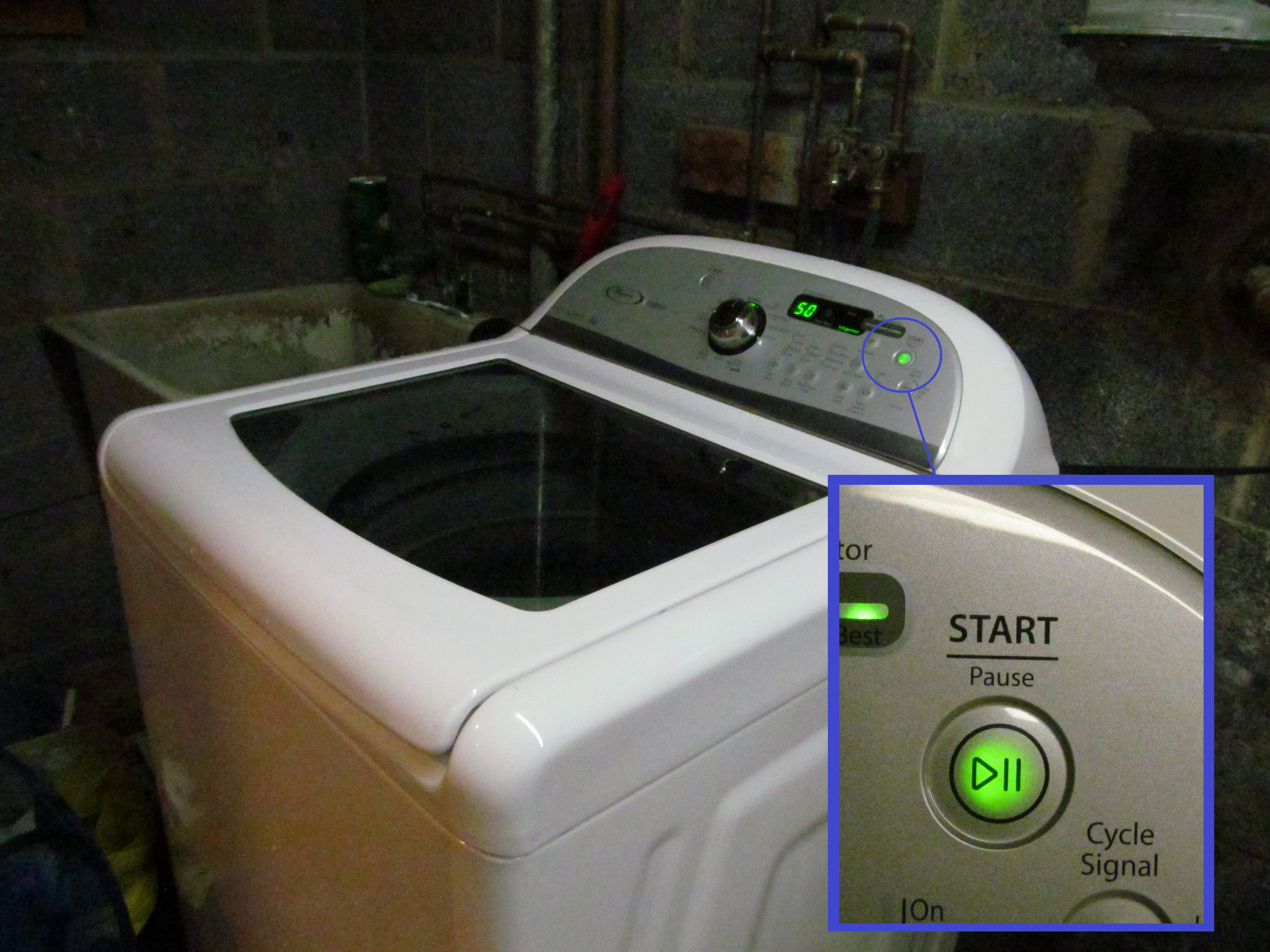
A washing machine with an illuminated Play/Pause (⏯) symbol.

Since the 2000s, there has been a proliferation of electronics that use media control symbols in order to represent the Run, Stop, and Pause functions. Likewise, user interface programing pertaining to these functions has also been influenced by that of media players.

For example, some washers and dryers with an illuminated Play/pause button are programmed such that it stays lit when the appliance is running. A line of Philips pasta makers has the Play/pause button for controlling the pasta-making process.

== See also ==
- List of international common standards
- Power symbol
- Miscellaneous Technical
