= Diamond operator =

In number theory, the diamond operators 〈d〉 are operators acting on the space of modular forms for the congruence subgroup Γ_{1}(N), given by the action of a matrix (^{a b}_{c δ}) in Γ_{0}(N) where δ ≈ d mod N. The diamond operators form an abelian group and commute with the Hecke operators.

== Unicode ==
In Unicode, the diamond operator is represented by the character U+22C4 ⋄ DIAMOND OPERATOR.
