= Monus =

Truncating subtraction on natural numbers, or a generalization thereof

In mathematics, monus is an operator on certain commutative monoids that are not groups. A commutative monoid on which a monus operator is defined is called a commutative monoid with monus, or CMM. The monus operator may be denoted with the minus sign, "$-$", because the natural numbers are a CMM under subtraction. It is also denoted with a dotted minus sign, "$\mathbin{\dot{-}}$", to distinguish it from the standard subtraction operator.

== Notation ==
glyph	Unicode name	Unicode code point	HTML character entity reference	HTML/XML numeric character references	TeX
$\mathbin{\dot{-}}$	DOT MINUS	U+2238		&#8760;	\dot -
−	MINUS SIGN	U+2212	&minus;	&#8722;	-

A use of the monus symbol is seen in Dennis Ritchie's PhD Thesis from 1968.

== Definition ==
Let $(M, +, 0)$ be a commutative monoid. Define a binary relation $\leq$ on this monoid as follows: for any two elements $a$ and $b$, define $a \leq b$ if there exists an element $c$ such that $a + c = b$. It is easy to check that $\leq$ is reflexive and that it is transitive. $M$ is called naturally ordered if the $\leq$ relation is additionally antisymmetric and hence a partial order. Further, if for each pair of elements $a$ and $b$, a unique smallest element $c_0$ exists such that $a \leq b + c_0$, then M is called a commutative monoid with monus and the monus $a \mathbin{\dot{-}} b$ of any two elements $a$ and $b$ can be defined as this unique smallest element $c_0$ such that $a \leq b + c_0$.

An example of a commutative monoid that is not naturally ordered is $(\mathbb{Z}, +, 0)$, the commutative monoid of the integers with usual addition, as for any $a, b \in \mathbb{Z}$ there exists $c$ such that $a + c = b$, so $a \leq b$ holds for any $a, b \in \mathbb{Z}$, so $\leq$ is not antisymmetric and therefore not a partial order. There are also examples of monoids that are naturally ordered but are not semirings with monus.

== Other structures ==
Beyond monoids, the notion of monus can be applied to other structures. For instance, a naturally ordered semiring (sometimes called a dioid) is a semiring where the commutative monoid induced by the addition operator is naturally ordered. When this monoid is a commutative monoid with monus, the semiring is called a semiring with monus, or m-semiring.

== Examples ==
If M is an ideal in a Boolean algebra, then M is a commutative monoid with monus under $a + b = a \vee b$ and $a \mathbin{\dot{-}} b = a \wedge \neg b$.

=== Natural numbers ===
The natural numbers including 0 form a commutative monoid with monus, with their ordering being the usual order of natural numbers and the monus operator being a saturating variant of standard subtraction, variously referred to as truncated subtraction, limited subtraction, proper subtraction, doz (difference or zero), and monus. Truncated subtraction is usually defined as

$$a \mathbin{\dot{-}} b =
\begin{cases}
0 & \mbox{if } a < b \\
a - b & \mbox{if } a \ge b,
\end{cases}$$

where − denotes standard subtraction. For example, $5 - 3 = 2$ and $3 - 5 = -2$ in regular subtraction, whereas in truncated subtraction $3 \mathbin{\dot{-}} 5 = 0$. Truncated subtraction may also be defined as

$$a \mathbin{\dot{-}} b = \max(a - b, 0).$$

In Peano arithmetic, truncated subtraction is defined in terms of the predecessor function P (the inverse of the successor function):

$$\begin{align}
P(0)    &= 0 \\
P(S(a)) &= a \\
a \mathbin{\dot{-}} 0 &= a \\
a \mathbin{\dot{-}} S(b) &= P(a \mathbin{\dot{-}} b).
\end{align}$$

A definition that does not need the predecessor function is:

$$\begin{align}
a \mathbin{\dot{-}} 0 &= a \\
0 \mathbin{\dot{-}} b &= 0 \\
S(a) \mathbin{\dot{-}} S(b) &= a \mathbin{\dot{-}} b.
\end{align}$$

Truncated subtraction is useful in contexts such as primitive recursive functions, which are not defined over negative numbers. Truncated subtraction is also used in the definition of the multiset difference operator.

== Properties ==
The class of all commutative monoids with monus form a variety. The equational basis for the variety of all CMMs consists of the axioms for commutative monoids, as well as the following axioms:

$$\begin{align}
a + (b \mathbin{\dot{-}} a) &= b + (a \mathbin{\dot{-}} b),\\
(a \mathbin{\dot{-}} b) \mathbin{\dot{-}} c &= a \mathbin{\dot{-}} (b + c),\\
(a \mathbin{\dot{-}} a) &= 0,\\
(0 \mathbin{\dot{-}} a) &= 0.\\
\end{align}$$
