= Element of a set =

Any one of the distinct objects that make up a set in set theory

In mathematics, an element (or member) of a set is any one of the distinct objects that belong to that set. For example, given a set called A containing the first four positive integers ($A = \{1, 2, 3, 4\}$), one could say that "3 is an element of A", expressed notationally as $3 \in A$.

== Sets ==
Writing $A = \{1, 2, 3, 4\}$ means that the elements of the set A are the numbers 1, 2, 3 and 4. Sets of elements of A, for example $\{1, 2\}$, are subsets of A.

Sets can themselves be elements. For example, consider the set $B = \{1, 2, \{3, 4\}\}$. The elements of B are not 1, 2, 3, and 4. Rather, there are only three elements of B, namely the numbers 1 and 2, and the set $\{3, 4\}$.

The elements of a set can be anything. For example the elements of the set $C = \{\mathrm{\color{Red}red}, \mathrm{12}, B\}$ are the color red, the number 12, and the set B.

In logic, a set can be defined in terms of the membership of its elements as $(x \in y) \leftrightarrow \forall x[P_x = y]: x \in \mathfrak D y$. This basically means that there is a general predication of x called membership that is equivalent to the statement ‘x is a member of y if and only if, for all objects x, the general predication of x is identical to y, where x is a member of the domain of y.’ The expression x ∈ 𝔇y makes this definition well-defined by ensuring that x is a bound variable in its predication of membership in y.

In this case, the domain of Px, which is the set containing all dependent logical values x that satisfy the stated conditions for membership in y, is called the Universe (U) of y. The range of Px, which is the set of all possible dependent set variables y resulting from satisfaction of the conditions of membership for x, is the power set of U such that the binary relation of the membership of x in y is any subset of the cartesian product U × 𝒫(U) (the Cartesian Product of set U with the Power Set of U).

== Notation and terminology ==
The binary relation "is an element of", also called set membership, is denoted by the symbol "∈". Writing
$$x \in A$$
means that "x is an element of A". Equivalent expressions are "x is a member of A", "x belongs to A", "x is in A" and "x lies in A". The expressions "A includes x" and "A contains x" are also used to mean set membership, although some authors use them to mean instead "x is a subset of A". Logician George Boolos strongly urged that "contains" be used for membership only, and "includes" for the subset relation only.

For the relation ∈ , the converse relation ∈^{T} may be written
$$A \ni x$$
meaning "A contains or includes x".

The negation of set membership is denoted by the symbol "∉". Writing
$$x \notin A$$
means that "x is not an element of A".

The symbol ∈ was first used by Giuseppe Peano, in his 1889 work Arithmetices principia, nova methodo exposita. Here he wrote on page X:

Signum ∈ significat est. Ita a ∈ b legitur a est quoddam b; …

which means

The symbol ∈ means is. So a ∈ b is read as a is a certain b; …

The symbol itself is a stylized lowercase Greek letter epsilon ("ϵ"), the first letter of the word ἐστί, which means "is".

Character information
| Preview | ∈ | | ∉ | | ∋ | | ∌ | |
|---|---|---|---|---|---|---|---|---|
| Unicode name | ELEMENT OF | | NOT AN ELEMENT OF | | CONTAINS AS MEMBER | | DOES NOT CONTAIN AS MEMBER | |
| Encodings | decimal | hex | dec | hex | dec | hex | dec | hex |
| Unicode | 8712 | U+2208 | 8713 | U+2209 | 8715 | U+220B | 8716 | U+220C |
| UTF-8 | 226 136 136 | E2 88 88 | 226 136 137 | E2 88 89 | 226 136 139 | E2 88 8B | 226 136 140 | E2 88 8C |
| Numeric character reference | &#8712; | &#x2208; | &#8713; | &#x2209; | &#8715; | &#x220B; | &#8716; | &#x220C; |
| Named character reference | &Element;, &in;, &isin;, &isinv; | | &NotElement;, &notin;, &notinva; | | &ni;, &niv;, &ReverseElement;, &SuchThat; | | &notni;, &notniva;, &NotReverseElement; | |
| LaTeX | \in | | \notin | | \ni | | \not\ni or \notni | |
| Wolfram Mathematica | \[Element] | | \[NotElement] | | \[ReverseElement] | | \[NotReverseElement] | |

== Examples ==
Using the sets defined above, namely A = {1, 2, 3, 4}, B = {1, 2, {3, 4}} and C = {red, 12, B}, the following statements are true:

- 2 ∈ A
- 5 ∉ A
- {3, 4} ∈ B
- 3 ∉ B
- 4 ∉ B
- yellow ∉ C

== Cardinality of sets ==
The number of elements in a particular set is a property known as cardinality; informally, this is the size of a set. In the above examples, the cardinality of the set A is 4, while the cardinality of set B and set C are both 3. An infinite set is a set with an infinite number of elements, while a finite set is a set with a finite number of elements. The above examples are examples of finite sets. An example of an infinite set is the set of positive integers {1, 2, 3, 4, ...}.

== Formal relation ==
As a relation, set membership must have a domain and a range. Conventionally the domain is called the universe denoted U. The range is the set of subsets of U called the power set of U and denoted P(U). Thus the relation $\in$ is a subset of U × P(U). The converse relation $\ni$ is a subset of P(U) × U.

== See also ==
- Identity element
- Singleton (mathematics)
