= Descending wedge =

Logic symbol resembling a "V"

The descending wedge symbol ∨ may represent:

- Logical disjunction in propositional logic
- Join in lattice theory
- The wedge sum in topology
- The V sign, a symbol representing peace among other things

The vertically reflected symbol, ∧, is a wedge, and often denotes a related or dual operator.

The ∨ symbol was introduced by Russell and Whitehead in Principia Mathematica, where they called it the Logical Sum or Disjunctive Function.

In Unicode the symbol is encoded U+2228 ∨ LOGICAL OR (&or;, &vee;). In TeX, it is \vee or \lor.

One motivation and the most probable explanation for the choice of the symbol ∨ is the latin word "vel" meaning "or" in the inclusive sense. Several authors use "vel" as name of the "or" function.

== See also ==
- List of mathematical symbols
- List of logic symbols
