= Approximation =

Something roughly the same as something else

An approximation is anything that is intentionally similar but not exactly equal to something else.

== Etymology and usage ==
The word approximation is derived from Latin approximatus, from proximus meaning very near and the prefix ad- (ad- before p becomes ap- by assimilation) meaning to. Words like approximate, approximately and approximation are used especially in technical or scientific contexts. In everyday English, words such as roughly or around are used with a similar meaning. It is often found abbreviated as approx.

The term can be applied to various properties (e.g., value, quantity, image, description) that are nearly, but not exactly correct; similar, but not exactly the same (e.g., the approximate time was 10 o'clock).

Although approximation is most often applied to numbers, it is also frequently applied to such things as mathematical functions, shapes, and physical laws.

In science, approximation can refer to using a simpler process or model when the correct model is difficult to use. An approximate model is used to make calculations easier. Approximations might also be used if incomplete information prevents use of exact representations.

The type of approximation used depends on the available information, the degree of accuracy required, the sensitivity of the problem to this data, and the savings (usually in time and effort) that can be achieved by approximation.

== Mathematics ==
Approximation theory is a branch of mathematics, and a quantitative part of functional analysis. Diophantine approximation deals with approximations of real numbers by rational numbers.

Approximation usually occurs when an exact form or an exact numerical number is unknown or difficult to obtain. However some known form may exist and may be able to represent the real form so that no significant deviation can be found. For example, 1.5 × 10^{6} means that the true value of something being measured is 1,500,000 to the nearest hundred thousand (so the actual value is somewhere between 1,450,000 and 1,550,000); this is in contrast to the notation 1.500 × 10^{6}, which means that the true value is 1,500,000 to the nearest thousand (implying that the true value is somewhere between 1,499,500 and 1,500,500).

Numerical approximations sometimes result from using a small number of significant digits. Calculations are likely to involve rounding errors and other approximation errors. Log tables, slide rules and calculators produce approximate answers to all but the simplest calculations. The results of computer calculations are normally an approximation expressed in a limited number of significant digits, although they can be programmed to produce more precise results. Approximation can occur when a decimal number cannot be expressed in a finite number of binary digits.

Related to approximation of functions is the asymptotic value of a function, i.e. the value as one or more of a function's parameters becomes arbitrarily large. For example, the sum $k/2+k/4+k/8+ \cdots +k/2^n$ is asymptotically equal to k. No consistent notation is used throughout mathematics and some texts use ≈ to mean approximately equal and ~ to mean asymptotically equal whereas other texts use the symbols the other way around.

=== Typography ===
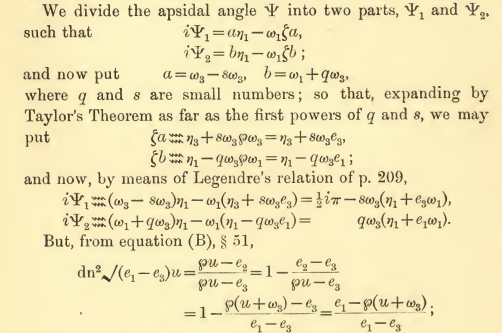
One of the first uses of a symbol similar to (≈), "approximately equal to." - Alfred Greenhill (1892)

The approximately equals sign, ≈, was introduced (in a slightly different version) by the British mathematician Alfred Greenhill in 1892, in his book Applications of Elliptic Functions.

≅ ≈ o

Approximately equal to Almost equal to
- In Unicode: U+2245 ≅ APPROXIMATELY EQUAL TO (&cong;, &TildeFullEqual;); U+2248 ≈ ALMOST EQUAL TO (&ap;, &approx;, &asymp;, &thickapprox;, &thkap;, &TildeTilde;)

Different from
- Different from: U+2242 ≂ MINUS TILDE

Related
- See also: U+2249 ≉ NOT ALMOST EQUAL TO; U+003D = EQUALS SIGN; U+2243 ≃ ASYMPTOTICALLY EQUAL TO

==== LaTeX symbols ====
Typical meanings of LaTeX symbols.

- $\approx$ (\approx) : approximate equality, like $\pi \approx 3.14$.
- $\not\approx$ (\not\approx) : inequality, despite any approximation ($1 \not\approx 2$).
- $\simeq$ (\simeq) : function asymptotic equivalence, like $f(n) \simeq 3n^2$.
  - Thus, $\pi \simeq 3.14$ is wrong under this definition, despite wide use.
- $\sim$ (\sim) : function proportionality; the $f(n)$ used in \simeq is $f(n) \sim n^2$.
- $\cong$ (\cong) : figure congruence, like $\Delta ABC \cong \Delta A'B'C'$.
- $\eqsim$ (\eqsim) : equal up to a constant.
- $\lessapprox$ (\lessapprox) and $\gtrapprox$ (\gtrapprox) : either an inequality holds or approximate equality.

==== Unicode ====
Approximate equalities denoted by wavy or dotted symbols.

U+223C ∼ TILDE OPERATOR	Sometimes indicates proportionality
U+223D ∽ REVERSED TILDE	Sometimes indicates proportionality
U+2243 ≃ ASYMPTOTICALLY EQUAL TO	Combined "≈" and "=", representing asymptotic equality
U+2245 ≅ APPROXIMATELY EQUAL TO	Combined "≈" and "=", representing isomorphism or congruence
U+2246 ≆ APPROXIMATELY BUT NOT ACTUALLY EQUAL TO	
U+2247 ≇ NEITHER APPROXIMATELY NOR ACTUALLY EQUAL TO	
U+2248 ≈ ALMOST EQUAL TO	
U+2249 ≉ NOT ALMOST EQUAL TO	
U+224A ≊ ALMOST EQUAL OR EQUAL TO	Combined "≈" and "=", representing equivalence or approximate equivalence
U+2250 ≐ APPROACHES THE LIMIT	Represents a variable, like y, approaching a limit, for example, $\lim_{x \to \infty} y(x) \doteq 0$
U+2252 ≒ APPROXIMATELY EQUAL TO OR THE IMAGE OF	Equivalent to "≈" or "≃" in Japan, Taiwan, and Korea
U+2253 ≓ IMAGE OF OR APPROXIMATELY EQUAL TO	Reversed variant of "≒" (U+2252)
U+225F ≟ QUESTIONED EQUAL TO	
U+2A85 ⪅ LESS-THAN OR APPROXIMATE	
U+2A86 ⪆ GREATER-THAN OR APPROXIMATE	

== Science ==
Approximation arises naturally in scientific experiments. The predictions of a scientific theory can differ from actual measurements. This can be because there are factors in the real situation that are not included in the theory. For example, simple calculations of motion in an atmosphere may not include the effect of air resistance. Under these circumstances, the theory is an approximation to reality. Differences may also arise because of limitations in the measuring technique. In this case, the measurement is an approximation to the actual value.

The history of science shows that earlier theories and laws can be approximations to some deeper set of laws. Under the correspondence principle, a new scientific theory should reproduce the results of older, well-established, theories in those domains where the old theories work. The old theory becomes an approximation to the new theory.

Some problems in physics are too complex to solve by direct analysis, or progress could be limited by available analytical tools. Thus, even when the exact representation is known, an approximation may yield a sufficiently accurate solution while reducing the complexity of the problem significantly. Physicists often approximate the shape of the Earth as a sphere even though more accurate representations are possible, because many physical characteristics (e.g., gravity) are much easier to calculate for a sphere than for other shapes.

Approximation is also used to analyze the motion of several planets orbiting a star. This is extremely difficult due to the complex interactions of the planets' gravitational effects on each other. An approximate solution is effected by performing iterations. In the first iteration, the planets' gravitational interactions are ignored, and the star is assumed to be fixed. If a more precise solution is desired, another iteration is then performed, using the positions and motions of the planets as identified in the first iteration, but adding a first-order gravity interaction from each planet on the others. This process may be repeated until a satisfactorily precise solution is obtained.

The use of perturbations to correct for the errors can yield more accurate solutions. Simulations of the motions of the planets and the star also yields more accurate solutions.

The most common versions of philosophy of science accept that empirical measurements are always approximations — they do not perfectly represent what is being measured.

== Law ==
Within the European Union (EU), "approximation" refers to a process through which EU legislation is implemented and incorporated within Member States' national laws, despite variations in the existing legal framework in each country. Approximation is required as part of the pre-accession process for new member states, and as a continuing process when required by an EU Directive. Approximation is a key word generally employed within the title of a directive, for example the Trade Marks Directive of 16 December 2015 serves "to approximate the laws of the Member States relating to trade marks". The European Commission describes approximation of law as "a unique obligation of membership in the European Union".

== See also ==
- Approximation algorithm – Class of algorithms that find approximate solutions to optimization problems
- Approximate computing – Computation of nearly accurate results
- Approximations of π – Varying methods used to calculate pi
- Binomial approximation – Approximation of powers of some binomials
- Congruence relation – Equivalence relation in algebra
- Double tilde (disambiguation) – Various meanings of ~~ or ≈
- Estimation – Process of finding an approximation
- Fermi problem – Estimation problem in physics or engineering
- Idealization (philosophy of science) – Scientific models assumption of facts
- Least squares – Approximation method in statistics
- Linear approximation – Approximation of a function by its tangent line at a point
- Newton's method – Algorithm for finding zeros of functions
- Order of approximation – Expressions for approximation accuracy
- Rough set – Approximation of a mathematical set
- Runge–Kutta methods – Family of implicit and explicit iterative methods
- Significant figures – Digit necessary to represent a quantity
- Small-angle approximation – Simplification of the basic trigonometric functions
- Successive-approximation ADC – Type of analog-to-digital converter
- Taylor series – Mathematical approximation of a function
- Tolerance relation – Math relation that is reflexive and symmetric
- Intuition – Ability to acquire knowledge without conscious reasoning
