= List of Greek letters =

This is a list of letters of the Greek alphabet. The definition of a Greek letter for this list is a character encoded in the Unicode standard that has a script property of "Greek" and the general category of "Letter". An overview of the distribution of Greek letters is given in Greek script in Unicode.

== Letters contained in the modern Greek alphabet ==
Greek alphabet
Αα	Ββ	Γγ	Δδ	Εε	Ζζ	Ηη	Θθ	Ιι	Κκ	Λλ	Μμ	Νν	Ξξ	Οο	Ππ	Ρρ	Σσς	Ττ	Υυ	Φφ	Χχ	Ψψ	Ωω

== Extensions ==
Letter	Name	Notes
Ͱͱ	Heta	Archaic letter for voiceless glottal fricative
Ͳͳ	Archaic Sampi	Archaic sibilant letter
Ϝϝ	Digamma	Archaic letter for /w/
Ͷͷ	Tsan	Archaic letter for /ts/
Ϻϻ	San	Archaic letter for /s/
Ϸϸ	Sho	Bactrian letter for /ʃ/
Ϙϙ	Archaic Koppa	Letter for /k/ before Ο, Υ, and Ω
Ϛϛ	Stigma	Archaic ligature for στ, retained in iconography
Ϳϳ	Yot	Greek linguistics letter for /j/
Ϗϗ	Kai	Ligature abbreviating the word kai

== Letters with diacritics ==
The letters with diacritics below are those which do not denote the typical phonemes described with the standard Greek diacritics (archaic or otherwise).

Letter	Name	Notes
Ζ̌ζ̌	Zeta with caron	Nonstandard letter for Cypriot Greek representing /ʒ/
Κ̌κ̌	Kappa with caron	Nonstandard letter for Cypriot Greek representing /c/ and /t͡ʃ/
Λ̌λ̌	Lambda with caron	Nonstandard letter for Cypriot Greek representing /ʎ/
Ν̌ν̌	Nu with caron	Nonstandard letter for Cypriot Greek representing /ɲ/
Ξ̌ξ̌	Xi with caron	Nonstandard letter for Cypriot Greek representing /kʃ/
Π̌π̌	Pi with caron	Nonstandard letter for Cypriot Greek representing /pʲ/
ῤ	Rho with smooth breathing	Archaic letter denoting /r/
Ῥῥ	Rho with rough breathing	Archaic letter denoting /r̥/
Σ̌σ̌ς̌	Sigma with caron	Nonstandard letter for Cypriot Greek representing /ʃ/
Τ̌τ̌	Tau with caron	Nonstandard letter for Cypriot Greek representing /c/
Ψ̌ψ̌	Psi with caron	Nonstandard letter for Cypriot Greek representing /pʃ/

== Other characters ==
Other Greek characters are omitted from the tables above:

- Subscript modifier letters β, γ, ρ, φ, and χ: ᵦ ᵧ ᵨ ᵩ ᵪ
- Superscript modifier letters β, γ, δ, θ, φ, and χ: ᵝ ᵞ ᵟ ᶿ ᵠ ᵡ
- Small capitals Γ, Λ, Π, Ρ, Ψ, and Ω: ᴦ ᴧ ᴨ ᴩ ᴪ ꭥ
- Glyph variants for β, ε, Θ, θ, κ, ρ, Σ, σ/ς, π, Υ, Ύ, Ϋ, φ: ϐ ϵ ϴ ϑ ϰ ϱ Ϲ ϲ ϖ ϒ ϓ ϔ ϕ
- OU ligature which is used in Greek but encoded as a Latin letter: Ȣȣ

== See also ==
- Greek alphabet
- Greek ligatures
- Greek letters used in mathematics
- Greek numerals
