= OMS encoding =

TeX encoding for mathematical symbols

OMS (aka TeX math symbol) is a 7-bit TeX encoding developed by Donald E. Knuth. It encodes mathematical symbols with variable sizes like for capital Pi notation, brackets, braces and radicals.

== Character set ==
OMS
	0	1	2	3	4	5	6	7	8	9	A	B	C	D	E	F
0x	−	⋅	×	∗	÷	⋄	±	∓	⊕	⊖	⊗	⊘	⊙	○	∘	∙
1x	≍	≡	⊆	⊇	≤	≥	≼	≽	∼	≈	⊂	⊃	≪	≫	≺	≻
2x	←	→	↑	↓	↔	↗	↘	≃	⇐	⇒	⇑	⇓	⇔	↖	↙	∝
3x	′	∞	∈	∋	△	▽	◌̸	◌̍	∀	∃	¬	∅	ℜ	ℑ	⊤	⊥
4x	ℵ	𝒜	ℬ	𝒞	𝒟	ℰ	ℱ	𝒢	ℋ	ℐ	𝒥	𝒦	ℒ	ℳ	𝒩	𝒪
5x	𝒫	𝒬	ℛ	𝒮	𝒯	𝒰	𝒱	𝒲	𝒳	𝒴	𝒵	∪	∩	⊎	∧	∨
6x	⊢	⊣	⌊	⌋	⌈	⌉	{	}	⟨	⟩	∣	∥	↕	⇕	∖	≀
7x	√	⨿	∇	∫	⊔	⊓	⊑	⊒	§	†	‡	¶	♣	♢	♡	♠

== See also ==
- OML encoding
- OT1 encoding
