= Letterlike Symbols =

Unicode block

- Range: U+2100..U+214F (80 code points)
- Plane: BMP
- Scripts: Greek (1 char.); Latin (4 char.); Common (75 char.)
- Symbol sets: Mathematics abbreviations
- Assigned: 80 code points
- Unused: 0 reserved code points

Unicode Version History
- 1.0.0 (1991): 57 (+57)
- 3.0 (1999): 59 (+2)
- 3.2 (2002): 74 (+15)
- 4.0 (2003): 75 (+1)
- 4.1 (2005): 77 (+2)
- 5.0 (2006): 79 (+2)
- 5.1 (2008): 80 (+1)

Unicode documentation
- Code chart ∣ Web page

Letterlike Symbols is a Unicode block containing 80 characters which are constructed mainly from the glyphs of one or more letters. In addition to this block, Unicode includes full styled mathematical alphabets, although Unicode does not explicitly categorize those characters as being "letterlike."

== Symbols ==
Unicode Letterlike Symbols
Char	Image	Simulation	LaTeX	Name	Unicode U+
℀		^{a}/_{c}	$\mathrm{^a/_c}$	Account Of	2100
℁		^{a}/_{s}	$\mathrm{^a/_s}$	Addressed to the Subject (i.e., care of)	2101
ℂ			$}\mathbb{C$	Double-struck Capital C	2102
℃		°C	$^\circ }\mathrm{C$	Degree Celsius	2103
℄				Centre Line Symbol	2104
℅		^{c}/_{o}	$\mathrm{^c/_o}$	Care Of	2105
℆		^{c}/_{u}	$\mathrm{^c/_u}$	Cada Una (Spanish for "each one.")	2106
ℇ		Ɛ		Euler Constant (Note: Unicode does not record which constant this is supposed to be. Xerox standard XCCS 353/046, from which it is taken, just says "Euler's", and "the character committees just added 'CONSTANT' to it." Possible candidates are: Euler's number, ≈2.7 — this is more plausible, given its great ubiquity and the fact that it is typically represented with a glyph that looks like an e, or sometimes an epsilon.; Euler's constant, ≈0.577 — this is less likely, as the conventional symbol for it has never been an e of any sort, but instead γ or other letters. While this is the constant most usually known as "Euler's constant", Euler's number is also a constant.; For more on the notation of those two constants, see their pages. For more numbers named after Euler, see Numbers named after Euler.)	2107
℈		Э		Scruple	2108
℉		°F	$^\circ }\mathrm{F$	Degree Fahrenheit	2109
ℊ			$\mathcal{g}$	Script Small G	210A
ℋ			$}\mathcal{H$	Script Capital H	210B
ℌ			$}\mathfrak{H$	Black-letter Capital H	210C
ℍ			$}\mathbb{H$	Double-struck Capital H	210D
ℎ		h	$\mathit{h}$	Planck Constant	210E
ℏ		ħ	$\hslash$	Planck Constant Over Two Pi	210F
ℐ			$}\mathcal{I$	Script Capital I	2110
ℑ			$}\mathfrak{I$	Black-letter Capital I	2111
ℒ			$}\mathcal{L$	Script Capital L	2112
ℓ			$\ell$	Script Small L	2113
℔				L B Bar Symbol	2114
ℕ			$}\mathbb{N$	Double-struck Capital N	2115
№		N^{o} or No.		Numero Sign	2116
℗		Ⓟ		Sound Recording Copyright	2117
℘			$\wp$	Script Capital P alias: Weierstrass Elliptic Function	2118
ℙ			$}\mathbb{P$	Double-struck Capital P	2119
ℚ			$}\mathbb{Q$	Double-struck Capital Q	211A
ℛ			$}\mathcal{R$	Script Capital R	211B
ℜ			$}\mathfrak{R$	Black-letter Capital R	211C
ℝ			$}\mathbb{R$	Double-struck Capital R	211D
℞				Prescription Take	211E
℟				Response	211F
℠		^{SM}	$^\mathrm{SM}$	Service Mark	2120
℡		^{TEL}		Telephone Sign	2121
™		^{TM}	$^\mathrm{TM}$	Trademark Sign	2122
℣				Versicle	2123
ℤ			$}\mathbb{Z$	Double-struck Capital Z	2124
℥				Ounce Sign	2125
Ω (Note: canonically equivalent to the Greek uppercase omega character U+03A9 Ω GREEK CAPITAL LETTER OMEGA (&ohm;, &Omega;), which is thus preferred.)		Ω	$\Omega$	Ohm Sign	2126
℧		Ʊ	$\mho$	Inverted ohm Sign	2127
ℨ			$\mathfrak{Z}$	Black-letter Capital Z	2128
℩				Turned Greek Small Letter iota	2129
K		K	$\mathrm{K}$	Kelvin Sign	212A
Å (Note: canonically equivalent to U+00C5 Å LATIN CAPITAL LETTER A WITH RING ABOVE (&Aring;, &angst;), which is thus preferred.)		Å	$\AA$	Angstrom Sign	212B
ℬ			$}\mathcal{B$	Script capital B	212C
ℭ			$}\mathfrak{C$	Black-letter capital C	212D
℮				Estimated symbol	212E
ℯ			$\mathcal{e}$	Script small E	212F
ℰ			$}\mathcal{E$	Script capital E	2130
ℱ			$}\mathcal{F$	Script capital F	2131
Ⅎ			$\Finv$	Turned capital F	2132
ℳ			$}\mathcal{M$	Script capital M	2133
ℴ			$\mathcal{o}$	Script small O	2134
ℵ		א	$\aleph$	Alef symbol	2135
ℶ		ב	$\beth$	Bet symbol	2136
ℷ		ג	$\gimel$	Gimel symbol	2137
ℸ		ד	$\daleth$	Dalet symbol	2138
ℹ		i	$\mathbf{i}$	Information source (Note: See also: U+1F6C8 🛈 CIRCLED INFORMATION SOURCE)	2139
℺				Rotated capital Q	213A
℻		^{FAX}		Facsimile Sign	213B
ℼ			$\mathbb{\pi}$	Double-struck small pi	213C
ℽ			$\mathbb{\gamma}$	Double-struck small gamma	213D
ℾ			$\mathbb{\Gamma}$	Double-struck capital gamma	213E
ℿ			$\mathbb{\Pi}$	Double-struck capital pi	213F
⅀			$\mathbb{\sum}$	Double-struck n-ary summation	2140
⅁			$\Game$	Turned sans-serif capital G	2141
⅂				Turned sans-serif capital L	2142
⅃				Reversed sans-serif capital L	2143
⅄				Turned sans-serif capital Y	2144
ⅅ		𝔻		Double-struck italic capital D	2145
ⅆ		𝕕		Double-struck italic small D	2146
ⅇ		𝕖		Double-struck italic small E	2147
ⅈ		𝕚		Double-struck italic small I	2148
ⅉ		𝕛		Double-struck italic small J	2149
⅊				Property line	214A
⅋				Turned ampersand	214B
⅌				Per sign	214C
⅍		^{A}/_{S}	$\mathrm{^A/_S}$	Aktieselskab	214D
ⅎ			$\scriptstyle{\Finv}$	Turned small F	214E
⅏ (Note: "the form of which is based on the Samaritan letter shin (sometimes called shan)". For that letter, see U+0814 ࠔ SAMARITAN LETTER SHAN.)				Symbol for Samaritan source	214F

=== Glyph variants ===
Variation selectors may be used to specify chancery (U+FE00) vs roundhand (U+FE01) forms, if the font supports them:

Code point	Plain	FE00	FE01
U+212C	ℬ	ℬ︀	ℬ︁
U+2130	ℰ	ℰ︀	ℰ︁
U+2131	ℱ	ℱ︀	ℱ︁
U+210B	ℋ	ℋ︀	ℋ︁
U+2110	ℐ	ℐ︀	ℐ︁
U+2112	ℒ	ℒ︀	ℒ︁
U+2133	ℳ	ℳ︀	ℳ︁
U+211B	ℛ	ℛ︀	ℛ︁

The remainder of the set is at Mathematical Alphanumeric Symbols.

== Block ==
Letterlike Symbols^{[1]} Official Unicode Consortium code chart (PDF)
	0	1	2	3	4	5	6	7	8	9	A	B	C	D	E	F
U+210x	℀	℁	ℂ	℃	℄	℅	℆	ℇ	℈	℉	ℊ	ℋ	ℌ	ℍ	ℎ	ℏ
U+211x	ℐ	ℑ	ℒ	ℓ	℔	ℕ	№	℗	℘	ℙ	ℚ	ℛ	ℜ	ℝ	℞	℟
U+212x	℠	℡	™	℣	ℤ	℥	Ω	℧	ℨ	℩	K	Å	ℬ	ℭ	℮	ℯ
U+213x	ℰ	ℱ	Ⅎ	ℳ	ℴ	ℵ	ℶ	ℷ	ℸ	ℹ	℺	℻	ℼ	ℽ	ℾ	ℿ
U+214x	⅀	⅁	⅂	⅃	⅄	ⅅ	ⅆ	ⅇ	ⅈ	ⅉ	⅊	⅋	⅌	⅍	ⅎ	⅏
Notes 1.As of Unicode version 18.0

== Emoji ==
The Letterlike Symbols block contains two emoji: U+2122 and U+2139.

The block has four standardized variants defined to specify emoji-style (U+FE0F VS16) or text presentation (U+FE0E VS15) for the two emoji, both of which default to a text presentation.

Emoji variation sequences
U+	2122	2139
base character	™	ℹ
base+VS15 (text)	™︎	ℹ︎
base+VS16 (emoji)	™️	ℹ️

== History ==
The following Unicode-related documents record the purpose and process of defining specific characters in the Letterlike Symbols block:

Version	Final code points (Note: Proposed code points and characters names may differ from final code points and names)	Count	UTC ID	L2 ID	WG2 ID	Document
1.0.0	U+2100..2138	57				(to be determined)
1.0.0	U+2100..2138	57		L2/98-419 (pdf, doc)		Aliprand, Joan (1999-02-05), "Script capital P", Approved Minutes -- UTC #78 & NCITS Subgroup L2 # 175 Joint Meeting, San Jose, CA -- December 1-4, 1998
1.0.0	U+2100..2138	57	UTC/1999-017			Davis, Mark (1999-06-02), Data cross-checks (for Agenda)
1.0.0	U+2100..2138	57		L2/99-176R		Moore, Lisa (1999-11-04), "Data Cross-Checks", Minutes from the joint UTC/L2 meeting in Seattle, June 8-10, 1999
1.0.0	U+2100..2138	57		L2/05-137		Freytag, Asmus (2005-05-10), Handling "defective" names
1.0.0	U+2100..2138	57		L2/05-108R		Moore, Lisa (2005-08-26), "Consensus 103-C7", UTC #103 Minutes, "Create a "Normative Name Alias" property and file in the UCD. Populate the property with names from the sections "Typos" and "Bad or misleading names" from document L2/05-137."
1.0.0	U+2100..2138	57		L2/10-221		Moore, Lisa (2010-08-23), "B.13.3 [U+2107, U+2118]", UTC #124 / L2 #221 Minutes
1.0.0	U+2100..2138	57			N3903 (pdf, doc)	"M57.06", Unconfirmed minutes of WG2 meeting 57, 2011-03-31, "WG2 accepts to add the formal name alias "WEIERSTRASS ELLIPTIC FUNCTION" to 2118 SCRIPT CAPITAL P."
1.0.0	U+2100..2138	57		L2/15-050R (Note: See also L2/13-207, L2/14-054, L2/14-063, L2/15-051A, L2/15-051B) (Note: Refer to the history section of the Miscellaneous Symbols and Pictographs block for additional emoji-related documents)		Davis, Mark; et al. (2015-01-29), Additional variation selectors for emoji
1.0.0	U+2100..2138	57		L2/20-275R		Sargent, Murray (2021-01-05), Proposed variation sequences for math calligraphic letters
1.0.0	U+2100..2138	57		L2/20-281		Hudson, John (2020-11-10), Recent evolution of math alphabetic calligraphic script style
1.0.0	U+2100..2138	57		L2/21-016R		Anderson, Deborah; Whistler, Ken; Pournader, Roozbeh; Moore, Lisa; Liang, Hai (2021-01-14), "25 Math Calligraphic Alphabets", Recommendations to UTC #166 January 2021 on Script Proposals
1.0.0	U+2100..2138	57		L2/21-009		Moore, Lisa (2021-01-27), "Consensus 166-C33", UTC #166 Minutes, "The UTC accepts 52 variation sequences to distinguish roundhand and chancery style mathematical script alphabetic characters"
3.0	U+2139	1			N1138	LaBonté, Alain (1995-01-30), Proposal to add new characters (Keyboard related) to 10646
3.0	U+2139	1			N1203	Umamaheswaran, V. S.; Ksar, Mike (1995-05-03), "6.1.6", Unconfirmed minutes of SC2/WG2 Meeting 27, Geneva
3.0	U+2139	1			N1303 (html, doc)	Umamaheswaran, V. S.; Ksar, Mike (1996-01-26), Minutes of Meeting 29, Tokyo
3.0	U+2139	1		L2/97-128	N1564	Paterson, Bruce (1997-05-15), Draft pDAM for various additional characters (the "holding bucket")
3.0	U+2139	1		L2/97-288	N1603	Umamaheswaran, V. S. (1997-10-24), "7.3", Unconfirmed Meeting Minutes, WG 2 Meeting # 33, Heraklion, Crete, Greece, 20 June – 4 July 1997
3.0	U+2139	1		L2/98-005R	N1682	Text of ISO 10646 - AMD 22 for PDAM registration and PDAM ballot, 1997-12-17
3.0	U+2139	1		L2/98-320	N1898	ISO/IEC 10646-1/FPDAM 22, AMENDMENT 22: Keyboard Symbols, 1998-10-22
3.0	U+2139	1			N1897	Paterson, Bruce; Everson, Michael (1998-10-22), Disposition of Comments - FPDAM22 - Keyboard Symbols - SC2 N3191
3.0	U+2139	1		L2/99-010	N1903 (pdf, html, doc)	Umamaheswaran, V. S. (1998-12-30), Minutes of WG 2 meeting 35, London, U.K.; 1998-09-21--25
3.0	U+2139	1		L2/99-126		Paterson, Bruce (1999-04-14), Text for FDAM ballot ISO/IEC 10646 FDAM #22 - Keyboard symbols
3.0	U+2139	1		L2/11-438 (Note: See also L2/10-458, L2/11-414, L2/11-415, and L2/11-429)	N4182	Edberg, Peter (2011-12-22), Emoji Variation Sequences (Revision of L2/11-429)
3.0	U+213A	1		L2/98-215	N1748	Everson, Michael (1998-05-25), Additional signature mark characters for the UCS
3.0	U+213A	1		L2/98-281R (pdf, html)		Aliprand, Joan (1998-07-31), "Signature Marks (IV.C.7)", Unconfirmed Minutes – UTC #77 & NCITS Subgroup L2 # 174 JOINT MEETING, Redmond, WA -- July 29-31, 1998
3.0	U+213A	1		L2/98-292R (pdf, html, Figure 1)		"2.7", Comments on proposals to add characters from ISO standards developed by ISO/TC 46/SC 4, 1998-08-19
3.0	U+213A	1		L2/98-292	N1840	"2.7", Comments on proposals to add characters from ISO standards developed by ISO/TC 46/SC 4, 1998-08-25
3.0	U+213A	1		L2/98-301	N1847	Everson, Michael (1998-09-12), Responses to NCITS/L2 and Unicode Consortium comments on numerous proposals
3.0	U+213A	1		L2/98-372	N1884R2 (pdf, doc)	Whistler, Ken; et al. (1998-09-22), Additional Characters for the UCS
3.0	U+213A	1		L2/98-329	N1920	Combined PDAM registration and consideration ballot on WD for ISO/IEC 10646-1/Amd. 30, AMENDMENT 30: Additional Latin and other characters, 1998-10-28
3.0	U+213A	1		L2/99-010	N1903 (pdf, html, doc)	Umamaheswaran, V. S. (1998-12-30), "8.1.5.1", Minutes of WG 2 meeting 35, London, U.K.; 1998-09-21--25
3.2	U+213D..2149, 214B	14		L2/00-119 (Note: Refer to the history section of the Miscellaneous Mathematical Symbols-B block for additional math-related documents)	N2191R	Whistler, Ken; Freytag, Asmus (2000-04-19), Encoding Additional Mathematical Symbols in Unicode
3.2	U+213D..2149, 214B	14		L2/00-234	N2203 (rtf, txt)	Umamaheswaran, V. S. (2000-07-21), "8.18", Minutes from the SC2/WG2 meeting in Beijing, 2000-03-21 -- 24
3.2	U+213D..2149, 214B	14		L2/00-115R2		Moore, Lisa (2000-08-08), "Motion 83-M11", Minutes Of UTC Meeting #83
3.2	U+213D..2149, 214B	14		L2/01-050	N2253	Umamaheswaran, V. S. (2001-01-21), "RESOLUTION M39.24", Minutes of the SC2/WG2 meeting in Athens, September 2000
3.2	U+213D..2149, 214B	14		L2/01-012R		Moore, Lisa (2001-05-21), "Motion 86-M32", Minutes UTC #86 in Mountain View, Jan 2001, "Change the name of the proposed character at U+2140 from DOUBLE STRUCK CAPITAL SIGMA to DOUBLE STRUCK N-ARY SUMMATION."
3.2	U+213D..2149, 214B	14		L2/01-227		Whistler, Ken (2001-05-22), "ITEM 5", WG2 Consent Docket for UTC #87
3.2	U+213D..2149, 214B	14		L2/01-184R		Moore, Lisa (2001-06-18), "Motion 87-M16, ITEM 5", Minutes from the UTC/L2 meeting
3.2	U+213D..2149, 214B	14		L2/01-344	N2353 (pdf, doc)	Umamaheswaran, V. S. (2001-09-09), "SE6", Minutes from SC2/WG2 meeting #40 -- Mountain View, April 2001
3.2	U+214A	1		L2/98-374	N1887R	Freytag, Asmus (1998-09-24), Three symbols
3.2	U+214A	1		L2/99-010	N1903 (pdf, html, doc)	Umamaheswaran, V. S. (1998-12-30), Minutes of WG 2 meeting 35, London, U.K.; 1998-09-21--25
3.2	U+214A	1		L2/00-091	N2184	Freytag, Asmus (2000-03-14), Additional information on the proposal to add three symbols
3.2	U+214A	1		L2/00-234	N2203 (rtf, txt)	Umamaheswaran, V. S. (2000-07-21), "8.7", Minutes from the SC2/WG2 meeting in Beijing, 2000-03-21 -- 24
3.2	U+214A	1		L2/00-115R2		Moore, Lisa (2000-08-08), Minutes Of UTC Meeting #83
4.0	U+213B	1		L2/99-353	N2056	"3", Amendment of the part concerning the Korean characters in ISO/IEC 10646-1:1998 amendment 5, 1999-07-29
4.0	U+213B	1		L2/99-380		Proposal for a New Work item (NP) to amend the Korean part in ISO/IEC 10646-1:1993, 1999-12-07
4.0	U+213B	1		L2/99-380.3		Annex B, Special characters compatible with KPS 9566-97 (To be extended), 1999-12-07
4.0	U+213B	1		L2/00-084	N2182	"3", Amendment of the part concerning the Korean characters in ISO/IEC 10646-1:1998 amendment 5 (Cover page and outline of proposal L2/99-380), 1999-12-07
4.0	U+213B	1		L2/99-382		Whistler, Ken (1999-12-09), "2.3", Comments to accompany a U.S. NO vote on JTC1 N5999, SC2 N3393, New Work item proposal (NP) for an amendment of the Korean part of ISO/IEC 10646-1:1993
4.0	U+213B	1		L2/00-066	N2170 (pdf, doc)	"3", The technical justification of the proposal to amend the Korean character part of ISO/IEC 10646-1 (proposed addition of 79 symbolic characters), 2000-02-10
4.0	U+213B	1		L2/00-073	N2167	Karlsson, Kent (2000-03-02), Comments on DPRK New Work Item proposal on Korean characters
4.0	U+213B	1		L2/00-285	N2244	Proposal for the Addition of 82 Symbols to ISO/IEC 10646-1:2000, 2000-08-10
4.0	U+213B	1		L2/00-291		Everson, Michael (2000-08-30), Comments to Korean proposals (L2/00-284 - 289)
4.0	U+213B	1			N2282	Report of the meeting of the Korean script ad hoc group, 2000-09-21
4.0	U+213B	1		L2/01-349	N2374R	Proposal to add of 70 symbols to ISO/IEC 10646-1:2000, 2001-09-03
4.0	U+213B	1		L2/01-387	N2390	Kim, Kyongsok (2001-10-13), ROK's Comments about DPRK's proposal, WG2 N 2374, to add 70 symbols to ISO/IEC 10646-1:2000
4.0	U+213B	1		L2/01-388	N2392	Kim, Kyongsok (2001-10-16), A Report of Korean Script ad hoc group meeting on Oct. 15, 2001
4.0	U+213B	1		L2/01-420		Whistler, Ken (2001-10-30), "f. Miscellaneous symbol additions from DPRK standard", WG2 (Singapore) Resolution Consent Docket for UTC
4.0	U+213B	1		L2/01-458	N2407	Umamaheswaran, V. S. (2001-11-16), Request to Korean ad hoc group to generate mapping tables between ROK and DPRK national standards
4.0	U+213B	1		L2/02-372	N2453 (pdf, doc)	Umamaheswaran, V. S. (2002-10-30), "M42.14 item j", Unconfirmed minutes of WG 2 meeting 42
4.1	U+213C, 214C	2		L2/03-194	N2590	Freytag, Asmus (2003-06-09), Additional Mathematical and Letterlike Characters
4.1	U+213C, 214C	2		L2/04-406		Freytag, Asmus; Sargent, Murray; Beeton, Barbara; Carlisle, David (2004-11-15), Progress report on Mathematical Symbols
5.0	U+214D	1		L2/04-394	N2887, N2889	Stötzner, Andreas (2004-11-09), Aktieselskab: Proposal to the Unicode Consortium
5.0	U+214E	1		L2/05-076		Davis, Mark (2005-02-10), Stability of Case Folding
5.0	U+214E	1		L2/05-183	N2957	Everson, Michael; Haugen, Odd Einar; Emiliano, António; Pedro, Susana; Grammel, Florian; Baker, Peter; Stötzner, Andreas; Dohnicht, Marcus; Luft, Diana (2005-08-02), Preliminary proposal to add medievalist characters to the UCS
5.0	U+214E	1		L2/05-191		Whistler, Ken (2005-08-02), Proposal for dealing with lowercase Claudian letters
5.0	U+214E	1		L2/05-193R2	N2960R	Everson, Michael (2005-08-12), Proposal to add Claudian Latin letters to the UCS
5.0	U+214E	1			N2942	Freytag, Asmus; Whistler, Ken (2005-08-12), Proposal to add nine lowercase characters
5.0	U+214E	1		L2/05-180		Moore, Lisa (2005-08-17), "Claudian (C.15)", UTC #104 Minutes
5.0	U+214E	1		L2/05-108R		Moore, Lisa (2005-08-26), "Stability of Case Folding (B.14.2)", UTC #103 Minutes
5.0	U+214E	1			N2953 (pdf, doc)	Umamaheswaran, V. S. (2006-02-16), "7.4.6, 8.2.3", Unconfirmed minutes of WG 2 meeting 47, Sophia Antipolis, France; 2005-09-12/15
5.1	U+214F	1		L2/06-245	N3217	Hudson, John; et al. (2006-07-27), Proposal to encode Samaritan Text symbol
5.1	U+214F	1		L2/06-324R2		Moore, Lisa (2006-11-29), "Consensus 109-C25", UTC #109 Minutes
5.1	U+214F	1		L2/07-268	N3253 (pdf, doc)	Umamaheswaran, V. S. (2007-07-26), "M50.17", Unconfirmed minutes of WG 2 meeting 50, Frankfurt-am-Main, Germany; 2007-04-24/27

== See also ==
- Greek in Unicode
- Latin script in Unicode
- Unicode symbols
- Mathematical operators and symbols in Unicode
- Mathematical Alphanumeric Symbols (Unicode block)
- Currency Symbols (Unicode block)
