= OML encoding =

TeX encoding for mathematical symbols

OML (aka TeX math italic) is a 7-bit TeX encoding developed by Donald E. Knuth. It encodes italic Latin and Greek letters for mathematical formulas and various symbols.

== Character set ==
OML
	0	1	2	3	4	5	6	7	8	9	A	B	C	D	E	F
0x	𝛤	𝛥	𝛩	𝛬	𝛯	𝛱	𝛴	𝛶	𝛷	𝛹	𝛺	𝛼	𝛽	𝛾	𝛿	𝜀
1x	𝜁	𝜂	𝜃	𝜄	𝜅	𝜆	𝜇	𝜈	𝜉	𝜋	𝜌	𝜎	𝜏	𝜐	𝜑	𝜒
2x	𝜓	𝜔	𝜖	𝜗	𝜛	𝜚	𝜍	𝜙	↼	↽	⇀	⇁	 (Note: Private use glyph for hook for left-pointing arrow)	 (Note: Private use glyph for hook for right-pointing arrow)	▷	◁
3x	0	1	2	3	4	5	6	7	8	9	.	,	<	/	>	⋆
4x	𝜕	𝐴	𝐵	𝐶	𝐷	𝐸	𝐹	𝐺	𝐻	𝐼	𝐽	𝐾	𝐿	𝑀	𝑁	𝑂
5x	𝑃	𝑄	𝑅	𝑆	𝑇	𝑈	𝑉	𝑊	𝑋	𝑌	𝑍	♭	♮	♯	◡	◠
6x	ℓ	𝑎	𝑏	𝑐	𝑑	𝑒	𝑓	𝑔	ℎ	𝑖	𝑗	𝑘	𝑙	𝑚	𝑛	𝑜
7x	𝑝	𝑞	𝑟	𝑠	𝑡	𝑢	𝑣	𝑤	𝑥	𝑦	𝑧	𝚤	𝚥	℘	◌⃗	◌͡

== See also ==
- OMS encoding
- OT1 encoding
