= Greek script in Unicode =

A number of Greek letters, variants, digits, and other symbols are supported by the Unicode character encoding standard.

== Blocks ==
As of version 18.0 of the Unicode Standard, 520 characters in the following blocks are classified as belonging to the Greek script:

- Greek and Coptic: U+0370–U+03FF (117 characters)
- Phonetic Extensions: U+1D00–U+1D7F (15 characters)
- Phonetic Extensions Supplement: U+1D80–U+1DBF (1 character: U+1DBF MODIFIER LETTER SMALL THETA)
- Greek Extended: U+1F00–U+1FFF (233 characters)
- Letterlike Symbols: U+2100–U+214F (1 character: U+2126 OHM SIGN)
- Latin Extended-E: U+AB30–U+AB6F (1 character: U+AB65 GREEK LETTER SMALL CAPITAL OMEGA)
- Latin Extended-G: U+1DF00–U+1DFFF (2 characters)
- Ancient Greek Numbers: U+10140–U+1018F (79 characters)
- Ancient Symbols: U+10190–U+101CF (1 character: U+101A0 GREEK SYMBOL TAU RHO)
- Ancient Greek Musical Notation: U+1D200–U+1D24F (70 characters)

== List ==
The following is a Unicode collation algorithm list of Greek characters and those Greek-derived characters that are sorted alongside them.

Most of the characters of the blocks listed above are included, except for the Ancient Greek Numbers, Ancient Symbols and Ancient Greek Musical Notation. In addition, the collation charts include Greek-derived characters from the following blocks:

- Latin-1 Supplement: U+0080–U+00FF (1 character: U+00B5 MICRO SIGN)
- CJK Compatibility: U+3300–U+33FF (8 characters)
- Mathematical Alphanumeric Symbols: U+1D400–U+1D7FF (282 characters)

Other Greek-derived characters are excluded from the collation charts, such as U+A7B5 LATIN SMALL LETTER BETA and Coptic letters.

α (U+03B1)	𝛂 (U+1D6C2)	𝛼 (U+1D6FC)	𝜶 (U+1D736)	𝝰 (U+1D770)	𝞪 (U+1D7AA)
Α (U+0391)	𝚨 (U+1D6A8)	𝛢 (U+1D6E2)	𝜜 (U+1D71C)	𝝖 (U+1D756)	𝞐 (U+1D790)
ἀ (U+1F00)	Ἀ (U+1F08)	ἄ (U+1F04)	Ἄ (U+1F0C)	ᾄ (U+1F84)	ᾌ (U+1F8C)
ἂ (U+1F02)	Ἂ (U+1F0A)	ᾂ (U+1F82)	ᾊ (U+1F8A)	ἆ (U+1F06)	Ἆ (U+1F0E)
ᾆ (U+1F86)	ᾎ (U+1F8E)	ᾀ (U+1F80)	ᾈ (U+1F88)	ἁ (U+1F01)	Ἁ (U+1F09)
ἅ (U+1F05)	Ἅ (U+1F0D)	ᾅ (U+1F85)	ᾍ (U+1F8D)	ἃ (U+1F03)	Ἃ (U+1F0B)
ᾃ (U+1F83)	ᾋ (U+1F8B)	ἇ (U+1F07)	Ἇ (U+1F0F)	ᾇ (U+1F87)	ᾏ (U+1F8F)
ᾁ (U+1F81)	ᾉ (U+1F89)	ά (U+03AC)	ά (U+1F71)	Ά (U+0386)	Ά (U+1FBB)
ᾴ (U+1FB4)	ὰ (U+1F70)	Ὰ (U+1FBA)	ᾲ (U+1FB2)	ᾰ (U+1FB0)	Ᾰ (U+1FB8)
ᾶ (U+1FB6)	ᾷ (U+1FB7)	ᾱ (U+1FB1)	Ᾱ (U+1FB9)	ᾳ (U+1FB3)	ᾼ (U+1FBC)

β (U+03B2)	ϐ (U+03D0)	𝛃 (U+1D6C3)	𝛽 (U+1D6FD)	𝜷 (U+1D737)	𝝱 (U+1D771)
𝞫 (U+1D7AB)	Β (U+0392)	𝚩 (U+1D6A9)	𝛣 (U+1D6E3)	𝜝 (U+1D71D)	𝝗 (U+1D757)
𝞑 (U+1D791)	ᵝ (U+1D5D)	ᵦ (U+1D66)			

γ (U+03B3)	ℽ (U+213D)	𝛄 (U+1D6C4)	𝛾 (U+1D6FE)	𝜸 (U+1D738)	𝝲 (U+1D772)
𝞬 (U+1D7AC)	Γ (U+0393)	ℾ (U+213E)	𝚪 (U+1D6AA)	𝛤 (U+1D6E4)	𝜞 (U+1D71E)
𝝘 (U+1D758)	𝞒 (U+1D792)	ᵞ (U+1D5E)	ᵧ (U+1D67)	ᴦ (U+1D26)	

δ (U+03B4)	𝛅 (U+1D6C5)	𝛿 (U+1D6FF)	𝜹 (U+1D739)	𝝳 (U+1D773)	𝞭 (U+1D7AD)
Δ (U+0394)	𝚫 (U+1D6AB)	𝛥 (U+1D6E5)	𝜟 (U+1D71F)	𝝙 (U+1D759)	𝞓 (U+1D793)
ᵟ (U+1D5F)

ε (U+03B5)	ϵ (U+03F5)	𝛆 (U+1D6C6)	𝛜 (U+1D6DC)	𝜀 (U+1D700)	𝜖 (U+1D716)
𝜺 (U+1D73A)	𝝐 (U+1D750)	𝝴 (U+1D774)	𝞊 (U+1D78A)	𝞮 (U+1D7AE)	𝟄 (U+1D7C4)
Ε (U+0395)	𝚬 (U+1D6AC)	𝛦 (U+1D6E6)	𝜠 (U+1D720)	𝝚 (U+1D75A)	𝞔 (U+1D794)
ἐ (U+1F10)	Ἐ (U+1F18)	ἔ (U+1F14)	Ἔ (U+1F1C)	ἒ (U+1F12)	Ἒ (U+1F1A)
ἑ (U+1F11)	Ἑ (U+1F19)	ἕ (U+1F15)	Ἕ (U+1F1D)	ἓ (U+1F13)	Ἓ (U+1F1B)
έ (U+03AD)	έ (U+1F73)	Έ (U+0388)	Έ (U+1FC9)	ὲ (U+1F72)	Ὲ (U+1FC8)

ϝ (U+03DD)	𝟋 (U+1D7CB)	Ϝ (U+03DC)	𝟊 (U+1D7CA)

ͷ (U+0377)	Ͷ (U+0376)

ϛ (U+03DB)	Ϛ (U+03DA)

ζ (U+03B6)	𝛇 (U+1D6C7)	𝜁 (U+1D701)	𝜻 (U+1D73B)	𝝵 (U+1D775)	𝞯 (U+1D7AF)
Ζ (U+0396)	𝚭 (U+1D6AD)	𝛧 (U+1D6E7)	𝜡 (U+1D721)	𝝛 (U+1D75B)	𝞕 (U+1D795)

ͱ (U+0371)	Ͱ (U+0370)

η (U+03B7)	𝛈 (U+1D6C8)	𝜂 (U+1D702)	𝜼 (U+1D73C)	𝝶 (U+1D776)	𝞰 (U+1D7B0)
Η (U+0397)	𝚮 (U+1D6AE)	𝛨 (U+1D6E8)	𝜢 (U+1D722)	𝝜 (U+1D75C)	𝞖 (U+1D796)
ἠ (U+1F20)	Ἠ (U+1F28)	ἤ (U+1F24)	Ἤ (U+1F2C)	ᾔ (U+1F94)	ᾜ (U+1F9C)
ἢ (U+1F22)	Ἢ (U+1F2A)	ᾒ (U+1F92)	ᾚ (U+1F9A)	ἦ (U+1F26)	Ἦ (U+1F2E)
ᾖ (U+1F96)	ᾞ (U+1F9E)	ᾐ (U+1F90)	ᾘ (U+1F98)	ἡ (U+1F21)	Ἡ (U+1F29)
ἥ (U+1F25)	Ἥ (U+1F2D)	ᾕ (U+1F95)	ᾝ (U+1F9D)	ἣ (U+1F23)	Ἣ (U+1F2B)
ᾓ (U+1F93)	ᾛ (U+1F9B)	ἧ (U+1F27)	Ἧ (U+1F2F)	ᾗ (U+1F97)	ᾟ (U+1F9F)
ᾑ (U+1F91)	ᾙ (U+1F99)	ή (U+03AE)	ή (U+1F75)	Ή (U+0389)	Ή (U+1FCB)
ῄ (U+1FC4)	ὴ (U+1F74)	Ὴ (U+1FCA)	ῂ (U+1FC2)	ῆ (U+1FC6)	ῇ (U+1FC7)
ῃ (U+1FC3)	ῌ (U+1FCC)				

θ (U+03B8)	ϑ (U+03D1)	𝛉 (U+1D6C9)	𝛝 (U+1D6DD)	𝜃 (U+1D703)	𝜗 (U+1D717)
𝜽 (U+1D73D)	𝝑 (U+1D751)	𝝷 (U+1D777)	𝞋 (U+1D78B)	𝞱 (U+1D7B1)	𝟅 (U+1D7C5)
Θ (U+0398)	ϴ (U+03F4)	𝚯 (U+1D6AF)	𝚹 (U+1D6B9)	𝛩 (U+1D6E9)	𝛳 (U+1D6F3)
𝜣 (U+1D723)	𝜭 (U+1D72D)	𝝝 (U+1D75D)	𝝧 (U+1D767)	𝞗 (U+1D797)	𝞡 (U+1D7A1)
ᶿ (U+1DBF)

ι (U+03B9)	ι (U+1FBE)	ͺ (U+037A)	𝛊 (U+1D6CA)	𝜄 (U+1D704)	𝜾 (U+1D73E)
𝝸 (U+1D778)	𝞲 (U+1D7B2)	Ι (U+0399)	𝚰 (U+1D6B0)	𝛪 (U+1D6EA)	𝜤 (U+1D724)
𝝞 (U+1D75E)	𝞘 (U+1D798)	ἰ (U+1F30)	Ἰ (U+1F38)	ἴ (U+1F34)	Ἴ (U+1F3C)
ἲ (U+1F32)	Ἲ (U+1F3A)	ἶ (U+1F36)	Ἶ (U+1F3E)	ἱ (U+1F31)	Ἱ (U+1F39)
ἵ (U+1F35)	Ἵ (U+1F3D)	ἳ (U+1F33)	Ἳ (U+1F3B)	ἷ (U+1F37)	Ἷ (U+1F3F)
ί (U+03AF)	ί (U+1F77)	Ί (U+038A)	Ί (U+1FDB)	ὶ (U+1F76)	Ὶ (U+1FDA)
ῐ (U+1FD0)	Ῐ (U+1FD8)	ῖ (U+1FD6)	ϊ (U+03CA)	Ϊ (U+03AA)	ΐ (U+0390)
ΐ (U+1FD3)	ῒ (U+1FD2)	ῗ (U+1FD7)	ῑ (U+1FD1)	Ῑ (U+1FD9)	

ϳ (U+03F3)	Ϳ (U+037F)

κ (U+03BA)	ϰ (U+03F0)	𝛋 (U+1D6CB)	𝛞 (U+1D6DE)	𝜅 (U+1D705)	𝜘 (U+1D718)
𝜿 (U+1D73F)	𝝒 (U+1D752)	𝝹 (U+1D779)	𝞌 (U+1D78C)	𝞳 (U+1D7B3)	𝟆 (U+1D7C6)
Κ (U+039A)	𝚱 (U+1D6B1)	𝛫 (U+1D6EB)	𝜥 (U+1D725)	𝝟 (U+1D75F)	𝞙 (U+1D799)
ϗ (U+03D7)	Ϗ (U+03CF)				

λ (U+03BB)	𝛌 (U+1D6CC)	𝜆 (U+1D706)	𝝀 (U+1D740)	𝝺 (U+1D77A)	𝞴 (U+1D7B4)
Λ (U+039B)	𝚲 (U+1D6B2)	𝛬 (U+1D6EC)	𝜦 (U+1D726)	𝝠 (U+1D760)	𝞚 (U+1D79A)
ᴧ (U+1D27)

μ (U+03BC)	µ (U+00B5)	𝛍 (U+1D6CD)	𝜇 (U+1D707)	𝝁 (U+1D741)	𝝻 (U+1D77B)
𝞵 (U+1D7B5)	Μ (U+039C)	𝚳 (U+1D6B3)	𝛭 (U+1D6ED)	𝜧 (U+1D727)	𝝡 (U+1D761)
𝞛 (U+1D79B)	㎂ (U+3382)	㎌ (U+338C)	㎍ (U+338D)	㎕ (U+3395)	㎛ (U+339B)
㎲ (U+33B2)	㎶ (U+33B6)	㎼ (U+33BC)			

ν (U+03BD)	𝛎 (U+1D6CE)	𝜈 (U+1D708)	𝝂 (U+1D742)	𝝼 (U+1D77C)	𝞶 (U+1D7B6)
Ν (U+039D)	𝚴 (U+1D6B4)	𝛮 (U+1D6EE)	𝜨 (U+1D728)	𝝢 (U+1D762)	𝞜 (U+1D79C)

ξ (U+03BE)	𝛏 (U+1D6CF)	𝜉 (U+1D709)	𝝃 (U+1D743)	𝝽 (U+1D77D)	𝞷 (U+1D7B7)
Ξ (U+039E)	𝚵 (U+1D6B5)	𝛯 (U+1D6EF)	𝜩 (U+1D729)	𝝣 (U+1D763)	𝞝 (U+1D79D)

ο (U+03BF)	𝛐 (U+1D6D0)	𝜊 (U+1D70A)	𝝄 (U+1D744)	𝝾 (U+1D77E)	𝞸 (U+1D7B8)
Ο (U+039F)	𝚶 (U+1D6B6)	𝛰 (U+1D6F0)	𝜪 (U+1D72A)	𝝤 (U+1D764)	𝞞 (U+1D79E)
ὀ (U+1F40)	Ὀ (U+1F48)	ὄ (U+1F44)	Ὄ (U+1F4C)	ὂ (U+1F42)	Ὂ (U+1F4A)
ὁ (U+1F41)	Ὁ (U+1F49)	ὅ (U+1F45)	Ὅ (U+1F4D)	ὃ (U+1F43)	Ὃ (U+1F4B)
ό (U+03CC)	ό (U+1F79)	Ό (U+038C)	Ό (U+1FF9)	ὸ (U+1F78)	Ὸ (U+1FF8)

π (U+03C0)	ϖ (U+03D6)	ℼ (U+213C)	𝛑 (U+1D6D1)	𝛡 (U+1D6E1)	𝜋 (U+1D70B)
𝜛 (U+1D71B)	𝝅 (U+1D745)	𝝕 (U+1D755)	𝝿 (U+1D77F)	𝞏 (U+1D78F)	𝞹 (U+1D7B9)
𝟉 (U+1D7C9)	Π (U+03A0)	ℿ (U+213F)	𝚷 (U+1D6B7)	𝛱 (U+1D6F1)	𝜫 (U+1D72B)
𝝥 (U+1D765)	𝞟 (U+1D79F)	ᴨ (U+1D28)			

ϻ (U+03FB)	Ϻ (U+03FA)

ϟ (U+03DF)	Ϟ (U+03DE)

ϙ (U+03D9)	Ϙ (U+03D8)

ρ (U+03C1)	ϱ (U+03F1)	𝛒 (U+1D6D2)	𝛠 (U+1D6E0)	𝜌 (U+1D70C)	𝜚 (U+1D71A)
𝝆 (U+1D746)	𝝔 (U+1D754)	𝞀 (U+1D780)	𝞎 (U+1D78E)	𝞺 (U+1D7BA)	𝟈 (U+1D7C8)
Ρ (U+03A1)	𝚸 (U+1D6B8)	𝛲 (U+1D6F2)	𝜬 (U+1D72C)	𝝦 (U+1D766)	𝞠 (U+1D7A0)
ᵨ (U+1D68)	ῤ (U+1FE4)	ῥ (U+1FE5)	Ῥ (U+1FEC)	ᴩ (U+1D29)	ϼ (U+03FC)

σ (U+03C3)	ϲ (U+03F2)	𝛓 (U+1D6D3)	𝛔 (U+1D6D4)	𝜍 (U+1D70D)	𝜎 (U+1D70E)
𝝇 (U+1D747)	𝝈 (U+1D748)	𝞁 (U+1D781)	𝞂 (U+1D782)	𝞻 (U+1D7BB)	𝞼 (U+1D7BC)
Σ (U+03A3)	Ϲ (U+03F9)	𝚺 (U+1D6BA)	𝛴 (U+1D6F4)	𝜮 (U+1D72E)	𝝨 (U+1D768)
𝞢 (U+1D7A2)	ς (U+03C2)				

ͼ (U+037C)	Ͼ (U+03FE)	ͻ (U+037B)	Ͻ (U+03FD)	ͽ (U+037D)	Ͽ (U+03FF)

τ (U+03C4)	𝛕 (U+1D6D5)	𝜏 (U+1D70F)	𝝉 (U+1D749)	𝞃 (U+1D783)	𝞽 (U+1D7BD)
Τ (U+03A4)	𝚻 (U+1D6BB)	𝛵 (U+1D6F5)	𝜯 (U+1D72F)	𝝩 (U+1D769)	𝞣 (U+1D7A3)

υ (U+03C5)	𝛖 (U+1D6D6)	𝜐 (U+1D710)	𝝊 (U+1D74A)	𝞄 (U+1D784)	𝞾 (U+1D7BE)
Υ (U+03A5)	ϒ (U+03D2)	𝚼 (U+1D6BC)	𝛶 (U+1D6F6)	𝜰 (U+1D730)	𝝪 (U+1D76A)
𝞤 (U+1D7A4)	ὐ (U+1F50)	ὔ (U+1F54)	ὒ (U+1F52)	ὖ (U+1F56)	ὑ (U+1F51)
Ὑ (U+1F59)	ὕ (U+1F55)	Ὕ (U+1F5D)	ὓ (U+1F53)	Ὓ (U+1F5B)	ὗ (U+1F57)
Ὗ (U+1F5F)	ύ (U+03CD)	ύ (U+1F7B)	Ύ (U+038E)	Ύ (U+1FEB)	ϓ (U+03D3)
ὺ (U+1F7A)	Ὺ (U+1FEA)	ῠ (U+1FE0)	Ῠ (U+1FE8)	ῦ (U+1FE6)	ϋ (U+03CB)
Ϋ (U+03AB)	ϔ (U+03D4)	ΰ (U+03B0)	ΰ (U+1FE3)	ῢ (U+1FE2)	ῧ (U+1FE7)
ῡ (U+1FE1)	Ῡ (U+1FE9)				

φ (U+03C6)	ϕ (U+03D5)	𝛗 (U+1D6D7)	𝛟 (U+1D6DF)	𝜑 (U+1D711)	𝜙 (U+1D719)
𝝋 (U+1D74B)	𝝓 (U+1D753)	𝞅 (U+1D785)	𝞍 (U+1D78D)	𝞿 (U+1D7BF)	𝟇 (U+1D7C7)
Φ (U+03A6)	𝚽 (U+1D6BD)	𝛷 (U+1D6F7)	𝜱 (U+1D731)	𝝫 (U+1D76B)	𝞥 (U+1D7A5)
ᵠ (U+1D60)	ᵩ (U+1D69)				

χ (U+03C7)	𝛘 (U+1D6D8)	𝜒 (U+1D712)	𝝌 (U+1D74C)	𝞆 (U+1D786)	𝟀 (U+1D7C0)
Χ (U+03A7)	𝚾 (U+1D6BE)	𝛸 (U+1D6F8)	𝜲 (U+1D732)	𝝬 (U+1D76C)	𝞦 (U+1D7A6)
ᵡ (U+1D61)	ᵪ (U+1D6A)				

ψ (U+03C8)	𝛙 (U+1D6D9)	𝜓 (U+1D713)	𝝍 (U+1D74D)	𝞇 (U+1D787)	𝟁 (U+1D7C1)
Ψ (U+03A8)	𝚿 (U+1D6BF)	𝛹 (U+1D6F9)	𝜳 (U+1D733)	𝝭 (U+1D76D)	𝞧 (U+1D7A7)
𝿳 (U+1DFF3)	ᴪ (U+1D2A)				

ω (U+03C9)	𝛚 (U+1D6DA)	𝜔 (U+1D714)	𝝎 (U+1D74E)	𝞈 (U+1D788)	𝟂 (U+1D7C2)
Ω (U+03A9)	Ω (U+2126)	ꭥ (U+AB65)	𝛀 (U+1D6C0)	𝛺 (U+1D6FA)	𝜴 (U+1D734)
𝝮 (U+1D76E)	𝞨 (U+1D7A8)	𝿴 (U+0DFF4)	ὠ (U+1F60)	Ὠ (U+1F68)	ὤ (U+1F64)
Ὤ (U+1F6C)	ᾤ (U+1FA4)	ᾬ (U+1FAC)	ὢ (U+1F62)	Ὢ (U+1F6A)	ᾢ (U+1FA2)
ᾪ (U+1FAA)	ὦ (U+1F66)	Ὦ (U+1F6E)	ᾦ (U+1FA6)	ᾮ (U+1FAE)	ᾠ (U+1FA0)
ᾨ (U+1FA8)	ὡ (U+1F61)	Ὡ (U+1F69)	ὥ (U+1F65)	Ὥ (U+1F6D)	ᾥ (U+1FA5)
ᾭ (U+1FAD)	ὣ (U+1F63)	Ὣ (U+1F6B)	ᾣ (U+1FA3)	ᾫ (U+1FAB)	ὧ (U+1F67)
Ὧ (U+1F6F)	ᾧ (U+1FA7)	ᾯ (U+1FAF)	ᾡ (U+1FA1)	ᾩ (U+1FA9)	ώ (U+03CE)
ώ (U+1F7D)	Ώ (U+038F)	Ώ (U+1FFB)	ῴ (U+1FF4)	ὼ (U+1F7C)	Ὼ (U+1FFA)
ῲ (U+1FF2)	ῶ (U+1FF6)	ῷ (U+1FF7)	ῳ (U+1FF3)	ῼ (U+1FFC)	ꭥ (U+AB65)

ϡ (U+03E1)	Ϡ (U+03E0)

ͳ (U+0373)	Ͳ (U+0372)

ϸ (U+03F8)	Ϸ (U+03F7)
