= Bloch function =

In mathematics, Bloch function may refer to:

- Named after Swiss physicist Felix Bloch
  - a periodic function which appears in the solution of the Schrödinger equation with periodic potential; see Bloch's theorem.
- Named after French mathematician André Bloch
  - an analytic function in the unit disc which is an element of the Bloch space.
