= Ancient Symbols (Unicode block) =

- Range: U+10190..U+101CF (64 code points)
- Plane: SMP
- Scripts: Greek (1 char.); Common (13 char.)
- Symbol sets: Roman weights and currency
- Assigned: 14 code points
- Unused: 50 reserved code points

Unicode version history
- 5.1 (2008): 12 (+12)
- 7.0 (2014): 13 (+1)
- 13.0 (2020): 14 (+1)

Unicode documentation
- Code chart ∣ Web page

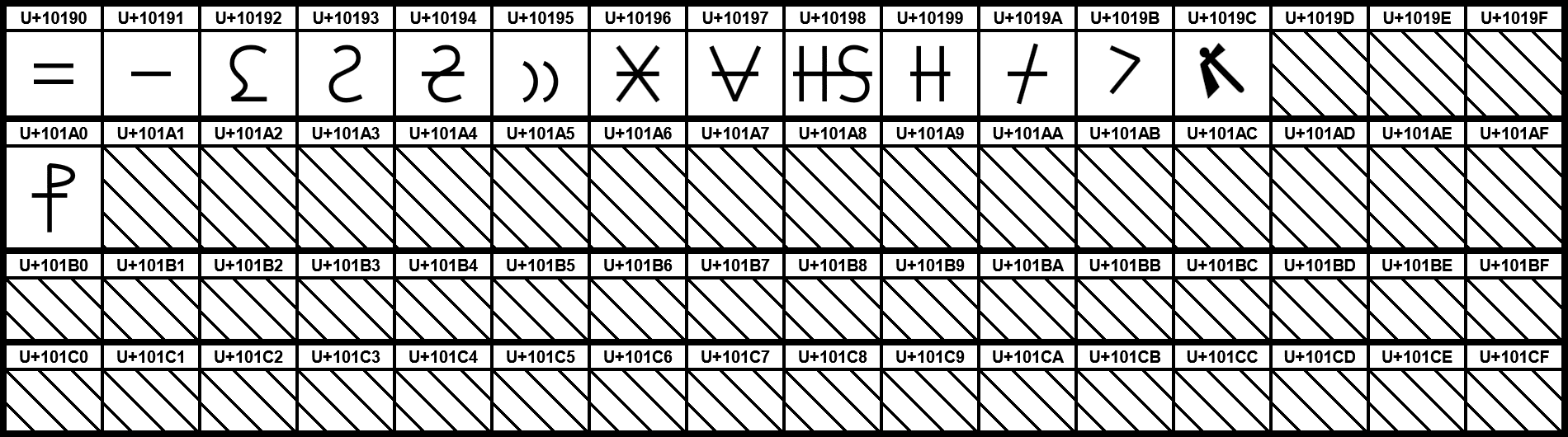
Graphical representation of the Ancient Symbols Unicode block

Ancient Symbols is a Unicode block containing Roman characters for currency, weights, and measures. It also contains the "GREEK SYMBOL TAU RHO" (tau rho or the staurogram (⳨)) at U+101A0.

== Block ==
Ancient Symbols^{[1]}^{[2]} Official Unicode Consortium code chart (PDF)
	0	1	2	3	4	5	6	7	8	9	A	B	C	D	E	F
U+1019x	𐆐	𐆑	𐆒	𐆓	𐆔	𐆕	𐆖	𐆗	𐆘	𐆙	𐆚	𐆛	𐆜			
U+101Ax	𐆠															
U+101Bx																
U+101Cx																
Notes: 1. As of Unicode version 17.0; 2. Grey areas indicate non-assigned code points

== History ==
The following Unicode-related documents record the purpose and process of defining specific characters in the Ancient Symbols block:

Version	Final code points (Note: Proposed code points and characters names may differ from final code points and names)	Count	L2 ID	WG2 ID	Document
5.1	U+10190..1019A	11	L2/06-173		Perry, David J. (2006-05-05), Proposal to Add Ancient Roman Weights and Monetary Signs to UCS
5.1	U+10190..1019A	11	L2/06-108		Moore, Lisa (2006-05-25), "C.21", UTC #107 Minutes
5.1	U+10190..1019A	11	L2/06-234		Perry, David J. (2006-07-30), Proposal to Add Ancient Roman Weights and Monetary Signs to UCS
5.1	U+10190..1019A	11		N3138	Perry, David J. (2006-07-30), Proposal to Add Ancient Roman Weights and Monetary Signs to UCS
5.1	U+10190..1019A	11	L2/06-231		Moore, Lisa (2006-08-17), "C.7", UTC #108 Minutes
5.1	U+10190..1019A	11		N3153 (pdf, doc)	Umamaheswaran, V. S. (2007-02-16), "M49.20", Unconfirmed minutes of WG 2 meeting 49 AIST, Akihabara, Tokyo, Japan; 2006-09-25/29
5.1	U+1019B	1	L2/06-269	N3218	Perry, David J. (2006-08-01), Proposal to Add Additional Ancient Roman Characters to UCS
5.1	U+1019B	1	L2/06-324R2		Moore, Lisa (2006-11-29), "Consensus 109-C33", UTC #109 Minutes
5.1	U+1019B	1	L2/07-268	N3253 (pdf, doc)	Umamaheswaran, V. S. (2007-07-26), "M50.24", Unconfirmed minutes of WG 2 meeting 50, Frankfurt-am-Main, Germany; 2007-04-24/27
7.0	U+101A0	1	L2/12-034	N4194	Sosin, Joshua; Heilporn, Paul; Hoogendijk, Cisca; Mastronarde, Donald; Hickey, Todd; Anderson, Deborah (2012-01-23), Proposal for three Greek papyrological characters
7.0	U+101A0	1	L2/12-007		Moore, Lisa (2012-02-14), "C.12", UTC #130 / L2 #227 Minutes
7.0	U+101A0	1		N4253 (pdf, doc)	"M59.16g", Unconfirmed minutes of WG 2 meeting 59, 2012-09-12
13.0	U+1019C	1	L2/19-091	N5038	West, Andrew; Everson, Michael (2019-03-25), Proposal to encode a pair of Ascia symbols for Roman epigraphy
13.0	U+1019C	1	L2/19-173		Anderson, Deborah; et al. (2019-04-29), "21", Recommendations to UTC #159 April-May 2019 on Script Proposals
13.0	U+1019C	1		N5122	"M68.10", Unconfirmed minutes of WG 2 meeting 68, 2019-12-31

== See also ==
- Greek script in Unicode
