= OT1 encoding =

TeX encoding for text and mathematical symbols

OT1 (aka TeX text) is a 7-bit TeX encoding developed by Donald E. Knuth.

== Character set ==
OT1
	0	1	2	3	4	5	6	7	8	9	A	B	C	D	E	F
0x	Γ	Δ	Θ	Λ	Ξ	Π	Σ	Υ	Φ	Ψ	Ω	ﬀ	ﬁ	ﬂ	ﬃ	ﬄ
1x	ı	ȷ	`	´	ˇ	˘	ˉ	˚	¸	ß	æ	œ	ø	Æ	Œ	Ø
2x	̷	!	”	#	$	%	&	’	(	)	*	+	,	-	.	/
3x	0	1	2	3	4	5	6	7	8	9	:	;	¡	=	¿	?
4x	@	A	B	C	D	E	F	G	H	I	J	K	L	M	N	O
5x	P	Q	R	S	T	U	V	W	X	Y	Z	[	“	]	ˆ	˙
6x	‘	a	b	c	d	e	f	g	h	i	j	k	l	m	n	o
7x	p	q	r	s	t	u	v	w	x	y	z	–	—	˝	˜	¨

== See also ==
- OML encoding
- OMS encoding
