= Samaritan source =

Symbol used in classical studies

Samaritan source (⅏) is a symbol used in classical studies to indicate that a referenced textual source is written with the Samaritan script. This character is encoded in Unicode as U+214F ⅏ SYMBOL FOR SAMARITAN SOURCE in the Letterlike Symbols block.
