= Turned g =

Letter of the Romanization of Hebrew

- ⅁ ᵷ

Usage
- Writing system: Latin script
- Type: alphabetic
- Language of origin: Tabasaran language, Karaim language, Kwakʼwala, multiple phonetic trascriptions
- Sound values: [ɣ]
- In Unicode: U+1D77

History
Development
(speculated origin)
  T14
          - Γ γ
            - 𐌂
              - C c
                - G g
                  - ⅁ ᵷ
- Time period: 1844, 1880, 1892-1921, 1900, 1929, 1959, 1965

Turned g (lowercase: ᵷ, mathematical symbol: ⅁) is a letter of the Latin alphabet, formed by rotating g 180°. It is used to transliterate the Georgian letter ჹ. ჹ itself is the Georgian letter გ "g" rotated.

== Usage ==
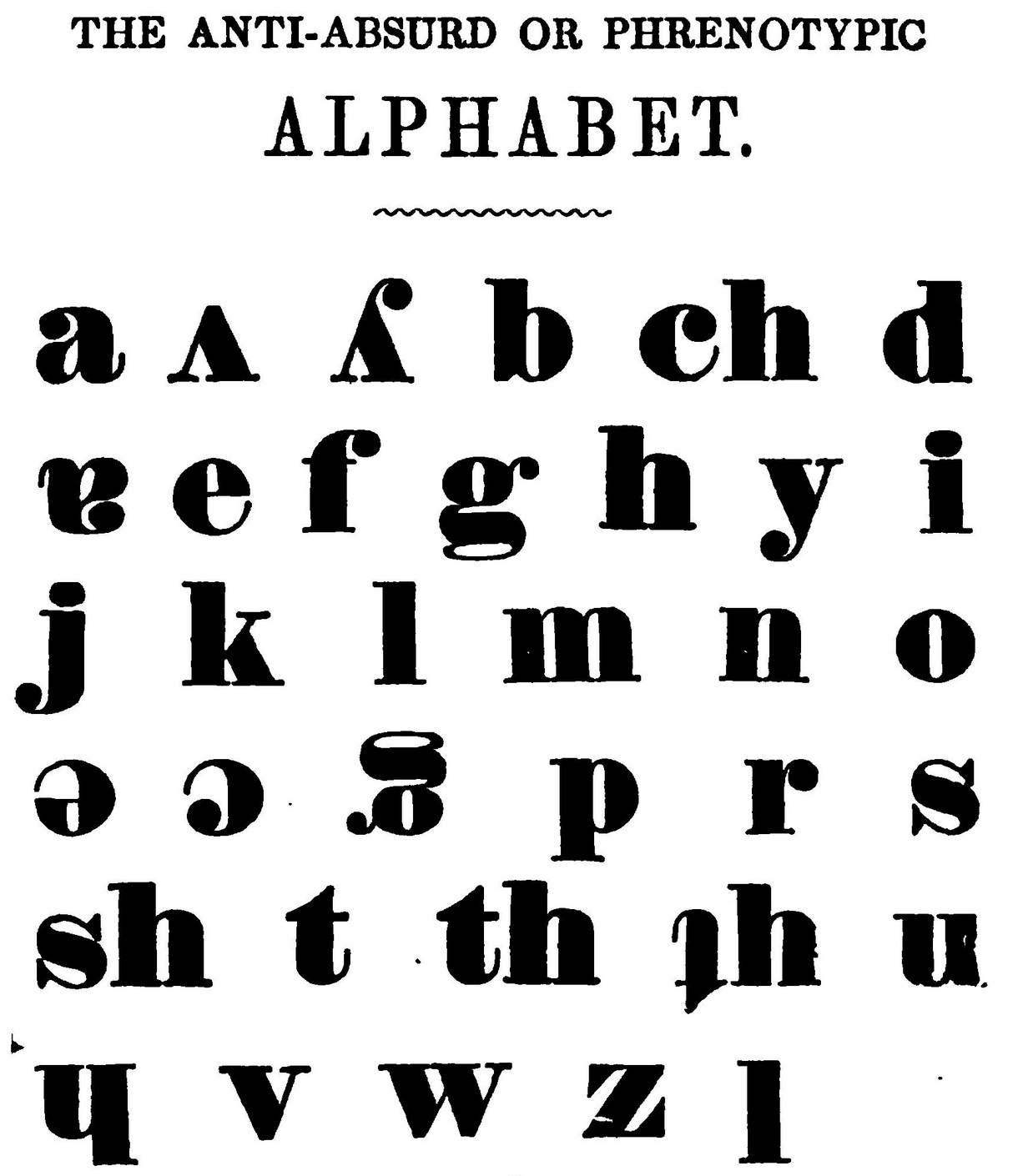
ᵷ in Beniowski's alphabet.

In 1844, Bartłomiej Beniowski created his Anti-Absurd or Phrenotypic Alphabet, featuring turned g for the diphthong [aʊ].

In 1880, John Wesley Powell created a phonetic transcription for transcribing Native American languages in publications of the Smithsonian Institution. In the transcriptions, turned letters were used as supplementary characters.

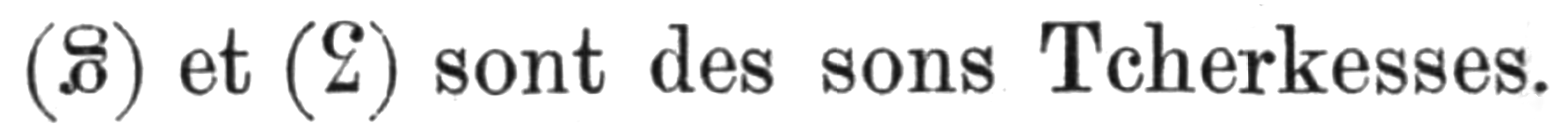
Turned g as a symbol in the early International Phonetic Alphabet.

In 1900, turned g was used as a phonetic symbol in the International Phonetic Association's Exposé des principes to represent a voiceless laminal closed postalveolar sibilant, as found in Adyghe and other Northwest Caucasian languages.

Franz Boas used turned g to represent the voiced velar fricative [ɣ] in his transcription of the Kwakʼwala language, published in American Anthropologist in 1900.

In 1921, Ivar Adolf Lyttkens and Fredrik Amadeus Wulff used turned g in their phonetic transcription, notably in Metodiska ljudöfningar published in 1892 or the dictionary Svensk ordlista published in 1921.

In 1929, Tadeusz Jan Kowalski used the turned g and turned k in Karaim language texts to represent an alveolar plosive pronounced as a velar plosive before the vowel [i]. Omeljan Pritsak reused this in a 1959 Karaim work.

Turned g represents a [ɢ] in the transcription of the Tabasaran language by Alexander Amarovich Magometov in his book Табасаранский язык: Исследование и тексты (Tabasaranskij jazyk: Issledovanie i teksty, “The Tabasaran language: analysis and texts”) published in 1965.

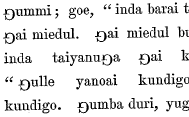
A 19th century Gamilaraay text, using a rotated capital G for ŋ.

A rotated capital G has sometimes been used as a substitute for the similar-looking eng [ŋ]. The capital has not been encoded in Unicode, but the character Turned sans serif capital G (⅁) U+2141 may look similar to it in sans serif fonts (when it is turned, not reversed).

== Computing codes ==
ᵷ was added to Unicode 4.1 in 2005, as U+1D77. Fonts that can display the character include Code2000, Doulos SIL and Charis SIL. Lowercase "b with hook" (ɓ), an IPA letter that resembles a turned one-story g, is more widely available as a substitute, at U+0253. The Turned sans serif capital G (⅁) U+2141 is not its uppercase, as it is intended to only be a mathematical sans serif symbol (like ∃ or ∀) for the game quantifier used by some authors.

Character information
Preview	⅁		ᵷ		𝼂	
Unicode name	TURNED SANS-SERIF CAPITAL G		LATIN SMALL LETTER TURNED G		LATIN LETTER SMALL CAPITAL TURNED G	
Encodings	decimal	hex	dec	hex	dec	hex
Unicode	8513	U+2141	7543	U+1D77	122626	U+1DF02
UTF-8	226 133 129	E2 85 81	225 181 183	E1 B5 B7	240 157 188 130	F0 9D BC 82
UTF-16	8513	2141	7543	1D77	55351 57090	D837 DF02
Numeric character reference	&#8513;	&#x2141;	&#7543;	&#x1D77;	&#122626;	&#x1DF02;
