= Modifier letter =

Character encoding standard

A modifier letter, in the Unicode Standard, is a letter or symbol typically written next to another letter that it modifies in some way.

They generally function like diacritics, changing the sound-values of the letter it is next to (usually the letter preceding it but sometimes the following letter instead). However, unlike diacritics, they do not combine with the character that they modify, but instead are displayed as separate characters on their own, such as subscripts or superscripts.

Like combining characters, they are often used in technical phonetic transcriptional systems to make phonetic distinctions.

== See also ==
- Spacing Modifier Letters
