= Per sign =

Symbol used to indicate a ratio

⅌o

Per sign
- In Unicode: U+214C ⅌ PER SIGN

Different from
- Different from: U+0025 % PERCENT SIGN (&percnt;)

Related
- See also: U+2030 ‰ PER MILLE SIGN; U+2031 ‱ PER TEN THOUSAND SIGN (Basis point)

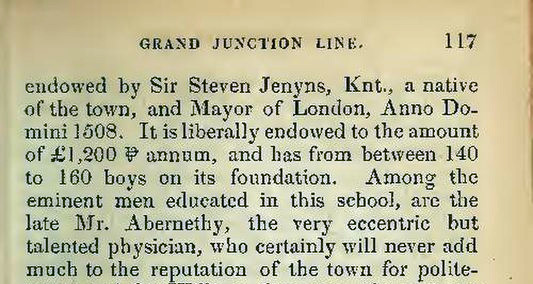
The symbol used in an English book from 1837

The per sign ⅌ is a rare symbol used to indicate a ratio. In English, it can replace the word "per" in phrases such as miles per hour ("miles ⅌ hour").

== Unicode ==
The Unicode code point is U+214C ⅌ PER SIGN. The symbol does not appear in the ASCII set.

== See also ==
- Wiktionary's entry on the symbol
