= Bloch space =

Space of holomorphic functions on the open unit disk in the complex plane

In the mathematical field of complex analysis, the Bloch space, named after French mathematician André Bloch and denoted $\mathcal{B}$ or ℬ, is the space of holomorphic functions f defined on the open unit disc D in the complex plane, such that the function

$$(1-|z|^2)|f^\prime(z)|$$

is bounded. $\mathcal{B}$ is a type of Banach space, with the norm defined by

$$\|f\|_\mathcal{B} = |f(0)| + \sup_{z \in \mathbf{D}} (1-|z|^2) |f'(z)|.$$

This is referred to as the Bloch norm and the elements of the Bloch space are called Bloch functions.
