= Mathematical Alphanumeric Symbols =

Unicode block U+1D400 until U+1D7FF

- Range: U+1D400..U+1D7FF (1,024 code points)
- Plane: SMP
- Scripts: Common
- Symbol sets: Mathematical
- Assigned: 997 code points
- Unused: 27 reserved code points

Unicode Version History
- 3.1 (2001): 991 (+991)
- 4.0 (2003): 992 (+1)
- 4.1 (2005): 994 (+2)
- 5.0 (2006): 996 (+2)
- 18.0 (2026): 997 (+1)

Unicode documentation
- Code chart ∣ Web page

Mathematical Alphanumeric Symbols is a Unicode block comprising styled forms of Latin and Greek letters and decimal digits that enable mathematicians to denote different notions with different letter styles. The letters in various fonts often have specific, fixed meanings in particular areas of mathematics. By providing uniformity over numerous mathematical articles and books, these conventions help to read mathematical formulas. These also may be used to differentiate between concepts that share a letter in a single problem.

Unicode includes many such symbols (in the range U+1D400–U+1D7FF). The rationale behind this is that it enables design and usage of special mathematical characters (fonts) that include all necessary properties to differentiate from other alphanumerics, e.g. in mathematics an italic letter "A" can have a different meaning from a roman letter "A". Unicode originally included a limited set of such letter forms in its Letterlike Symbols block before completing the set of Latin and Greek letter forms in this block beginning in version 3.1.

Unicode expressly recommends that these characters not be used in general text as a substitute for presentational markup; the letters are specifically designed to be semantically different from each other. Unicode does not include a set of normal serif letters in the set. (Note: Unicode thus assumes a given font is a serif by default; a sans-serif font that supports the range would thus display the standard letters and the "sans-serif" symbols identically but could not display normal serif symbols of the same.) Still they have found some usage on social media, for example by people who want a stylized user name, and in email spam, in an attempt to bypass filters.

All these letter shapes may be manipulated with MathML's attribute mathvariant.

The introduction date of some of the more commonly used symbols can be found in the Table of mathematical symbols by introduction date.

== Tables of styled letters and digits ==
These tables show all styled forms of Latin and Greek letters, symbols, and digits in the Unicode Standard.

The first column labelled as "serif normal" is in fact non-symbol letters from the BMP. These will not have serifs if the font is non-serif, this table selects a serif font for them.

In most cases the code point is the sum of the index number on the left and the number at the top of the column. Pink and yellow cells and '-' index indicates this rule does not apply.

=== Latin letters ===
The 24 characters with pink backgrounds are not in the Mathematical Alphanumeric Symbols block, but instead in the BMP letterlike symbols block, for example, ℛ (script capital r) is at U+211B rather than the expected U+1D4AD which is reserved. In the code charts for the Unicode Standard, the reserved code points corresponding to the pink cell are annotated with the name and code point of the correct character. There are a few characters which have names that suggest that they should belong in the tables below, but in fact do not because their official character names are misnomers:

- U+2113 ℓ SCRIPT SMALL L; "despite its character name, this symbol is derived from a special italicized version of the small letter l". It has various other specialized uses, such as a liter symbol and as the azimuthal quantum number symbol.
- U+2118 ℘ SCRIPT CAPITAL P is a symbol for Weierstrass's elliptic function. It is officially aliased as U+2118 ℘ WEIERSTRASS ELLIPTIC FUNCTION.

Latin capital letters
	Serif				Sans-serif				Script (or calligraphy)		Fraktur		Mono- space	Double- struck
	Normal	Bold	Italic	Bold italic	Normal	Bold	Italic	Bold italic	Normal	Bold	Normal	Bold	Normal	Bold
U+	0041	1D400	1D434	1D468	1D5A0	1D5D4	1D608	1D63C	1D49C	1D4D0	1D504	1D56C	1D670	1D538
00	A	𝐀	𝐴	𝑨	𝖠	𝗔	𝘈	𝘼	𝒜	𝓐	𝔄	𝕬	𝙰	𝔸
01	B	𝐁	𝐵	𝑩	𝖡	𝗕	𝘉	𝘽	ℬ	𝓑	𝔅	𝕭	𝙱	𝔹
02	C	𝐂	𝐶	𝑪	𝖢	𝗖	𝘊	𝘾	𝒞	𝓒	ℭ	𝕮	𝙲	ℂ
03	D	𝐃	𝐷	𝑫	𝖣	𝗗	𝘋	𝘿	𝒟	𝓓	𝔇	𝕯	𝙳	𝔻
04	E	𝐄	𝐸	𝑬	𝖤	𝗘	𝘌	𝙀	ℰ	𝓔	𝔈	𝕰	𝙴	𝔼
05	F	𝐅	𝐹	𝑭	𝖥	𝗙	𝘍	𝙁	ℱ	𝓕	𝔉	𝕱	𝙵	𝔽
06	G	𝐆	𝐺	𝑮	𝖦	𝗚	𝘎	𝙂	𝒢	𝓖	𝔊	𝕲	𝙶	𝔾
07	H	𝐇	𝐻	𝑯	𝖧	𝗛	𝘏	𝙃	ℋ	𝓗	ℌ	𝕳	𝙷	ℍ
08	I	𝐈	𝐼	𝑰	𝖨	𝗜	𝘐	𝙄	ℐ	𝓘	ℑ	𝕴	𝙸	𝕀
09	J	𝐉	𝐽	𝑱	𝖩	𝗝	𝘑	𝙅	𝒥	𝓙	𝔍	𝕵	𝙹	𝕁
0A	K	𝐊	𝐾	𝑲	𝖪	𝗞	𝘒	𝙆	𝒦	𝓚	𝔎	𝕶	𝙺	𝕂
0B	L	𝐋	𝐿	𝑳	𝖫	𝗟	𝘓	𝙇	ℒ	𝓛	𝔏	𝕷	𝙻	𝕃
0C	M	𝐌	𝑀	𝑴	𝖬	𝗠	𝘔	𝙈	ℳ	𝓜	𝔐	𝕸	𝙼	𝕄
0D	N	𝐍	𝑁	𝑵	𝖭	𝗡	𝘕	𝙉	𝒩	𝓝	𝔑	𝕹	𝙽	ℕ
0E	O	𝐎	𝑂	𝑶	𝖮	𝗢	𝘖	𝙊	𝒪	𝓞	𝔒	𝕺	𝙾	𝕆
0F	P	𝐏	𝑃	𝑷	𝖯	𝗣	𝘗	𝙋	𝒫	𝓟	𝔓	𝕻	𝙿	ℙ
10	Q	𝐐	𝑄	𝑸	𝖰	𝗤	𝘘	𝙌	𝒬	𝓠	𝔔	𝕼	𝚀	ℚ
11	R	𝐑	𝑅	𝑹	𝖱	𝗥	𝘙	𝙍	ℛ	𝓡	ℜ	𝕽	𝚁	ℝ
12	S	𝐒	𝑆	𝑺	𝖲	𝗦	𝘚	𝙎	𝒮	𝓢	𝔖	𝕾	𝚂	𝕊
13	T	𝐓	𝑇	𝑻	𝖳	𝗧	𝘛	𝙏	𝒯	𝓣	𝔗	𝕿	𝚃	𝕋
14	U	𝐔	𝑈	𝑼	𝖴	𝗨	𝘜	𝙐	𝒰	𝓤	𝔘	𝖀	𝚄	𝕌
15	V	𝐕	𝑉	𝑽	𝖵	𝗩	𝘝	𝙑	𝒱	𝓥	𝔙	𝖁	𝚅	𝕍
16	W	𝐖	𝑊	𝑾	𝖶	𝗪	𝘞	𝙒	𝒲	𝓦	𝔚	𝖂	𝚆	𝕎
17	X	𝐗	𝑋	𝑿	𝖷	𝗫	𝘟	𝙓	𝒳	𝓧	𝔛	𝖃	𝚇	𝕏
18	Y	𝐘	𝑌	𝒀	𝖸	𝗬	𝘠	𝙔	𝒴	𝓨	𝔜	𝖄	𝚈	𝕐
19	Z	𝐙	𝑍	𝒁	𝖹	𝗭	𝘡	𝙕	𝒵	𝓩	ℨ	𝖅	𝚉	ℤ

Latin small letters
	Basic form				Sans-serif				Script (or calligraphy)		Fraktur		Mono- space	Double- struck
	Normal	Bold	Italic	Bold italic	Normal	Bold	Italic	Bold italic	Normal	Bold	Normal	Bold	Normal	Bold
U+	0061	1D41A	1D44E	1D482	1D5BA	1D5EE	1D622	1D656	1D4B6	1D4EA	1D51E	1D586	1D68A	1D552
00	a	𝐚	𝑎	𝒂	𝖺	𝗮	𝘢	𝙖	𝒶	𝓪	𝔞	𝖆	𝚊	𝕒
01	b	𝐛	𝑏	𝒃	𝖻	𝗯	𝘣	𝙗	𝒷	𝓫	𝔟	𝖇	𝚋	𝕓
02	c	𝐜	𝑐	𝒄	𝖼	𝗰	𝘤	𝙘	𝒸	𝓬	𝔠	𝖈	𝚌	𝕔
03	d	𝐝	𝑑	𝒅	𝖽	𝗱	𝘥	𝙙	𝒹	𝓭	𝔡	𝖉	𝚍	𝕕
04	e	𝐞	𝑒	𝒆	𝖾	𝗲	𝘦	𝙚	ℯ	𝓮	𝔢	𝖊	𝚎	𝕖
05	f	𝐟	𝑓	𝒇	𝖿	𝗳	𝘧	𝙛	𝒻	𝓯	𝔣	𝖋	𝚏	𝕗
06	g	𝐠	𝑔	𝒈	𝗀	𝗴	𝘨	𝙜	ℊ	𝓰	𝔤	𝖌	𝚐	𝕘
07	h	𝐡	ℎ	𝒉	𝗁	𝗵	𝘩	𝙝	𝒽	𝓱	𝔥	𝖍	𝚑	𝕙
08	i	𝐢	𝑖	𝒊	𝗂	𝗶	𝘪	𝙞	𝒾	𝓲	𝔦	𝖎	𝚒	𝕚
09	j	𝐣	𝑗	𝒋	𝗃	𝗷	𝘫	𝙟	𝒿	𝓳	𝔧	𝖏	𝚓	𝕛
0A	k	𝐤	𝑘	𝒌	𝗄	𝗸	𝘬	𝙠	𝓀	𝓴	𝔨	𝖐	𝚔	𝕜
0B	l	𝐥	𝑙	𝒍	𝗅	𝗹	𝘭	𝙡	𝓁	𝓵	𝔩	𝖑	𝚕	𝕝
0C	m	𝐦	𝑚	𝒎	𝗆	𝗺	𝘮	𝙢	𝓂	𝓶	𝔪	𝖒	𝚖	𝕞
0D	n	𝐧	𝑛	𝒏	𝗇	𝗻	𝘯	𝙣	𝓃	𝓷	𝔫	𝖓	𝚗	𝕟
0E	o	𝐨	𝑜	𝒐	𝗈	𝗼	𝘰	𝙤	ℴ	𝓸	𝔬	𝖔	𝚘	𝕠
0F	p	𝐩	𝑝	𝒑	𝗉	𝗽	𝘱	𝙥	𝓅	𝓹	𝔭	𝖕	𝚙	𝕡
10	q	𝐪	𝑞	𝒒	𝗊	𝗾	𝘲	𝙦	𝓆	𝓺	𝔮	𝖖	𝚚	𝕢
11	r	𝐫	𝑟	𝒓	𝗋	𝗿	𝘳	𝙧	𝓇	𝓻	𝔯	𝖗	𝚛	𝕣
12	s	𝐬	𝑠	𝒔	𝗌	𝘀	𝘴	𝙨	𝓈	𝓼	𝔰	𝖘	𝚜	𝕤
13	t	𝐭	𝑡	𝒕	𝗍	𝘁	𝘵	𝙩	𝓉	𝓽	𝔱	𝖙	𝚝	𝕥
14	u	𝐮	𝑢	𝒖	𝗎	𝘂	𝘶	𝙪	𝓊	𝓾	𝔲	𝖚	𝚞	𝕦
15	v	𝐯	𝑣	𝒗	𝗏	𝘃	𝘷	𝙫	𝓋	𝓿	𝔳	𝖛	𝚟	𝕧
16	w	𝐰	𝑤	𝒘	𝗐	𝘄	𝘸	𝙬	𝓌	𝔀	𝔴	𝖜	𝚠	𝕨
17	x	𝐱	𝑥	𝒙	𝗑	𝘅	𝘹	𝙭	𝓍	𝔁	𝔵	𝖝	𝚡	𝕩
18	y	𝐲	𝑦	𝒚	𝗒	𝘆	𝘺	𝙮	𝓎	𝔂	𝔶	𝖞	𝚢	𝕪
19	z	𝐳	𝑧	𝒛	𝗓	𝘇	𝘻	𝙯	𝓏	𝔃	𝔷	𝖟	𝚣	𝕫
–	ı		𝚤											
–	ȷ		𝚥											

=== Greek letters and symbols ===
Greek capital letters
	Serif				Sans-serif	
	Normal	Bold	Italic	Bold italic	Bold	Bold italic
U+	0391	1D6A8	1D6E2	1D71C	1D756	1D790
00	Α	𝚨	𝛢	𝜜	𝝖	𝞐
01	Β	𝚩	𝛣	𝜝	𝝗	𝞑
02	Γ	𝚪	𝛤	𝜞	𝝘	𝞒
03	Δ	𝚫	𝛥	𝜟	𝝙	𝞓
04	Ε	𝚬	𝛦	𝜠	𝝚	𝞔
05	Ζ	𝚭	𝛧	𝜡	𝝛	𝞕
06	Η	𝚮	𝛨	𝜢	𝝜	𝞖
07	Θ	𝚯	𝛩	𝜣	𝝝	𝞗
08	Ι	𝚰	𝛪	𝜤	𝝞	𝞘
09	Κ	𝚱	𝛫	𝜥	𝝟	𝞙
0A	Λ	𝚲	𝛬	𝜦	𝝠	𝞚
0B	Μ	𝚳	𝛭	𝜧	𝝡	𝞛
0C	Ν	𝚴	𝛮	𝜨	𝝢	𝞜
0D	Ξ	𝚵	𝛯	𝜩	𝝣	𝞝
0E	Ο	𝚶	𝛰	𝜪	𝝤	𝞞
0F	Π	𝚷	𝛱	𝜫	𝝥	𝞟
10	Ρ	𝚸	𝛲	𝜬	𝝦	𝞠
11	ϴ	𝚹	𝛳	𝜭	𝝧	𝞡
12	Σ	𝚺	𝛴	𝜮	𝝨	𝞢
13	Τ	𝚻	𝛵	𝜯	𝝩	𝞣
14	Υ	𝚼	𝛶	𝜰	𝝪	𝞤
15	Φ	𝚽	𝛷	𝜱	𝝫	𝞥
16	Χ	𝚾	𝛸	𝜲	𝝬	𝞦
17	Ψ	𝚿	𝛹	𝜳	𝝭	𝞧
18	Ω	𝛀	𝛺	𝜴	𝝮	𝞨
19	∇	𝛁	𝛻	𝜵	𝝯	𝞩
–	Ϝ	𝟊				

Greek small letters
	Serif				Sans-serif	
	Normal	Bold	Italic	Bold italic	Bold	Bold italic
U+	03B1	1D6C2	1D6FC	1D736	1D770	1D7AA
00	α	𝛂	𝛼	𝜶	𝝰	𝞪
01	β	𝛃	𝛽	𝜷	𝝱	𝞫
02	γ	𝛄	𝛾	𝜸	𝝲	𝞬
03	δ	𝛅	𝛿	𝜹	𝝳	𝞭
04	ε	𝛆	𝜀	𝜺	𝝴	𝞮
05	ζ	𝛇	𝜁	𝜻	𝝵	𝞯
06	η	𝛈	𝜂	𝜼	𝝶	𝞰
07	θ	𝛉	𝜃	𝜽	𝝷	𝞱
08	ι	𝛊	𝜄	𝜾	𝝸	𝞲
09	κ	𝛋	𝜅	𝜿	𝝹	𝞳
0A	λ	𝛌	𝜆	𝝀	𝝺	𝞴
0B	μ	𝛍	𝜇	𝝁	𝝻	𝞵
0C	ν	𝛎	𝜈	𝝂	𝝼	𝞶
0D	ξ	𝛏	𝜉	𝝃	𝝽	𝞷
0E	ο	𝛐	𝜊	𝝄	𝝾	𝞸
0F	π	𝛑	𝜋	𝝅	𝝿	𝞹
10	ρ	𝛒	𝜌	𝝆	𝞀	𝞺
11	ς	𝛓	𝜍	𝝇	𝞁	𝞻
12	σ	𝛔	𝜎	𝝈	𝞂	𝞼
13	τ	𝛕	𝜏	𝝉	𝞃	𝞽
14	υ	𝛖	𝜐	𝝊	𝞄	𝞾
15	φ	𝛗	𝜑	𝝋	𝞅	𝞿
16	χ	𝛘	𝜒	𝝌	𝞆	𝟀
17	ψ	𝛙	𝜓	𝝍	𝞇	𝟁
18	ω	𝛚	𝜔	𝝎	𝞈	𝟂
19	∂	𝛛	𝜕	𝝏	𝞉	𝟃
1A	ϵ	𝛜	𝜖	𝝐	𝞊	𝟄
1B	ϑ	𝛝	𝜗	𝝑	𝞋	𝟅
1C	ϰ	𝛞	𝜘	𝝒	𝞌	𝟆
1D	ϕ	𝛟	𝜙	𝝓	𝞍	𝟇
1E	ϱ	𝛠	𝜚	𝝔	𝞎	𝟈
1F	ϖ	𝛡	𝜛	𝝕	𝞏	𝟉
–	ϝ	𝟋				

=== Digits ===
	Normal	Bold	Double- struck	Sans- serif	Sans- serif bold	Mono- space
U+	0030	1D7CE	1D7D8	1D7E2	1D7EC	1D7F6
0	0	𝟎	𝟘	𝟢	𝟬	𝟶
1	1	𝟏	𝟙	𝟣	𝟭	𝟷
2	2	𝟐	𝟚	𝟤	𝟮	𝟸
3	3	𝟑	𝟛	𝟥	𝟯	𝟹
4	4	𝟒	𝟜	𝟦	𝟰	𝟺
5	5	𝟓	𝟝	𝟧	𝟱	𝟻
6	6	𝟔	𝟞	𝟨	𝟲	𝟼
7	7	𝟕	𝟟	𝟩	𝟳	𝟽
8	8	𝟖	𝟠	𝟪	𝟴	𝟾
9	9	𝟗	𝟡	𝟫	𝟵	𝟿

=== Glyph variants ===
Variation selectors may be used to specify chancery (U+FE00) vs roundhand (U+FE01) forms, if a computer font is available that supports them:

Code point	Plain	FE00	FE01
U+1D49C	𝒜	𝒜︀	𝒜︁
U+212C	ℬ	ℬ︀	ℬ︁
U+1D49E	𝒞	𝒞︀	𝒞︁
U+1D49F	𝒟	𝒟︀	𝒟︁
U+2130	ℰ	ℰ︀	ℰ︁
U+2131	ℱ	ℱ︀	ℱ︁
U+1D4A2	𝒢	𝒢︀	𝒢︁
U+210B	ℋ	ℋ︀	ℋ︁
U+2110	ℐ	ℐ︀	ℐ︁
U+1D4A5	𝒥	𝒥︀	𝒥︁
U+1D4A6	𝒦	𝒦︀	𝒦︁
U+2112	ℒ	ℒ︀	ℒ︁
U+2133	ℳ	ℳ︀	ℳ︁
U+1D4A9	𝒩	𝒩︀	𝒩︁
U+1D4AA	𝒪	𝒪︀	𝒪︁
U+1D4AB	𝒫	𝒫︀	𝒫︁
U+1D4AC	𝒬	𝒬︀	𝒬︁
U+211B	ℛ	ℛ︀	ℛ︁
U+1D4AE	𝒮	𝒮︀	𝒮︁
U+1D4AF	𝒯	𝒯︀	𝒯︁
U+1D4B0	𝒰	𝒰︀	𝒰︁
U+1D4B1	𝒱	𝒱︀	𝒱︁
U+1D4B2	𝒲	𝒲︀	𝒲︁
U+1D4B3	𝒳	𝒳︀	𝒳︁
U+1D4B4	𝒴	𝒴︀	𝒴︁
U+1D4B5	𝒵	𝒵︀	𝒵︁

Kurrent style can be specified using variation selector VS03 (U+FE02), if a computer font is available that supports it:

Variation sequences
Base character	Base	+VS03	Description
U+1D4CF MATHEMATICAL SCRIPT SMALL Z	𝓏	𝓏︂	kurrent style

== Chart for the Mathematical Alphanumeric Symbols block ==
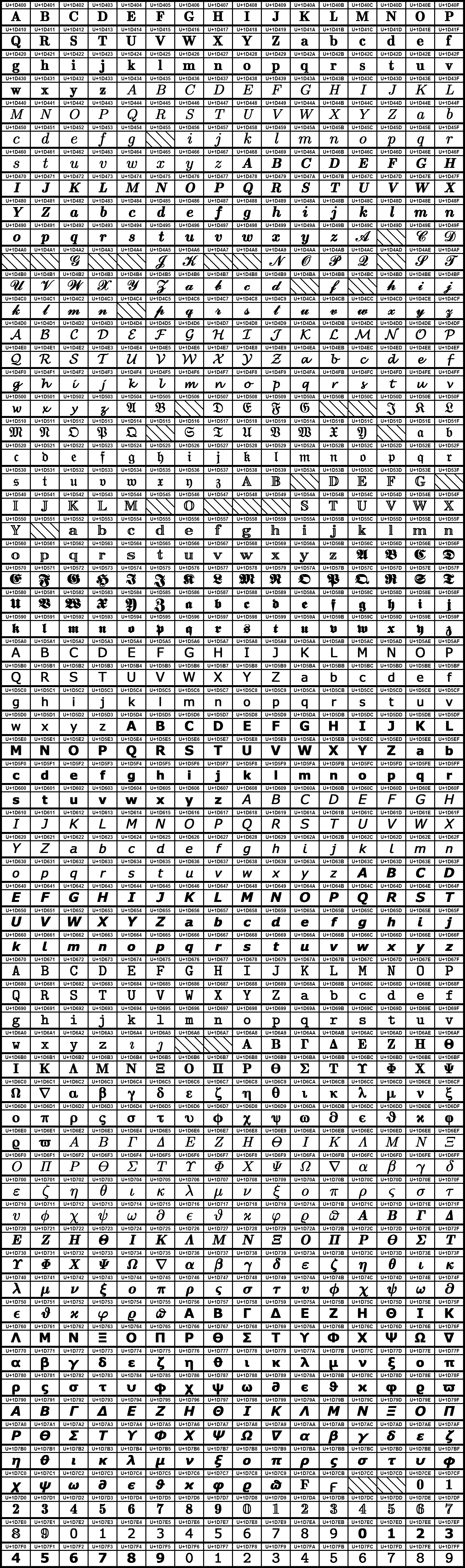
Image of the Mathematical Alphanumeric Symbols Unicode block

Mathematical Alphanumeric Symbols^{[1]}^{[2]} Official Unicode Consortium code chart (PDF)
	0	1	2	3	4	5	6	7	8	9	A	B	C	D	E	F
U+1D40x	𝐀	𝐁	𝐂	𝐃	𝐄	𝐅	𝐆	𝐇	𝐈	𝐉	𝐊	𝐋	𝐌	𝐍	𝐎	𝐏
U+1D41x	𝐐	𝐑	𝐒	𝐓	𝐔	𝐕	𝐖	𝐗	𝐘	𝐙	𝐚	𝐛	𝐜	𝐝	𝐞	𝐟
U+1D42x	𝐠	𝐡	𝐢	𝐣	𝐤	𝐥	𝐦	𝐧	𝐨	𝐩	𝐪	𝐫	𝐬	𝐭	𝐮	𝐯
U+1D43x	𝐰	𝐱	𝐲	𝐳	𝐴	𝐵	𝐶	𝐷	𝐸	𝐹	𝐺	𝐻	𝐼	𝐽	𝐾	𝐿
U+1D44x	𝑀	𝑁	𝑂	𝑃	𝑄	𝑅	𝑆	𝑇	𝑈	𝑉	𝑊	𝑋	𝑌	𝑍	𝑎	𝑏
U+1D45x	𝑐	𝑑	𝑒	𝑓	𝑔		𝑖	𝑗	𝑘	𝑙	𝑚	𝑛	𝑜	𝑝	𝑞	𝑟
U+1D46x	𝑠	𝑡	𝑢	𝑣	𝑤	𝑥	𝑦	𝑧	𝑨	𝑩	𝑪	𝑫	𝑬	𝑭	𝑮	𝑯
U+1D47x	𝑰	𝑱	𝑲	𝑳	𝑴	𝑵	𝑶	𝑷	𝑸	𝑹	𝑺	𝑻	𝑼	𝑽	𝑾	𝑿
U+1D48x	𝒀	𝒁	𝒂	𝒃	𝒄	𝒅	𝒆	𝒇	𝒈	𝒉	𝒊	𝒋	𝒌	𝒍	𝒎	𝒏
U+1D49x	𝒐	𝒑	𝒒	𝒓	𝒔	𝒕	𝒖	𝒗	𝒘	𝒙	𝒚	𝒛	𝒜		𝒞	𝒟
U+1D4Ax			𝒢			𝒥	𝒦			𝒩	𝒪	𝒫	𝒬		𝒮	𝒯
U+1D4Bx	𝒰	𝒱	𝒲	𝒳	𝒴	𝒵	𝒶	𝒷	𝒸	𝒹		𝒻		𝒽	𝒾	𝒿
U+1D4Cx	𝓀	𝓁	𝓂	𝓃		𝓅	𝓆	𝓇	𝓈	𝓉	𝓊	𝓋	𝓌	𝓍	𝓎	𝓏
U+1D4Dx	𝓐	𝓑	𝓒	𝓓	𝓔	𝓕	𝓖	𝓗	𝓘	𝓙	𝓚	𝓛	𝓜	𝓝	𝓞	𝓟
U+1D4Ex	𝓠	𝓡	𝓢	𝓣	𝓤	𝓥	𝓦	𝓧	𝓨	𝓩	𝓪	𝓫	𝓬	𝓭	𝓮	𝓯
U+1D4Fx	𝓰	𝓱	𝓲	𝓳	𝓴	𝓵	𝓶	𝓷	𝓸	𝓹	𝓺	𝓻	𝓼	𝓽	𝓾	𝓿
U+1D50x	𝔀	𝔁	𝔂	𝔃	𝔄	𝔅		𝔇	𝔈	𝔉	𝔊			𝔍	𝔎	𝔏
U+1D51x	𝔐	𝔑	𝔒	𝔓	𝔔		𝔖	𝔗	𝔘	𝔙	𝔚	𝔛	𝔜		𝔞	𝔟
U+1D52x	𝔠	𝔡	𝔢	𝔣	𝔤	𝔥	𝔦	𝔧	𝔨	𝔩	𝔪	𝔫	𝔬	𝔭	𝔮	𝔯
U+1D53x	𝔰	𝔱	𝔲	𝔳	𝔴	𝔵	𝔶	𝔷	𝔸	𝔹		𝔻	𝔼	𝔽	𝔾	
U+1D54x	𝕀	𝕁	𝕂	𝕃	𝕄		𝕆				𝕊	𝕋	𝕌	𝕍	𝕎	𝕏
U+1D55x	𝕐		𝕒	𝕓	𝕔	𝕕	𝕖	𝕗	𝕘	𝕙	𝕚	𝕛	𝕜	𝕝	𝕞	𝕟
U+1D56x	𝕠	𝕡	𝕢	𝕣	𝕤	𝕥	𝕦	𝕧	𝕨	𝕩	𝕪	𝕫	𝕬	𝕭	𝕮	𝕯
U+1D57x	𝕰	𝕱	𝕲	𝕳	𝕴	𝕵	𝕶	𝕷	𝕸	𝕹	𝕺	𝕻	𝕼	𝕽	𝕾	𝕿
U+1D58x	𝖀	𝖁	𝖂	𝖃	𝖄	𝖅	𝖆	𝖇	𝖈	𝖉	𝖊	𝖋	𝖌	𝖍	𝖎	𝖏
U+1D59x	𝖐	𝖑	𝖒	𝖓	𝖔	𝖕	𝖖	𝖗	𝖘	𝖙	𝖚	𝖛	𝖜	𝖝	𝖞	𝖟
U+1D5Ax	𝖠	𝖡	𝖢	𝖣	𝖤	𝖥	𝖦	𝖧	𝖨	𝖩	𝖪	𝖫	𝖬	𝖭	𝖮	𝖯
U+1D5Bx	𝖰	𝖱	𝖲	𝖳	𝖴	𝖵	𝖶	𝖷	𝖸	𝖹	𝖺	𝖻	𝖼	𝖽	𝖾	𝖿
U+1D5Cx	𝗀	𝗁	𝗂	𝗃	𝗄	𝗅	𝗆	𝗇	𝗈	𝗉	𝗊	𝗋	𝗌	𝗍	𝗎	𝗏
U+1D5Dx	𝗐	𝗑	𝗒	𝗓	𝗔	𝗕	𝗖	𝗗	𝗘	𝗙	𝗚	𝗛	𝗜	𝗝	𝗞	𝗟
U+1D5Ex	𝗠	𝗡	𝗢	𝗣	𝗤	𝗥	𝗦	𝗧	𝗨	𝗩	𝗪	𝗫	𝗬	𝗭	𝗮	𝗯
U+1D5Fx	𝗰	𝗱	𝗲	𝗳	𝗴	𝗵	𝗶	𝗷	𝗸	𝗹	𝗺	𝗻	𝗼	𝗽	𝗾	𝗿
U+1D60x	𝘀	𝘁	𝘂	𝘃	𝘄	𝘅	𝘆	𝘇	𝘈	𝘉	𝘊	𝘋	𝘌	𝘍	𝘎	𝘏
U+1D61x	𝘐	𝘑	𝘒	𝘓	𝘔	𝘕	𝘖	𝘗	𝘘	𝘙	𝘚	𝘛	𝘜	𝘝	𝘞	𝘟
U+1D62x	𝘠	𝘡	𝘢	𝘣	𝘤	𝘥	𝘦	𝘧	𝘨	𝘩	𝘪	𝘫	𝘬	𝘭	𝘮	𝘯
U+1D63x	𝘰	𝘱	𝘲	𝘳	𝘴	𝘵	𝘶	𝘷	𝘸	𝘹	𝘺	𝘻	𝘼	𝘽	𝘾	𝘿
U+1D64x	𝙀	𝙁	𝙂	𝙃	𝙄	𝙅	𝙆	𝙇	𝙈	𝙉	𝙊	𝙋	𝙌	𝙍	𝙎	𝙏
U+1D65x	𝙐	𝙑	𝙒	𝙓	𝙔	𝙕	𝙖	𝙗	𝙘	𝙙	𝙚	𝙛	𝙜	𝙝	𝙞	𝙟
U+1D66x	𝙠	𝙡	𝙢	𝙣	𝙤	𝙥	𝙦	𝙧	𝙨	𝙩	𝙪	𝙫	𝙬	𝙭	𝙮	𝙯
U+1D67x	𝙰	𝙱	𝙲	𝙳	𝙴	𝙵	𝙶	𝙷	𝙸	𝙹	𝙺	𝙻	𝙼	𝙽	𝙾	𝙿
U+1D68x	𝚀	𝚁	𝚂	𝚃	𝚄	𝚅	𝚆	𝚇	𝚈	𝚉	𝚊	𝚋	𝚌	𝚍	𝚎	𝚏
U+1D69x	𝚐	𝚑	𝚒	𝚓	𝚔	𝚕	𝚖	𝚗	𝚘	𝚙	𝚚	𝚛	𝚜	𝚝	𝚞	𝚟
U+1D6Ax	𝚠	𝚡	𝚢	𝚣	𝚤	𝚥	𝚦		𝚨	𝚩	𝚪	𝚫	𝚬	𝚭	𝚮	𝚯
U+1D6Bx	𝚰	𝚱	𝚲	𝚳	𝚴	𝚵	𝚶	𝚷	𝚸	𝚹	𝚺	𝚻	𝚼	𝚽	𝚾	𝚿
U+1D6Cx	𝛀	𝛁	𝛂	𝛃	𝛄	𝛅	𝛆	𝛇	𝛈	𝛉	𝛊	𝛋	𝛌	𝛍	𝛎	𝛏
U+1D6Dx	𝛐	𝛑	𝛒	𝛓	𝛔	𝛕	𝛖	𝛗	𝛘	𝛙	𝛚	𝛛	𝛜	𝛝	𝛞	𝛟
U+1D6Ex	𝛠	𝛡	𝛢	𝛣	𝛤	𝛥	𝛦	𝛧	𝛨	𝛩	𝛪	𝛫	𝛬	𝛭	𝛮	𝛯
U+1D6Fx	𝛰	𝛱	𝛲	𝛳	𝛴	𝛵	𝛶	𝛷	𝛸	𝛹	𝛺	𝛻	𝛼	𝛽	𝛾	𝛿
U+1D70x	𝜀	𝜁	𝜂	𝜃	𝜄	𝜅	𝜆	𝜇	𝜈	𝜉	𝜊	𝜋	𝜌	𝜍	𝜎	𝜏
U+1D71x	𝜐	𝜑	𝜒	𝜓	𝜔	𝜕	𝜖	𝜗	𝜘	𝜙	𝜚	𝜛	𝜜	𝜝	𝜞	𝜟
U+1D72x	𝜠	𝜡	𝜢	𝜣	𝜤	𝜥	𝜦	𝜧	𝜨	𝜩	𝜪	𝜫	𝜬	𝜭	𝜮	𝜯
U+1D73x	𝜰	𝜱	𝜲	𝜳	𝜴	𝜵	𝜶	𝜷	𝜸	𝜹	𝜺	𝜻	𝜼	𝜽	𝜾	𝜿
U+1D74x	𝝀	𝝁	𝝂	𝝃	𝝄	𝝅	𝝆	𝝇	𝝈	𝝉	𝝊	𝝋	𝝌	𝝍	𝝎	𝝏
U+1D75x	𝝐	𝝑	𝝒	𝝓	𝝔	𝝕	𝝖	𝝗	𝝘	𝝙	𝝚	𝝛	𝝜	𝝝	𝝞	𝝟
U+1D76x	𝝠	𝝡	𝝢	𝝣	𝝤	𝝥	𝝦	𝝧	𝝨	𝝩	𝝪	𝝫	𝝬	𝝭	𝝮	𝝯
U+1D77x	𝝰	𝝱	𝝲	𝝳	𝝴	𝝵	𝝶	𝝷	𝝸	𝝹	𝝺	𝝻	𝝼	𝝽	𝝾	𝝿
U+1D78x	𝞀	𝞁	𝞂	𝞃	𝞄	𝞅	𝞆	𝞇	𝞈	𝞉	𝞊	𝞋	𝞌	𝞍	𝞎	𝞏
U+1D79x	𝞐	𝞑	𝞒	𝞓	𝞔	𝞕	𝞖	𝞗	𝞘	𝞙	𝞚	𝞛	𝞜	𝞝	𝞞	𝞟
U+1D7Ax	𝞠	𝞡	𝞢	𝞣	𝞤	𝞥	𝞦	𝞧	𝞨	𝞩	𝞪	𝞫	𝞬	𝞭	𝞮	𝞯
U+1D7Bx	𝞰	𝞱	𝞲	𝞳	𝞴	𝞵	𝞶	𝞷	𝞸	𝞹	𝞺	𝞻	𝞼	𝞽	𝞾	𝞿
U+1D7Cx	𝟀	𝟁	𝟂	𝟃	𝟄	𝟅	𝟆	𝟇	𝟈	𝟉	𝟊	𝟋			𝟎	𝟏
U+1D7Dx	𝟐	𝟑	𝟒	𝟓	𝟔	𝟕	𝟖	𝟗	𝟘	𝟙	𝟚	𝟛	𝟜	𝟝	𝟞	𝟟
U+1D7Ex	𝟠	𝟡	𝟢	𝟣	𝟤	𝟥	𝟦	𝟧	𝟨	𝟩	𝟪	𝟫	𝟬	𝟭	𝟮	𝟯
U+1D7Fx	𝟰	𝟱	𝟲	𝟳	𝟴	𝟵	𝟶	𝟷	𝟸	𝟹	𝟺	𝟻	𝟼	𝟽	𝟾	𝟿
Notes 1.As of Unicode version 18.0 2.Grey areas indicate non-assigned code points

== History ==
The following Unicode-related documents record the purpose and process of defining specific characters in the Mathematical Alphanumeric Symbols block:

Version	Final code points (Note: Proposed code points and characters names may differ from final code points and names)	Count	L2 ID	WG2 ID	Document
3.1	U+1D400..1D454, 1D456..1D49C, 1D49E..1D49F, 1D4A2, 1D4A5..1D4A6, 1D4A9..1D4AC, 1D4AE..1D4B9, 1D4BB, 1D4BD..1D4C0, 1D4C2..1D4C3, 1D4C5..1D505, 1D507..1D50A, 1D50D..1D514, 1D516..1D51C, 1D51E..1D539, 1D53B..1D53E, 1D540..1D544, 1D546, 1D54A..1D550, 1D552..1D6A3, 1D6A8..1D7C9, 1D7CE..1D7FF	991	L2/98-405		Beeton, Barbara; Ion, Patrick (1998-12-01), Proposal to encode additional mathematical and technical symbols in ISO/IEC 10646
3.1	U+1D400..1D454, 1D456..1D49C, 1D49E..1D49F, 1D4A2, 1D4A5..1D4A6, 1D4A9..1D4AC, 1D4AE..1D4B9, 1D4BB, 1D4BD..1D4C0, 1D4C2..1D4C3, 1D4C5..1D505, 1D507..1D50A, 1D50D..1D514, 1D516..1D51C, 1D51E..1D539, 1D53B..1D53E, 1D540..1D544, 1D546, 1D54A..1D550, 1D552..1D6A3, 1D6A8..1D7C9, 1D7CE..1D7FF	991	L2/98-406		Sargent, Murray (1998-12-01), Proposal to encode mathematical variant tags
3.1	U+1D400..1D454, 1D456..1D49C, 1D49E..1D49F, 1D4A2, 1D4A5..1D4A6, 1D4A9..1D4AC, 1D4AE..1D4B9, 1D4BB, 1D4BD..1D4C0, 1D4C2..1D4C3, 1D4C5..1D505, 1D507..1D50A, 1D50D..1D514, 1D516..1D51C, 1D51E..1D539, 1D53B..1D53E, 1D540..1D544, 1D546, 1D54A..1D550, 1D552..1D6A3, 1D6A8..1D7C9, 1D7CE..1D7FF	991	L2/99-049		Beeton, Barbara (1999-01-22), Addendum to L2/98-405: Request for assignment of codes to mathematical and technical symbols
3.1	U+1D400..1D454, 1D456..1D49C, 1D49E..1D49F, 1D4A2, 1D4A5..1D4A6, 1D4A9..1D4AC, 1D4AE..1D4B9, 1D4BB, 1D4BD..1D4C0, 1D4C2..1D4C3, 1D4C5..1D505, 1D507..1D50A, 1D50D..1D514, 1D516..1D51C, 1D51E..1D539, 1D53B..1D53E, 1D540..1D544, 1D546, 1D54A..1D550, 1D552..1D6A3, 1D6A8..1D7C9, 1D7CE..1D7FF	991	L2/99-045		Sargent, Murray; Beeton, Barbara (1999-02-04), Proposal to encode mathematical alphanumeric symbols
3.1	U+1D400..1D454, 1D456..1D49C, 1D49E..1D49F, 1D4A2, 1D4A5..1D4A6, 1D4A9..1D4AC, 1D4AE..1D4B9, 1D4BB, 1D4BD..1D4C0, 1D4C2..1D4C3, 1D4C5..1D505, 1D507..1D50A, 1D50D..1D514, 1D516..1D51C, 1D51E..1D539, 1D53B..1D53E, 1D540..1D544, 1D546, 1D54A..1D550, 1D552..1D6A3, 1D6A8..1D7C9, 1D7CE..1D7FF	991	L2/98-419 (pdf, doc)		Aliprand, Joan (1999-02-05), "Mathematical Symbols", Approved Minutes -- UTC #78 & NCITS Subgroup L2 # 175 Joint Meeting, San Jose, CA -- December 1-4, 1998
3.1	U+1D400..1D454, 1D456..1D49C, 1D49E..1D49F, 1D4A2, 1D4A5..1D4A6, 1D4A9..1D4AC, 1D4AE..1D4B9, 1D4BB, 1D4BD..1D4C0, 1D4C2..1D4C3, 1D4C5..1D505, 1D507..1D50A, 1D50D..1D514, 1D516..1D51C, 1D51E..1D539, 1D53B..1D53E, 1D540..1D544, 1D546, 1D54A..1D550, 1D552..1D6A3, 1D6A8..1D7C9, 1D7CE..1D7FF	991	L2/99-188		Beeton, Barbara; Sargent, Murray (1999-06-09), Proposal to encode mathematical alphanumeric symbols
3.1	U+1D400..1D454, 1D456..1D49C, 1D49E..1D49F, 1D4A2, 1D4A5..1D4A6, 1D4A9..1D4AC, 1D4AE..1D4B9, 1D4BB, 1D4BD..1D4C0, 1D4C2..1D4C3, 1D4C5..1D505, 1D507..1D50A, 1D50D..1D514, 1D516..1D51C, 1D51E..1D539, 1D53B..1D53E, 1D540..1D544, 1D546, 1D54A..1D550, 1D552..1D6A3, 1D6A8..1D7C9, 1D7CE..1D7FF	991	L2/99-176R		Moore, Lisa (1999-11-04), "Math", Minutes from the joint UTC/L2 meeting in Seattle, June 8-10, 1999
3.1	U+1D400..1D454, 1D456..1D49C, 1D49E..1D49F, 1D4A2, 1D4A5..1D4A6, 1D4A9..1D4AC, 1D4AE..1D4B9, 1D4BB, 1D4BD..1D4C0, 1D4C2..1D4C3, 1D4C5..1D505, 1D507..1D50A, 1D50D..1D514, 1D516..1D51C, 1D51E..1D539, 1D53B..1D53E, 1D540..1D544, 1D546, 1D54A..1D550, 1D552..1D6A3, 1D6A8..1D7C9, 1D7CE..1D7FF	991	L2/99-199		Freytag, Asmus (1999-06-14), Math Alphabets
3.1	U+1D400..1D454, 1D456..1D49C, 1D49E..1D49F, 1D4A2, 1D4A5..1D4A6, 1D4A9..1D4AC, 1D4AE..1D4B9, 1D4BB, 1D4BD..1D4C0, 1D4C2..1D4C3, 1D4C5..1D505, 1D507..1D50A, 1D50D..1D514, 1D516..1D51C, 1D51E..1D539, 1D53B..1D53E, 1D540..1D544, 1D546, 1D54A..1D550, 1D552..1D6A3, 1D6A8..1D7C9, 1D7CE..1D7FF	991	L2/99-054R		Aliprand, Joan (1999-06-21), "Math Variants", Approved Minutes from the UTC/L2 meeting in Palo Alto, February 3-5, 1999
3.1	U+1D400..1D454, 1D456..1D49C, 1D49E..1D49F, 1D4A2, 1D4A5..1D4A6, 1D4A9..1D4AC, 1D4AE..1D4B9, 1D4BB, 1D4BD..1D4C0, 1D4C2..1D4C3, 1D4C5..1D505, 1D507..1D50A, 1D50D..1D514, 1D516..1D51C, 1D51E..1D539, 1D53B..1D53E, 1D540..1D544, 1D546, 1D54A..1D550, 1D552..1D6A3, 1D6A8..1D7C9, 1D7CE..1D7FF	991	L2/99-195	N2086 (html, doc)	Sargent, Murray; Beeton, Barbara (1999-09-02), Proposal to encode mathematical alphanumeric symbols
3.1	U+1D400..1D454, 1D456..1D49C, 1D49E..1D49F, 1D4A2, 1D4A5..1D4A6, 1D4A9..1D4AC, 1D4AE..1D4B9, 1D4BB, 1D4BD..1D4C0, 1D4C2..1D4C3, 1D4C5..1D505, 1D507..1D50A, 1D50D..1D514, 1D516..1D51C, 1D51E..1D539, 1D53B..1D53E, 1D540..1D544, 1D546, 1D54A..1D550, 1D552..1D6A3, 1D6A8..1D7C9, 1D7CE..1D7FF	991	L2/00-010	N2103	Umamaheswaran, V. S. (2000-01-05), "10.2", Minutes of WG 2 meeting 37, Copenhagen, Denmark: 1999-09-13—16
3.1	U+1D400..1D454, 1D456..1D49C, 1D49E..1D49F, 1D4A2, 1D4A5..1D4A6, 1D4A9..1D4AC, 1D4AE..1D4B9, 1D4BB, 1D4BD..1D4C0, 1D4C2..1D4C3, 1D4C5..1D505, 1D507..1D50A, 1D50D..1D514, 1D516..1D51C, 1D51E..1D539, 1D53B..1D53E, 1D540..1D544, 1D546, 1D54A..1D550, 1D552..1D6A3, 1D6A8..1D7C9, 1D7CE..1D7FF	991	L2/00-002		Beeton, Barbara (2000-01-09), Request for assignment of codes to mathematical and technical symbols that do not appear in Unicode 2.0 or ISO/IEC 10646
3.1	U+1D400..1D454, 1D456..1D49C, 1D49E..1D49F, 1D4A2, 1D4A5..1D4A6, 1D4A9..1D4AC, 1D4AE..1D4B9, 1D4BB, 1D4BD..1D4C0, 1D4C2..1D4C3, 1D4C5..1D505, 1D507..1D50A, 1D50D..1D514, 1D516..1D51C, 1D51E..1D539, 1D53B..1D53E, 1D540..1D544, 1D546, 1D54A..1D550, 1D552..1D6A3, 1D6A8..1D7C9, 1D7CE..1D7FF	991	L2/00-005R2		Moore, Lisa (2000-02-14), "Motion 82-M4", Minutes of UTC #82 in San Jose
3.1	U+1D400..1D454, 1D456..1D49C, 1D49E..1D49F, 1D4A2, 1D4A5..1D4A6, 1D4A9..1D4AC, 1D4AE..1D4B9, 1D4BB, 1D4BD..1D4C0, 1D4C2..1D4C3, 1D4C5..1D505, 1D507..1D50A, 1D50D..1D514, 1D516..1D51C, 1D51E..1D539, 1D53B..1D53E, 1D540..1D544, 1D546, 1D54A..1D550, 1D552..1D6A3, 1D6A8..1D7C9, 1D7CE..1D7FF	991	L2/00-074	N2168	Karlsson, Kent (2000-03-02), Comments on "Math Alphanumeric" characters for 10646-2
3.1	U+1D400..1D454, 1D456..1D49C, 1D49E..1D49F, 1D4A2, 1D4A5..1D4A6, 1D4A9..1D4AC, 1D4AE..1D4B9, 1D4BB, 1D4BD..1D4C0, 1D4C2..1D4C3, 1D4C5..1D505, 1D507..1D50A, 1D50D..1D514, 1D516..1D51C, 1D51E..1D539, 1D53B..1D53E, 1D540..1D544, 1D546, 1D54A..1D550, 1D552..1D6A3, 1D6A8..1D7C9, 1D7CE..1D7FF	991	L2/00-094	N2191	Proposal for Encoding Additional Mathematical Symbols in the BMP, 2000-03-14
3.1	U+1D400..1D454, 1D456..1D49C, 1D49E..1D49F, 1D4A2, 1D4A5..1D4A6, 1D4A9..1D4AC, 1D4AE..1D4B9, 1D4BB, 1D4BD..1D4C0, 1D4C2..1D4C3, 1D4C5..1D505, 1D507..1D50A, 1D50D..1D514, 1D516..1D51C, 1D51E..1D539, 1D53B..1D53E, 1D540..1D544, 1D546, 1D54A..1D550, 1D552..1D6A3, 1D6A8..1D7C9, 1D7CE..1D7FF	991	L2/00-119 (Note: Refer to the history section of the Miscellaneous Mathematical Symbols-B block for additional math-related documents)	N2191R	Whistler, Ken; Freytag, Asmus (2000-04-19), Encoding Additional Mathematical Symbols in Unicode
3.1	U+1D400..1D454, 1D456..1D49C, 1D49E..1D49F, 1D4A2, 1D4A5..1D4A6, 1D4A9..1D4AC, 1D4AE..1D4B9, 1D4BB, 1D4BD..1D4C0, 1D4C2..1D4C3, 1D4C5..1D505, 1D507..1D50A, 1D50D..1D514, 1D516..1D51C, 1D51E..1D539, 1D53B..1D53E, 1D540..1D544, 1D546, 1D54A..1D550, 1D552..1D6A3, 1D6A8..1D7C9, 1D7CE..1D7FF	991	L2/00-239		Davis, Mark (2000-07-07), Mathematical Letter Symbols
3.1	U+1D400..1D454, 1D456..1D49C, 1D49E..1D49F, 1D4A2, 1D4A5..1D4A6, 1D4A9..1D4AC, 1D4AE..1D4B9, 1D4BB, 1D4BD..1D4C0, 1D4C2..1D4C3, 1D4C5..1D505, 1D507..1D50A, 1D50D..1D514, 1D516..1D51C, 1D51E..1D539, 1D53B..1D53E, 1D540..1D544, 1D546, 1D54A..1D550, 1D552..1D6A3, 1D6A8..1D7C9, 1D7CE..1D7FF	991	L2/00-240		Whistler, Ken (2000-07-07), Re: Mathematical Letter Symbols
3.1	U+1D400..1D454, 1D456..1D49C, 1D49E..1D49F, 1D4A2, 1D4A5..1D4A6, 1D4A9..1D4AC, 1D4AE..1D4B9, 1D4BB, 1D4BD..1D4C0, 1D4C2..1D4C3, 1D4C5..1D505, 1D507..1D50A, 1D50D..1D514, 1D516..1D51C, 1D51E..1D539, 1D53B..1D53E, 1D540..1D544, 1D546, 1D54A..1D550, 1D552..1D6A3, 1D6A8..1D7C9, 1D7CE..1D7FF	991	L2/00-234	N2203 (rtf, txt)	Umamaheswaran, V. S. (2000-07-21), "8.18", Minutes from the SC2/WG2 meeting in Beijing, 2000-03-21 -- 24
3.1	U+1D400..1D454, 1D456..1D49C, 1D49E..1D49F, 1D4A2, 1D4A5..1D4A6, 1D4A9..1D4AC, 1D4AE..1D4B9, 1D4BB, 1D4BD..1D4C0, 1D4C2..1D4C3, 1D4C5..1D505, 1D507..1D50A, 1D50D..1D514, 1D516..1D51C, 1D51E..1D539, 1D53B..1D53E, 1D540..1D544, 1D546, 1D54A..1D550, 1D552..1D6A3, 1D6A8..1D7C9, 1D7CE..1D7FF	991	L2/00-249		Karlsson, Kent (2000-08-03), Re: UTC Agenda item: Mathematical Letter Symbols
3.1	U+1D400..1D454, 1D456..1D49C, 1D49E..1D49F, 1D4A2, 1D4A5..1D4A6, 1D4A9..1D4AC, 1D4AE..1D4B9, 1D4BB, 1D4BD..1D4C0, 1D4C2..1D4C3, 1D4C5..1D505, 1D507..1D50A, 1D50D..1D514, 1D516..1D51C, 1D51E..1D539, 1D53B..1D53E, 1D540..1D544, 1D546, 1D54A..1D550, 1D552..1D6A3, 1D6A8..1D7C9, 1D7CE..1D7FF	991	L2/00-250		Davis, Mark (2000-08-03), Re: UTC Agenda item: Mathematical Letter Symbols
3.1	U+1D400..1D454, 1D456..1D49C, 1D49E..1D49F, 1D4A2, 1D4A5..1D4A6, 1D4A9..1D4AC, 1D4AE..1D4B9, 1D4BB, 1D4BD..1D4C0, 1D4C2..1D4C3, 1D4C5..1D505, 1D507..1D50A, 1D50D..1D514, 1D516..1D51C, 1D51E..1D539, 1D53B..1D53E, 1D540..1D544, 1D546, 1D54A..1D550, 1D552..1D6A3, 1D6A8..1D7C9, 1D7CE..1D7FF	991	L2/00-251		Whistler, Ken (2000-08-03), Re: UTC Agenda item: Mathematical Letter Symbols
3.1	U+1D400..1D454, 1D456..1D49C, 1D49E..1D49F, 1D4A2, 1D4A5..1D4A6, 1D4A9..1D4AC, 1D4AE..1D4B9, 1D4BB, 1D4BD..1D4C0, 1D4C2..1D4C3, 1D4C5..1D505, 1D507..1D50A, 1D50D..1D514, 1D516..1D51C, 1D51E..1D539, 1D53B..1D53E, 1D540..1D544, 1D546, 1D54A..1D550, 1D552..1D6A3, 1D6A8..1D7C9, 1D7CE..1D7FF	991	L2/00-115R2		Moore, Lisa (2000-08-08), "Motion 83-M11", Minutes Of UTC Meeting #83
3.1	U+1D400..1D454, 1D456..1D49C, 1D49E..1D49F, 1D4A2, 1D4A5..1D4A6, 1D4A9..1D4AC, 1D4AE..1D4B9, 1D4BB, 1D4BD..1D4C0, 1D4C2..1D4C3, 1D4C5..1D505, 1D507..1D50A, 1D50D..1D514, 1D516..1D51C, 1D51E..1D539, 1D53B..1D53E, 1D540..1D544, 1D546, 1D54A..1D550, 1D552..1D6A3, 1D6A8..1D7C9, 1D7CE..1D7FF	991	L2/00-271		Sargent, Murray (2000-08-11), A Few Remarks Concerning the Math Alphanumerics
3.1	U+1D400..1D454, 1D456..1D49C, 1D49E..1D49F, 1D4A2, 1D4A5..1D4A6, 1D4A9..1D4AC, 1D4AE..1D4B9, 1D4BB, 1D4BD..1D4C0, 1D4C2..1D4C3, 1D4C5..1D505, 1D507..1D50A, 1D50D..1D514, 1D516..1D51C, 1D51E..1D539, 1D53B..1D53E, 1D540..1D544, 1D546, 1D54A..1D550, 1D552..1D6A3, 1D6A8..1D7C9, 1D7CE..1D7FF	991	L2/00-280		Whistler, Ken (2000-08-22), Math alphanumerics and MathML: A challenge
3.1	U+1D400..1D454, 1D456..1D49C, 1D49E..1D49F, 1D4A2, 1D4A5..1D4A6, 1D4A9..1D4AC, 1D4AE..1D4B9, 1D4BB, 1D4BD..1D4C0, 1D4C2..1D4C3, 1D4C5..1D505, 1D507..1D50A, 1D50D..1D514, 1D516..1D51C, 1D51E..1D539, 1D53B..1D53E, 1D540..1D544, 1D546, 1D54A..1D550, 1D552..1D6A3, 1D6A8..1D7C9, 1D7CE..1D7FF	991	L2/00-187		Moore, Lisa (2000-08-23), "Math Alphanumeric Characters", UTC minutes -- Boston, August 8-11, 2000
3.1	U+1D400..1D454, 1D456..1D49C, 1D49E..1D49F, 1D4A2, 1D4A5..1D4A6, 1D4A9..1D4AC, 1D4AE..1D4B9, 1D4BB, 1D4BD..1D4C0, 1D4C2..1D4C3, 1D4C5..1D505, 1D507..1D50A, 1D50D..1D514, 1D516..1D51C, 1D51E..1D539, 1D53B..1D53E, 1D540..1D544, 1D546, 1D54A..1D550, 1D552..1D6A3, 1D6A8..1D7C9, 1D7CE..1D7FF	991	L2/00-336	N2272	Freytag, Asmus (2000-09-15), On the requirements for alphanumeric fonts for mathematical use
3.1	U+1D400..1D454, 1D456..1D49C, 1D49E..1D49F, 1D4A2, 1D4A5..1D4A6, 1D4A9..1D4AC, 1D4AE..1D4B9, 1D4BB, 1D4BD..1D4C0, 1D4C2..1D4C3, 1D4C5..1D505, 1D507..1D50A, 1D50D..1D514, 1D516..1D51C, 1D51E..1D539, 1D53B..1D53E, 1D540..1D544, 1D546, 1D54A..1D550, 1D552..1D6A3, 1D6A8..1D7C9, 1D7CE..1D7FF	991	L2/01-050	N2253	Umamaheswaran, V. S. (2001-01-21), "8.1 Disposition of ballot comments on FCD 10646-2", Minutes of the SC2/WG2 meeting in Athens, September 2000
3.1	U+1D400..1D454, 1D456..1D49C, 1D49E..1D49F, 1D4A2, 1D4A5..1D4A6, 1D4A9..1D4AC, 1D4AE..1D4B9, 1D4BB, 1D4BD..1D4C0, 1D4C2..1D4C3, 1D4C5..1D505, 1D507..1D50A, 1D50D..1D514, 1D516..1D51C, 1D51E..1D539, 1D53B..1D53E, 1D540..1D544, 1D546, 1D54A..1D550, 1D552..1D6A3, 1D6A8..1D7C9, 1D7CE..1D7FF	991	L2/02-366		Pantelia, Maria (2002-11-07), Proposal to encode two Letterlike Symbols in the UCS
3.1	U+1D400..1D454, 1D456..1D49C, 1D49E..1D49F, 1D4A2, 1D4A5..1D4A6, 1D4A9..1D4AC, 1D4AE..1D4B9, 1D4BB, 1D4BD..1D4C0, 1D4C2..1D4C3, 1D4C5..1D505, 1D507..1D50A, 1D50D..1D514, 1D516..1D51C, 1D51E..1D539, 1D53B..1D53E, 1D540..1D544, 1D546, 1D54A..1D550, 1D552..1D6A3, 1D6A8..1D7C9, 1D7CE..1D7FF	991	L2/02-345		Moore, Lisa (2002-11-18), "Consensus 93-C18", UTC #93 Minutes
3.1	U+1D400..1D454, 1D456..1D49C, 1D49E..1D49F, 1D4A2, 1D4A5..1D4A6, 1D4A9..1D4AC, 1D4AE..1D4B9, 1D4BB, 1D4BD..1D4C0, 1D4C2..1D4C3, 1D4C5..1D505, 1D507..1D50A, 1D50D..1D514, 1D516..1D51C, 1D51E..1D539, 1D53B..1D53E, 1D540..1D544, 1D546, 1D54A..1D550, 1D552..1D6A3, 1D6A8..1D7C9, 1D7CE..1D7FF	991	L2/20-275R		Sargent, Murray (2021-01-05), Proposed variation sequences for math calligraphic letters
3.1	U+1D400..1D454, 1D456..1D49C, 1D49E..1D49F, 1D4A2, 1D4A5..1D4A6, 1D4A9..1D4AC, 1D4AE..1D4B9, 1D4BB, 1D4BD..1D4C0, 1D4C2..1D4C3, 1D4C5..1D505, 1D507..1D50A, 1D50D..1D514, 1D516..1D51C, 1D51E..1D539, 1D53B..1D53E, 1D540..1D544, 1D546, 1D54A..1D550, 1D552..1D6A3, 1D6A8..1D7C9, 1D7CE..1D7FF	991	L2/20-281		Hudson, John (2020-11-10), Recent evolution of math alphabetic calligraphic script style
3.1	U+1D400..1D454, 1D456..1D49C, 1D49E..1D49F, 1D4A2, 1D4A5..1D4A6, 1D4A9..1D4AC, 1D4AE..1D4B9, 1D4BB, 1D4BD..1D4C0, 1D4C2..1D4C3, 1D4C5..1D505, 1D507..1D50A, 1D50D..1D514, 1D516..1D51C, 1D51E..1D539, 1D53B..1D53E, 1D540..1D544, 1D546, 1D54A..1D550, 1D552..1D6A3, 1D6A8..1D7C9, 1D7CE..1D7FF	991	L2/21-016R		Anderson, Deborah; Whistler, Ken; Pournader, Roozbeh; Moore, Lisa; Liang, Hai (2021-01-14), "25 Math Calligraphic Alphabets", Recommendations to UTC #166 January 2021 on Script Proposals
3.1	U+1D400..1D454, 1D456..1D49C, 1D49E..1D49F, 1D4A2, 1D4A5..1D4A6, 1D4A9..1D4AC, 1D4AE..1D4B9, 1D4BB, 1D4BD..1D4C0, 1D4C2..1D4C3, 1D4C5..1D505, 1D507..1D50A, 1D50D..1D514, 1D516..1D51C, 1D51E..1D539, 1D53B..1D53E, 1D540..1D544, 1D546, 1D54A..1D550, 1D552..1D6A3, 1D6A8..1D7C9, 1D7CE..1D7FF	991	L2/21-009		Moore, Lisa (2021-01-27), "Consensus 166-C33", UTC #166 Minutes, "The UTC accepts 52 variation sequences to distinguish roundhand and chancery style mathematical script alphabetic characters"
3.1	U+1D400..1D454, 1D456..1D49C, 1D49E..1D49F, 1D4A2, 1D4A5..1D4A6, 1D4A9..1D4AC, 1D4AE..1D4B9, 1D4BB, 1D4BD..1D4C0, 1D4C2..1D4C3, 1D4C5..1D505, 1D507..1D50A, 1D50D..1D514, 1D516..1D51C, 1D51E..1D539, 1D53B..1D53E, 1D540..1D544, 1D546, 1D54A..1D550, 1D552..1D6A3, 1D6A8..1D7C9, 1D7CE..1D7FF	991	L2/24-244		Mayer, Uwe; et al. (2024-09-17), "2.7 Leibniz", Proposal to encode 11 cossic characters
3.1	U+1D400..1D454, 1D456..1D49C, 1D49E..1D49F, 1D4A2, 1D4A5..1D4A6, 1D4A9..1D4AC, 1D4AE..1D4B9, 1D4BB, 1D4BD..1D4C0, 1D4C2..1D4C3, 1D4C5..1D505, 1D507..1D50A, 1D50D..1D514, 1D516..1D51C, 1D51E..1D539, 1D53B..1D53E, 1D540..1D544, 1D546, 1D54A..1D550, 1D552..1D6A3, 1D6A8..1D7C9, 1D7CE..1D7FF	991	L2/25-232R		Kučera, Jan; Pournader, Roozbeh; Anderson, Deborah; Leroy, Robin; Goregaokar, Manish (2025-10-27), "2.7 Leibniz", Recommendations to UTC #185 (October 2025) on Script Proposals
3.1	U+1D400..1D454, 1D456..1D49C, 1D49E..1D49F, 1D4A2, 1D4A5..1D4A6, 1D4A9..1D4AC, 1D4AE..1D4B9, 1D4BB, 1D4BD..1D4C0, 1D4C2..1D4C3, 1D4C5..1D505, 1D507..1D50A, 1D50D..1D514, 1D516..1D51C, 1D51E..1D539, 1D53B..1D53E, 1D540..1D544, 1D546, 1D54A..1D550, 1D552..1D6A3, 1D6A8..1D7C9, 1D7CE..1D7FF	991		N5333R2	Mayer, Uwe; et al. (2025-11-25), Proposal to encode 12 cossic characters [Affects U+1D4CF]
3.1	U+1D400..1D454, 1D456..1D49C, 1D49E..1D49F, 1D4A2, 1D4A5..1D4A6, 1D4A9..1D4AC, 1D4AE..1D4B9, 1D4BB, 1D4BD..1D4C0, 1D4C2..1D4C3, 1D4C5..1D505, 1D507..1D50A, 1D50D..1D514, 1D516..1D51C, 1D51E..1D539, 1D53B..1D53E, 1D540..1D544, 1D546, 1D54A..1D550, 1D552..1D6A3, 1D6A8..1D7C9, 1D7CE..1D7FF	991	L2/26-054R2		Anderson, Debbie; Constable, Peter (2026-01-22), "2. Cossic characters [Affects U+1D4CF]", Proposed Leibniz additions for Unicode 18.0
3.1	U+1D400..1D454, 1D456..1D49C, 1D49E..1D49F, 1D4A2, 1D4A5..1D4A6, 1D4A9..1D4AC, 1D4AE..1D4B9, 1D4BB, 1D4BD..1D4C0, 1D4C2..1D4C3, 1D4C5..1D505, 1D507..1D50A, 1D50D..1D514, 1D516..1D51C, 1D51E..1D539, 1D53B..1D53E, 1D540..1D544, 1D546, 1D54A..1D550, 1D552..1D6A3, 1D6A8..1D7C9, 1D7CE..1D7FF	991	L2/26-003		"Consensus 186-C32", UTC #186 Minutes, 2026-02-01, "UTC accepts the variation sequence 1D4CF FE02 "kurrent style" for base character 1D4CF MATHEMATICAL SCRIPT SMALL Z"
4.0	U+1D4C1	1		N2449	Defect Report on MATHEMATICAL SCRIPT SMALL L, 2002-05-15
4.0	U+1D4C1	1	L2/02-372	N2453 (pdf, doc)	Umamaheswaran, V. S. (2002-10-30), "12.2 Mathematical script - SMALL L", Unconfirmed minutes of WG 2 meeting 42
4.1	U+1D6A4..1D6A5	2	L2/03-194	N2590	Freytag, Asmus (2003-06-09), Additional Mathematical and Letterlike Characters
5.0	U+1D7CA..1D7CB	2	L2/04-406		Freytag, Asmus; Sargent, Murray; Beeton, Barbara; Carlisle, David (2004-11-15), Progress report on Mathematical Symbols
5.0	U+1D7CA..1D7CB	2	L2/04-410		Freytag, Asmus (2004-11-18), Twenty six mathematical characters
18.0	U+1D6A6	1	L2/24-244		Mayer, Uwe; et al. (2024-09-17), Proposal to encode 11 cossic characters
18.0	U+1D6A6	1	L2/24-228		Kučera, Jan; et al. (2024-11-01), "3.5 Cossic characters", Recommendations to UTC #181 (November 2024) on Script Proposals
18.0	U+1D6A6	1	L2/25-123		Mayer, Uwe; et al. (2025-03-24), Proposal to encode 11 cossic characters
18.0	U+1D6A6	1	L2/25-091R		Kučera, Jan; et al. (2025-04-22), "5.12 Leibniz", Recommendations to UTC #183 (April 2025) on Script Proposals
18.0	U+1D6A6	1		N5333	Mayer, Uwe; et al. (2025-05-13), Proposal to encode 12 cossic characters
18.0	U+1D6A6	1		N5333R	Mayer, Uwe; et al. (2025-09-30), Proposal to encode 12 cossic characters
18.0	U+1D6A6	1	L2/25-232R		Kučera, Jan; Pournader, Roozbeh; Anderson, Deborah; Leroy, Robin; Goregaokar, Manish (2025-10-27), "2.7 Leibniz", Recommendations to UTC #185 (October 2025) on Script Proposals
18.0	U+1D6A6	1		N5333R2	Mayer, Uwe; et al. (2025-11-25), Proposal to encode 12 cossic characters
18.0	U+1D6A6	1	L2/26-054R2		Anderson, Debbie; Constable, Peter (2026-01-22), "2. Cossic characters", Proposed Leibniz additions for Unicode 18.0
18.0	U+1D6A6	1	L2/26-003		"Consensus 186-C31", UTC #186 Minutes, 2026-02-01, "UTC accepts [...] Cossic characters for encoding in Unicode 18.0 ..."

== See also ==
- Greek letters used in mathematics, science, and engineering
- List of mathematical uses of Latin letters
- Mathematical operators and symbols in Unicode
- List of typographic features § Features intended for digits and math
- Mathematical notation
- Symbols for Legacy Computing Supplement for outlined Latin glyphs and numerals
