= Circle symbol =

Circle symbol may refer to:

== Art and Music ==
- ^{o}, music symbol denoting a:
  - Diminished triad
  - Diminished seventh chord
- , an Ensō, a hand drawn circle in Zen art

== Language ==
- ˚, ring diacritic
- º, masculine ordinal indicator
- ^{o}, a common superior letter
- Upper and lowercase vowel letters in the:
  - O or o, Latin alphabet
  - Ο or ο, Greek alphabet
  - О or о, Cyrillic alphabet
- 𐤏, Semitic/Phoenician letter ayin, the ancestor of the Greek, Latin, Cyrillic etc. letters
- ㅇ, Korean hangul letter ieung
- , Sitelen Pona glyph for ijo

== Mathematics ==
- ∘, the ring operator denoting function composition
- 0, the number zero

== Other ==
- ◦, typographical bullet symbol introducing items in a list
- °, degree symbol
- ○, gender symbol used to identify female, asexual or non-binary people
- ◌, dotted circle
- ◯, the circle mark

== See also ==
- Circle (disambiguation)
- Degree symbol § Lookalikes
- List of circle topics
- O (disambiguation)
- Ø (disambiguation)
- ⊕ (disambiguation)
- ⊖ (disambiguation)
- O § Related characters
- Unicode:
  - Geometric Shapes (Unicode block)
  - List of Unicode circle symbols
  - Miscellaneous Mathematical Symbols-B (Unicode block)
