= Numero sign =

Typographic abbreviation of the word "number(s)"

№o

Numero sign
- In Unicode: U+2116 № NUMERO SIGN (&numero;)

Related
- See also: U+0023 # NUMBER SIGN; U+00BA º MASCULINE ORDINAL INDICATOR

The numero sign or numero symbol, № (also represented as Nº, No̱, No., or no.), is a typographic abbreviation of the word number(s) indicating ordinal numeration, especially in names and titles. For example, using the numero sign, the written long-form of the address "Number 17 Cherry Tree Lane" is shortened to "№ 17 Cherry Tree Ln.", yet both forms are spoken long.

Typographically, the numero sign combines as a single ligature the uppercase Latin letter ⟨N⟩ with a (usually superscript) lowercase letter ⟨o⟩, sometimes underlined, resembling the masculine ordinal indicator º. The ligature has a code point in Unicode as a precomposed character, U+2116 № NUMERO SIGN.

The Oxford English Dictionary derives the numero sign from Latin numero, the ablative form of numerus ("number", with the ablative denotations of "by the number, with the number"). In Romance languages, the numero sign is understood as an abbreviation of the word for "number", e.g. Italian numero, French numéro, and Portuguese and Spanish número.

This article describes other typographical abbreviations for "number" in different languages, in addition to the numero sign proper.

== Usages ==
The numero sign's non-ligature substitution by the two separate letters ⟨N⟩ and ⟨o⟩ is common. A capital or lower-case "n" may be used, followed by "o.", superscript "o", ordinal indicator, or the degree sign; this will be understood in most languages.

=== Bulgarian ===
Bulgarian keyboard layout (BDS 5237:1978)

In Bulgarian the numero sign is often used and it is present in three widely used keyboard layouts accessible with Shift-0 in BDS and prBDS and with Shift-3 on the Phonetic layout.

=== English ===
In many forms of English, the non-ligature form No. is typical and is often used to abbreviate the word "number". In North America, the number sign, #, is more prevalent. The ligature form does not appear on British or American QWERTY keyboards.

The № symbol is sometimes referred to by the term "number sign" in English.

=== French ===
The numero symbol is not in common use in France and does not appear on a standard AZERTY keyboard. Instead, the French Imprimerie nationale recommends the use of the form "n^{o}" (an "n" followed by a superscript lowercase "o"). The plural form "n^{os}" can also be used. In practice, the "o" is often replaced by the degree symbol (°), which is visually similar to the superscript "o" and is easily accessible on an AZERTY keyboard.

=== Indonesian and Malaysian ===
"Nomor" in Indonesian and "nombor" in Malaysian; therefore "No." is commonly used as an abbreviation with standard spelling and full stop.

=== Italian ===
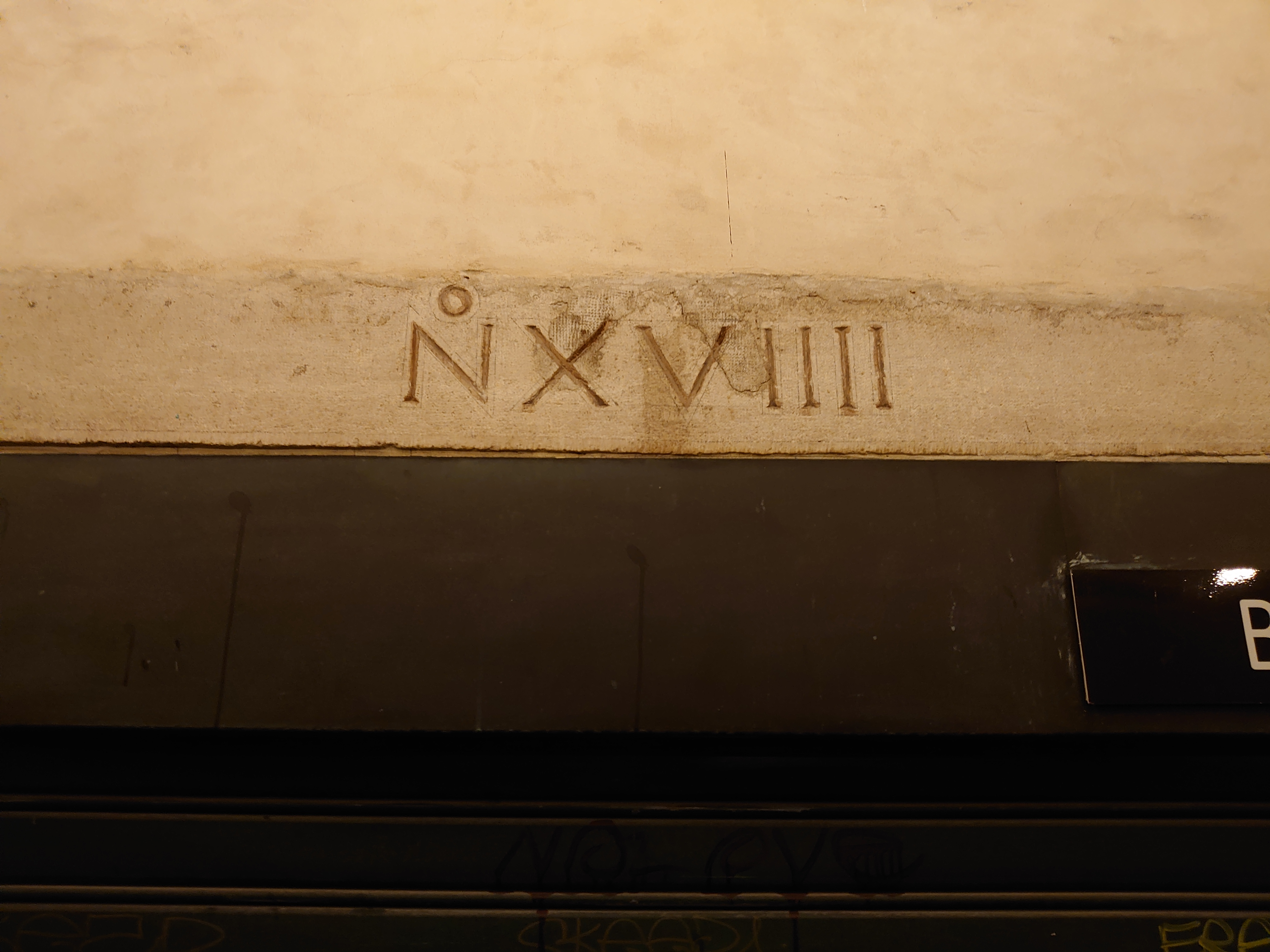
Sign showing the rarer Nͦ form in Italy

The sign is usually replaced with the abbreviations "n." or "nº", the latter using a masculine ordinal indicator, rather than a superscript "O".

=== Philippine languages ===
Because of more than three centuries of Spanish colonisation, the word número is found in almost all Philippine languages. "No." is its common notation in local languages as well as English.

=== Portuguese ===
In Portugal, the similar-looking notation n.º is often used. In Brazil, where Portuguese is the official language, nº is often used on official documents. In both cases, the symbol used (º) is the masculine ordinal indicator. However, the Brazilian National Standards Organization (ABNT) determines that the word "número" should be abbreviated "n." only.

=== Russian ===
Russian keyboard layout for Windows. The № sign can be seen on the 3 key.

Although the letter ⟨N⟩ is not in the Cyrillic alphabet, the numero sign № is typeset in Russian publishing, and is available on Russian computer and typewriter keyboards.

The numero sign is very widely used in Russia and other post-Soviet states in many official and casual contexts. Examples include usage for law and other official documents numbering, names of institutions (hospitals, kindergartens, schools, libraries, organization departments and so on), numbering of periodical publications (such as newspapers and magazines), numbering of public transport routes, etc.

"№ п/п" (номер по порядку, "sequential number") is universally used as a table header to denote a column containing the table row number.

The № sign is sometimes used in Russian medical prescriptions (which according to the law must be written in Latin language) as an abbreviation for the Latin word numero to indicate the number of prescribed dosages (for example, tablets or capsules), and on the price tags in drugstores and pharmacy websites to indicate number of unit doses in drug packages, although the standard abbreviation for use in prescriptions is the Latin ⟨N⟩.

=== Spanish ===
The numero sign is not typically used in Iberian Spanish, and it is not present on standard keyboard layouts. According to the Real Academia Española and the Fundéu BBVA, the word número (number) is abbreviated per the Spanish typographic convention of letras voladas ("flying letters"). The first letter(s) of the word to be abbreviated are followed by a period; then, the final letter(s) of the word are written as lowercase superscripts. This gives the abbreviations n.^{o} (singular) and n.^{os} (plural). The abbreviation "no." is not used (it might be mistaken for the Spanish negative word no). The abbreviations nro. and núm. are also acceptable. The numero sign, either as a one-character symbol № or composed of the letter N plus superscript "o" (sometimes underlined or substituted by the ordinal indicator, º), is common in Latin America, where the interpolated period is sometimes not used in abbreviations.

=== Nr. ===
In some languages, Nr., nr., nr or NR is used instead, reflecting the abbreviation of the language's word for "number". In German, which capitalises all nouns and abbreviations of nouns, the word Nummer is abbreviated as Nr. Lithuanian uses this spelling as well, and it is usually capitalised in bureaucratic contexts, especially with the meaning "reference number" (such as sutarties Nr., "contract No.") but in other contexts it follows the usual sentence capitalisation (such as tel. nr., abbreviation for telefono numeris, "telephone number"). It is commonly lowercase in other languages, such as Dutch, Danish, Norwegian, Polish, Romanian, Estonian and Swedish. Some languages, such as Polish, omit the dot in abbreviations if the abbreviation ends with the last letter of the original word.

== Typing the symbol ==
The sign is encoded in Unicode as U+2116 № NUMERO SIGN and many platforms and languages have methods to enter it. See Unicode input and the relevant keyboard articles for further details.

== See also ==
- Superior letter
