= DG International =

Character encoding

This is the Data General international character set:

DG International
| | 0 | 1 | 2 | 3 | 4 | 5 | 6 | 7 | 8 | 9 | A | B | C | D | E | F |
| Ax | | ¬ | ½ | µ | ² | ³ | ¤ | ¢ | £ | ª | º | ¡ | ¿ | © | ® | ‡ |
| Bx | » | « | ¶ | ™ | ƒ | ¥ | ± | ≤ | ≥ | · | ˋ | § | ° | ¨ | ´ | ↑ |
| Cx | Á | À | Â | Ä | Ã | Å | Æ | Ç | É | È | Ê | Ë | Í | Ì | Î | Ï |
| Dx | Ñ | Ó | Ò | Ô | Ö | Õ | Ø | Œ | Ú | Ù | Û | Ü | | Ÿ | | |
| Ex | á | à | â | ä | ã | å | æ | ç | é | è | ê | ë | í | ì | î | ï |
| Fx | ñ | ó | ò | ô | ö | õ | ø | œ | ú | ù | û | ü | ß | ÿ | | ░ |

The Dasher D210/211 display terminals used the following character sets:

American character set
| | 0 | 1 | 2 | 3 | 4 | 5 | 6 | 7 | 8 | 9 | A | B | C | D | E | F |
|---|---|---|---|---|---|---|---|---|---|---|---|---|---|---|---|---|
| 2 | | | | | | | | | | ! | " | # | $ | % | & | ´ |
| 3 | | | ( | ) | * | + | , | - | . | / | | | 0 | 1 | 2 | 3 |
| 4 | 4 | 5 | 6 | 7 | | | 8 | 9 | : | ; | < | = | > | ? | | |
| 6 | | | | | @ | A | B | C | D | E | F | G | | | H | I |
| 7 | J | K | L | M | N | O | | | P | Q | R | S | T | U | V | W |
| 8 | | | X | Y | Z | [ | \ | ] | ^ | _ | | | ` | a | b | c |
| 9 | d | e | f | g | | | h | i | j | k | l | m | n | o | | |
| A | p | q | r | s | t | u | v | w | | | x | y | z | { | | | } |
| B | ~ | ░ | | | | | | | | | | | | | | |

United Kingdom character set
| | 0 | 1 | 2 | 3 | 4 | 5 | 6 | 7 | 8 | 9 | A | B | C | D | E | F |
|---|---|---|---|---|---|---|---|---|---|---|---|---|---|---|---|---|
| 2 | | | | | | | | | | | | £ | | | | |
| 8 | | | | | | | | | ↑ | | | | | | | |

French character set
| | 0 | 1 | 2 | 3 | 4 | 5 | 6 | 7 | 8 | 9 | A | B | C | D | E | F |
|---|---|---|---|---|---|---|---|---|---|---|---|---|---|---|---|---|
| 2 | | | | | | | | | | | | £ | | | | |
| 6 | | | | | à | | | | | | | | | | | |
| 8 | | | | | | º | ç | § | | | | | | | | |
| A | | | | | | | | | | | | | | é | ù | è |

German character set
| | 0 | 1 | 2 | 3 | 4 | 5 | 6 | 7 | 8 | 9 | A | B | C | D | E | F |
|---|---|---|---|---|---|---|---|---|---|---|---|---|---|---|---|---|
| 6 | | | | | § | | | | | | | | | | | |
| 8 | | | | | | Ä | Ö | Ü | | | | | | | | |
| A | | | | | | | | | | | | | | ä | ö | ü |
| B | ß | | | | | | | | | | | | | | | |

Spanish character set
| | 0 | 1 | 2 | 3 | 4 | 5 | 6 | 7 | 8 | 9 | A | B | C | D | E | F |
|---|---|---|---|---|---|---|---|---|---|---|---|---|---|---|---|---|
| 8 | | | | | | Ñ | | | | | | | | | | |
| A | | | | | | | | | | | | | | | ñ | |

Swedish/Finnish character set
| | 0 | 1 | 2 | 3 | 4 | 5 | 6 | 7 | 8 | 9 | A | B | C | D | E | F |
|---|---|---|---|---|---|---|---|---|---|---|---|---|---|---|---|---|
| 2 | | | | | | | | | | | | | ¤ | | | |
| 6 | | | | | É | | | | | | | | | | | |
| 8 | | | | | | Ä | Ö | Â | Ü | | | | é | ä | ö | â |
| 9 | ü | | | | | | | | | | | | | | | |

Danish/Norwegian character set
| | 0 | 1 | 2 | 3 | 4 | 5 | 6 | 7 | 8 | 9 | A | B | C | D | E | F |
|---|---|---|---|---|---|---|---|---|---|---|---|---|---|---|---|---|
| 2 | | | | | | | | | | | | | ¤ | | | |
| 6 | | | | | Ä | | | | | | | | | | | |
| 8 | | | | | | Æ | Ø | Â | Ü | | | | ä | | | |
| A | | | | | | | | | | | | | | æ | ø | â |
| B | ü | | | | | | | | | | | | | | | |

Swiss character set
| | 0 | 1 | 2 | 3 | 4 | 5 | 6 | 7 | 8 | 9 | A | B | C | D | E | F |
|---|---|---|---|---|---|---|---|---|---|---|---|---|---|---|---|---|
| 2 | | | | | | | | | | | | ù | | | | |
| 6 | | | | | à | | | | | | | | | | | |
| 8 | | | | | | ë | ç | è | ê | | | | ô | | | |
| A | | | | | | | | | | | | | | ä | ö | ü |
| B | é | | | | | | | | | | | | | | | |

International character set
| | 0 | 1 | 2 | 3 | 4 | 5 | 6 | 7 | 8 | 9 | A | B | C | D | E | F |
|---|---|---|---|---|---|---|---|---|---|---|---|---|---|---|---|---|
| 2 | | | | | | | | | | | | | | | ¤ | ¢ |
| 3 | | | £ | | | ¡ | ¿ | | | | | | | | | |
| 6 | | | | | Á | À | Â | Ä | Ã | Å | Æ | Ç | | | É | È |
| 7 | Ê | Ë | Í | Ì | Î | Ï | | | Ñ | Ó | Ò | Ô | Ö | Õ | Ø | Œ |
| 8 | | | Ú | Ù | Û | Ü | | | | | | | á | à | â | ä |
| 9 | ã | å | æ | ç | | | é | è | ê | ë | í | ì | î | ï | | |
| A | ñ | ó | ò | ô | ö | õ | ø | œ | | | ú | ù | û | ü | ß | |
| B | ░ | | | | | | | | | | | | | | | |
