= 0 (disambiguation) =

0 is a number and a numerical digit.

0 may also refer to:

== Arts and entertainment ==
- 0 (album), 2014, by Low Roar
- 0, a 2013 album by Ichiko Aoba
- 0, a character from the Kirby video game series
- 0, a character in Star Trek: The Q Continuum
- 0 or #0, stage name of American musician Sid Wilson, when performing with the band Slipknot

== Other uses ==
- 0 (year), used in some calendar systems
- Lightyear 0, an all-solar-electric executive liftback
- Slashed zero (0̷), a glyph used to distinguish the numeral 0 from the letter O
- 42nd Street Shuttle (internal code: 0),a New York City Subway shuttle train service, US

== See also ==
- /dev/zero, a special file in Unix-like operating systems that outputs null characters
- Symbols for zero
- #0 por Movistar Plus+, a former Spanish TV channel
- O, a letter of the Latin alphabet
- Ø, a letter of several Scandinavian alphabets
- Circle symbol (disambiguation)
- Empty set (∅), the set having no elements
- Zero sharp (0#), in the Gödel constructible universe
- Phi (Φ), a letter of the Greek alphabet
- Theta (Θ), a letter of the Greek alphabet
- ⌀, the diameter symbol
- 00 (disambiguation)
- 0° (disambiguation)
- Ø (disambiguation)
- Null (disambiguation)
- Zero (disambiguation)
- Year Zero (disambiguation)
