= 0W =

0W (zero W) or 0-W may refer to:

- 0W, zero west, or 0°W, coordinate of the prime meridian
- 0W or ZW, or zero width, a non-printing character used in computer typesetting of some complex scripts
  - Zero-width joiner
  - Zero-width non-joiner
  - Zero-width space
  - Zero-width non-breaking space
- Zero waste, an environmental concept

== See also ==
- OW (disambiguation)
- W0 (disambiguation)
