= NUL =

NUL may refer to:

- National University of Lesotho
- National Urban League, US civil rights organization
- Newcastle-under-Lyme, a town in Staffordshire, England
  - Borough of Newcastle-under-Lyme, a local government district
- Nul (band) or NuL, a South African band
- Nul, rulers of a Galactic Empire in Brian Aldiss's Bow Down to Nul
- Nulato Airport (IATA code), airport in Nulato, Alaska

== Computers ==
- The abbreviation for the null character in many character sets
- The NUL: device in DOS and related systems

== De Nul ==
- Agnes De Nul (born 1955), Belgian actress
- André De Nul (1946–2025), Belgian footballer
- Jan De Nul, a family-owned company, originally from Belgium

== See also ==
- "Nul Book Standard", an EP by the Futureheads
- Nul Darreh, a village in Iran
- Nul is nie niks nie, an Afrikaans film
- Nul Points; see Voting at the Eurovision Song Contest#Scoring no points
- Nul Points (book), about the recipients of "nul points" at the Eurovision Song Contest
- Nul Records, a record label
- Null (disambiguation page)
