= Symbols for zero =

Symbol representing the number or digit 0

The modern numerical digit 0 is usually written as a circle, an ellipse or a rounded square or rectangle.

== Glyphs ==

In most modern typefaces, the height of the 0 character is the same as the other digits. However, in typefaces with text figures, the character is often shorter (x-height).

A comparison of the letter O and the number 0

Traditionally, many print typefaces made the capital letter O more rounded than the narrower, elliptical digit 0. Typewriters originally made no distinction in shape between O and 0; some models did not even have a separate key for the digit 0. The distinction came into prominence on modern character displays.

The digit 0 with a dot in the centre seems to have originated as an option on IBM 3270 displays. Its appearance has continued with Taligent's command line typeface Andalé Mono.

An alternative, the slashed zero (looking similar to the letter O except for the slash), was primarily used in hand-written coding sheets before transcription to punched cards or tape, and is also used in old-style ASCII graphic sets descended from the default typewheel on the Teletype Model 33 ASR. This form is similar to the symbol $\emptyset$ representing the empty set (U+2205 ∅ EMPTY SET), as well as to the letter ⟨Ø⟩ (U+00D8 Ø LATIN CAPITAL LETTER O WITH STROKE) used in several Scandinavian languages. Some Burroughs/Unisys equipment displays a digit 0 with a reversed slash.

The opposing convention that has the letter O with a slash and the digit 0 without was advocated by SHARE, a prominent IBM user group, and recommended by IBM for writing FORTRAN programs, and by a few other early mainframe makers; this is even more problematic for Scandinavians because it means two of their letters collide. Others advocated the opposite convention, including IBM for writing Algol programs. Another convention used on some early line printers left digit 0 unornamented but added a tail or hook to the capital O so that it resembled an inverted letter ⟨Q⟩ ( Q ) or cursive capital letter-O ($\mathcal O$, U+1D4AA 𝒪 MATHEMATICAL SCRIPT CAPITAL O).

Some computer fonts made one of the capital-O more rounded and the digit-0 more angular (closer to a rectangle). The TI-99/4A computer has a more angular capital O and a more rounded digit 0, whereas others made the choice the other way around.

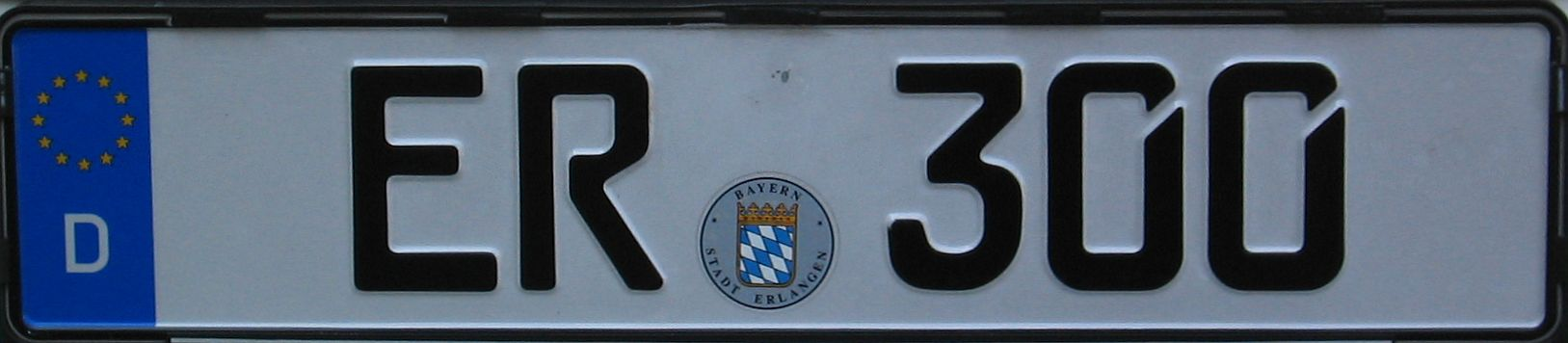
German license plate with slit zeros

The typeface used on most European vehicle registration plates distinguishes the two symbols partially in this manner (having a more rectangular or wider shape for the capital O than the digit 0), but in several countries a further distinction is made by slitting open the digit 0 on the upper right side (as in German plates using the fälschungserschwerende Schrift, "forgery-impeding typeface").

Sometimes the digit 0 is used either exclusively, or not at all, to avoid confusion altogether. For example, confirmation numbers used by Southwest Airlines use only the capital letters O and I instead of the digits 0 and 1, while Canadian postal codes use only the digits 1 and 0 and never the capital letters O and I, although letters and numbers always alternate.

== Other ==
Other representations of zero
Usual appearance of zero on seven-segment displays

Unusual smaller appearance of zero on seven-segment displays

International maritime signal flag for 0

On the seven-segment displays of calculators, watches, and household appliances, 0 is usually shown with six line segments, though on some historical calculator models it was shown with four line segments.

The international maritime signal flag has five plus signs in an X arrangement.

== Zero symbols in Unicode ==
- U+0030 0 DIGIT ZERO
- U+0660 ٠ ARABIC-INDIC DIGIT ZERO
- U+06DF ۟ ARABIC SMALL HIGH ROUNDED ZERO
- U+06E0 ۠ ARABIC SMALL HIGH UPRIGHT RECTANGULAR ZERO
- U+06F0 ۰ EXTENDED ARABIC-INDIC DIGIT ZERO
- U+07C0 ߀ NKO DIGIT ZERO
- U+0966 ० DEVANAGARI DIGIT ZERO
- U+09E6 ০ BENGALI DIGIT ZERO
- U+0A66 ੦ GURMUKHI DIGIT ZERO
- U+0AE6 ૦ GUJARATI DIGIT ZERO
- U+0B66 ୦ ORIYA DIGIT ZERO
- U+0BE6 ௦ TAMIL DIGIT ZERO
- U+0C66 ౦ TELUGU DIGIT ZERO
- U+0C78 ౸ TELUGU FRACTION DIGIT ZERO FOR ODD POWERS OF FOUR
- U+0CE6 ೦ KANNADA DIGIT ZERO
- U+0D66 ൦ MALAYALAM DIGIT ZERO
- U+0DE6 ෦ SINHALA LITH DIGIT ZERO
- U+0E50 ๐ THAI DIGIT ZERO
- U+0ED0 ໐ LAO DIGIT ZERO
- U+0F20 ༠ TIBETAN DIGIT ZERO
- U+0F33 ༳ TIBETAN DIGIT HALF ZERO
- U+1040 ၀ MYANMAR DIGIT ZERO
- U+1090 ႐ MYANMAR SHAN DIGIT ZERO
- U+17E0 ០ KHMER DIGIT ZERO
- U+1810 ᠐ MONGOLIAN DIGIT ZERO
- U+1946 ᥆ LIMBU DIGIT ZERO
- U+19D0 ᧐ NEW TAI LUE DIGIT ZERO
- U+1A80 ᪀ TAI THAM HORA DIGIT ZERO
- U+1A90 ᪐ TAI THAM THAM DIGIT ZERO
- U+1B50 ᭐ BALINESE DIGIT ZERO
- U+1BB0 ᮰ SUNDANESE DIGIT ZERO
- U+1C40 ᱀ LEPCHA DIGIT ZERO
- U+1C50 ᱐ OL CHIKI DIGIT ZERO
- U+2070 ⁰ SUPERSCRIPT ZERO
- U+2080 ₀ SUBSCRIPT ZERO
- U+2189 ↉ VULGAR FRACTION ZERO THIRDS
- U+24EA ⓪ CIRCLED DIGIT ZERO
- U+24FF ⓿ NEGATIVE CIRCLED DIGIT ZERO
- U+3007 〇 IDEOGRAPHIC NUMBER ZERO
- U+3358 ㍘ IDEOGRAPHIC TELEGRAPH SYMBOL FOR HOUR ZERO
- U+A620 ꘠ VAI DIGIT ZERO
- U+A8D0 ꣐ SAURASHTRA DIGIT ZERO
- U+A8E0 ꣠ COMBINING DEVANAGARI DIGIT ZERO
- U+A900 ꤀ KAYAH LI DIGIT ZERO
- U+A9D0 ꧐ JAVANESE DIGIT ZERO
- U+A9F0 ꧰ MYANMAR TAI LAING DIGIT ZERO
- U+AA50 ꩐ CHAM DIGIT ZERO
- U+ABF0 ꯰ MEETEI MAYEK DIGIT ZERO
- U+FF10 ０ FULLWIDTH DIGIT ZERO
- U+1018A 𐆊 GREEK ZERO SIGN
- U+104A0 𐒠 OSMANYA DIGIT ZERO
- U+10D30 𐴰 HANIFI ROHINGYA DIGIT ZERO
- U+11066 𑁦 BRAHMI DIGIT ZERO
- U+110F0 𑃰 SORA SOMPENG DIGIT ZERO
- U+11136 𑄶 CHAKMA DIGIT ZERO
- U+111D0 𑇐 SHARADA DIGIT ZERO
- U+112F0 𑋰 KHUDAWADI DIGIT ZERO
- U+11366 𑍦 COMBINING GRANTHA DIGIT ZERO
- U+11450 𑑐 NEWA DIGIT ZERO
- U+114D0 𑓐 TIRHUTA DIGIT ZERO
- U+11650 𑙐 MODI DIGIT ZERO
- U+116C0 𑛀 TAKRI DIGIT ZERO
- U+11730 𑜰 AHOM DIGIT ZERO
- U+118E0 𑣠 WARANG CITI DIGIT ZERO
- U+11950 𑥐 DIVES AKURU DIGIT ZERO
- U+11C50 𑱐 BHAIKSUKI DIGIT ZERO
- U+11D50 𑵐 MASARAM GONDI DIGIT ZERO
- U+11DA0 𑶠 GUNJALA GONDI DIGIT ZERO
- U+16A60 𖩠 MRO DIGIT ZERO
- U+16B50 𖭐 PAHAWH HMONG DIGIT ZERO
- U+16E80 𖺀 MEDEFAIDRIN DIGIT ZERO
- U+1D2E0 𝋠 MAYAN NUMERAL ZERO
- U+1D7CE 𝟎 MATHEMATICAL BOLD DIGIT ZERO
- U+1D7D8 𝟘 MATHEMATICAL DOUBLE-STRUCK DIGIT ZERO
- U+1D7E2 𝟢 MATHEMATICAL SANS-SERIF DIGIT ZERO
- U+1D7EC 𝟬 MATHEMATICAL SANS-SERIF BOLD DIGIT ZERO
- U+1D7F6 𝟶 MATHEMATICAL MONOSPACE DIGIT ZERO
- U+1E140 𞅀 NYIAKENG PUACHUE HMONG DIGIT ZERO
- U+1E2F0 𞋰 WANCHO DIGIT ZERO
- U+1E950 𞥐 ADLAM DIGIT ZERO
- U+1F100 🄀 DIGIT ZERO FULL STOP
- U+1F101 🄁 DIGIT ZERO COMMA
- U+1F10B 🄋 DINGBAT CIRCLED SANS-SERIF DIGIT ZERO
- U+1F10C 🄌 DINGBAT NEGATIVE CIRCLED SANS-SERIF DIGIT ZERO
- U+1F10D 🄍 CIRCLED ZERO WITH SLASH
- U+1FBF0 🯰 SEGMENTED DIGIT ZERO
- U+E0030 TAG DIGIT ZERO

== See also ==
- Arabic numeral variations § Slashed zero
- Regional handwriting variation § Arabic numerals
- Ø (disambiguation)
- Zero width (disambiguation)
