= Null =

Null may refer to:

== Science, technology, and mathematics ==
=== Astronomy ===
- Nuller, an optical tool using interferometry to block certain sources of light

=== Computing ===
- Null (SQL) (or NULL), a special marker and keyword in SQL indicating that a data value does not exist, is not known, or is missing
- Null character, the zero-valued ASCII character, also designated by NUL, often used as a terminator, separator or filler. This symbol has no visual representation
- Null device, a virtual file that discards data written to it, on Unix systems /dev/null
- Null pointer or reference (sometimes written NULL, nil, or None), an object pointer (or reference) not currently set to point (or refer) to a valid object

=== Linguistics ===
- Null (linguistics) (sometimes zero), a segment that is not pronounced or written:
  - Null morpheme (or zero morpheme), a morpheme that has no phonetic form
  - Null coda, the coda of syllables ending in a vowel; especially in reference to languages that forbid codas
  - Null onset (or empty onset, or zero onset), the onset of syllables beginning in a vowel; forbidden in some languages
  - Null-onset letter (or zero consonant), a consonant letter that does not correspond to a consonant sound, but is required when a word or syllable starts with a vowel
  - Null-subject language, a language whose grammar permits an independent clause to lack an explicit subject; such a clause is said to have a "null subject"
  - Null copula (or zero copula), a phenomenon whereby the subject is joined to the predicate without overt marking of this relationship

=== Mathematics ===
- Null (mathematics), a zero value in several branches of mathematics

=== Physics ===
- Null (physics), a point in a field where the field quantity is zero
- Null (radio), a concept in electromagnetism

== Arts and media ==
- The Null Corporation, an imprint of the band Nine Inch Nails
- Null (Intronaut EP), 2006
- Null (Foetus EP), 1995
- Null, an identity of the character Gray Fox in the Metal Gear Solid: Portable Ops video game
- Null, a villain from Teenage Mutant Ninja Turtles Adventures
- Null (The Legend of Zelda), the main antagonist of The Legend of Zelda: Echoes of Wisdom
- Null, a character from Baldi's Basics

== People with the surname ==
- Ashley Null (born 1960s), American Anglican theologian and bishop
- Christopher Null (born 1971), American writer and film critic
- Cecil Null (1927–2001), American songwriter
- Eduard van der Nüll (1812–1868), Austrian architect
- Gary Null (born 1945), American radio host and author of works about alternative medicine
- Jack Null (1924–2003), American college basketball coach
- Keith Null (born 1985), American football player
- Luke Null (born 1990), American actor and comedian

== See also ==
- ∅ (disambiguation)
- Ø (disambiguation)
- Null symbol (disambiguation)
- 0 (disambiguation)
- Nil (disambiguation)
- Nul (disambiguation)
- Nullity (disambiguation)
- Nullification (disambiguation)
- Nothing (disambiguation)
