= Chancel (disambiguation) =

A chancel is a part of a church building.

Chancel may also refer to:

== People ==
=== Surnamed ===
Chancel is a French surname. Notable people with the surname include:

- Annie Chancel (born 1945), French pop singer
- François Joseph Lagrange-Chancel (1677–1758), French satirist and playwright
- Gustav Chancel (1822–1890), French chemist
- Jacques Chancel (1928–2014), French writer
- Jules Chancel (1867–1944), French writer
- Lucas Chancel (born 1987), French economist

=== Given named ===
- Chancel Massa (born 1985), Congolese soccer player
- Chancel Mbemba (born 1994), Congolese soccer player
- Chancel Ndaye (born 1999), Burundian soccer player
- Chancel Ilunga Sankuru (born 1995), Congolese middle distance runner

== See also ==
- Cancel (disambiguation)
- Chancellor (disambiguation)
