= Null symbol =

Null symbol may refer to:

- Null character, U+0000 <control-0000> ,
- Null sign (∅), the empty set
- Null (SQL) (ω), a special marker and keyword NULL in SQL
- Empty string (λ, Λ, or ε), in formal language theory

== See also ==
- Null (disambiguation)
- Ø (disambiguation)
- Dotted circle – Non-significant typographic character (U+25CC ◌ DOTTED CIRCLE)
