= Cancel =

Cancel, cancellation, canceled, or cancelled may refer to:

== Business ==
- Project cancellation, in government and industry
- Cancellation (mail), a postal marking applied to a stamp or stationery indicating the item has been used
- Cancellation (insurance), the termination of an insurance policy
- Flight cancellation and delay, not operating a scheduled flight

== Sociology ==
- Cancel culture, boycotting and ostracism calling out offensive behavior on social media or in real life

== Technology and science ==
- Cancel leaf, a bibliographic term for replaced leaves in printed books
- Cancellation property, the mathematical property if a×b = a×c then b = c
  - Cancelling out, a technique for simplifying mathematical expressions
- Catastrophic cancellation, numerical error arising from subtracting approximations to nearby numbers
- Noise cancellation, a method for reducing unwanted sound
- Phase cancellation, the effect of two waves that are out of phase with each other being summed
- Cancel message, a special message used to remove Usenet articles posted to news servers
- Cancel character, an indication that transmitted data are in error or are to be disregarded
- Resolution rule, in propositional logic a valid inference rule that produces a new clause by two clauses containing complementary literals.
- Cancellable (linguistics), a property of implicatures and presuppositions

== Entertainment ==
- Cancellation (television), the termination of a television series
- "Cancelled" (South Park), a 2003 episode of the TV series South Park
- Cancelled (Shameless), an episode of the American TV series Shameless
- "Canceled" (Nikita), a 2013 episode of Nikita
- Canceled (film), a Swedish horror film

=== Music ===
- "Canceled" (song), a 2020 song by Larray
- Cancelled (EP), a 2024 EP by Mötley Crüe
- "Cancelled!", a 2025 song by Taylor Swift from the album The Life of a Showgirl
- "Cancelled", a 2020 song by Kiana Ledé from the album Kiki
- "Cancelled", a 2021 song by Slowthai from the album Tyron
- "Cancelled", a 2021 song by Attila from the album Closure

== People and characters ==
- Robinson Cancel (born 1976), baseball catcher
- Rafael Cancel Miranda (born 1930), political activist
- An alternate name for the archangel Camael

== Government ==
- Cancellation of removal, a form of immigration relief available to aliens in the United States who be otherwise inadmissible or deportable
- Cancellation of nationality

== See also ==
- Mitigation
- Nullification (disambiguation)
