= 0° =

0° or 0 degrees may refer to:

- Longitude of the prime meridian on any planet or moon
  - For most of the 20th century on Earth, the prime meridian (Greenwich)
  - IERS Reference Meridian, the modern reference meridian for time and global navigation on Earth
- Latitude of the equator
- Freezing point of water (Celsius)
- Absolute zero, the lower limit of the thermodynamic temperature scale (Kelvins)
- 0 degrees Fahrenheit, approximately -17.78 degrees Celsius

== See also ==
- 0 (disambiguation)
