= Ø (disambiguation) =

Ø (and ø) is a Scandinavian vowel letter.

The letter Ø or the symbol ∅ (a circle crossed by a diagonal slash) etc. may also refer to:

== Language ==
- Close-mid front rounded vowel (IPA: ø)
- Zero (linguistics) (∅)
- Berber Academy yah (ⵁ), a Tifinagh letter, corresponding to "h"

== Science, technology and engineering ==
- Slashed zero, a representation of the digit 0 (zero) to distinguish it from the letter O
- Slashed letter 'O' (O̸), a representation of the letter O to distinguish it from the digit 0 (zero)
- Diameter (⌀), U+2300 in Unicode
- The symbol to represent a phenyl group
- Empty set ($\varnothing$ or $\emptyset$ as a character) in mathematical set theory, U+2205 in Unicode

== Other uses ==
- Ø, Denmark, a piece of land in Jutland, Denmark
- Half-diminished seventh chord (^{ø}), in music
- Ø, the solo identity of Finnish musician Mika Vainio of electronic music band Pan Sonic
- Ø, the 2021 EP by British alt-rock band Blood Red Shoes

== Similar symbols ==
=== Circle with a diagonal slash ===
- Circled division slash (⊘), U+2298 in Unicode
- No symbol, a similar symbol used to mark "no" or opposition to something
- The logo for Grok AI

=== Circle crossed by a vertical bar ===
- Voiceless bilabial fricative (IPA: ɸ)
- Phi (Φ and φ), a Greek letter, corresponding to "f" or "ph"
  - Several uses of phi as a symbol for angles, etc.
- Ef (Cyrillic) (Ф and ф), a Cyrillic letter, corresponding to "f" or "ph"

=== Circle with a vertical bar ===
- Yah (ⵀ), a Tifinagh letter, corresponding to "h" or "b"

=== Circle with a horizontal bar ===
- Voiceless dental fricative (IPA: θ)
- Theta (Θ and θ), a Greek letter, corresponding to "th"
- Theta nigrum (ꝋ) for "obiit" ="died"
- Fita (Ѳ and ѳ), an Old Cyrillic letter, corresponding to "f" and transliterating Greek theta
- Oe (Cyrillic) (Ө and ө), Cyrillic barred O, representing an open-mid front rounded vowel in some Turkic and Mongolic languages
- Yab (ⴱ), a Tifinagh letter, corresponding to "b"
- Load line mark, showing the maximum draft of a ship
- Standard state, in chemistry

=== APL syntax and symbols ===
- ⍉
- ⊖ (disambiguation)
- ⌽

== See also ==
- Circle symbol (disambiguation)
- Null (disambiguation)
- Null symbol (disambiguation)
- Barred O (disambiguation)
- 0 (disambiguation)
