= List of Unicode circle symbols =

Unicode provides various circle symbols.

- U+004F O LATIN CAPITAL LETTER O
- U+0FCA ࿊ TIBETAN SYMBOL NOR BU NYIS -KHYIL
- U+20DD ◌⃝ COMBINING ENCLOSING CIRCLE
- U+20E0 ◌⃠ COMBINING ENCLOSING CIRCLE BACKSLASH
- U+2205 ∅ EMPTY SET
- U+2218 ∘ RING OPERATOR
- U+2295 ⊕ CIRCLED PLUS
- U+2296 ⊖ CIRCLED MINUS
- U+2297 ⊗ CIRCLED TIMES
- U+2298 ⊘ CIRCLED DIVISION SLASH
- U+2299 ⊙ CIRCLED DOT OPERATOR
- U+229A ⊚ CIRCLED RING OPERATOR
- U+229B ⊛ CIRCLED ASTERISK OPERATOR
- U+229C ⊜ CIRCLED EQUALS
- U+229D ⊝ CIRCLED DASH
- U+233E ⌾ APL FUNCTIONAL SYMBOL CIRCLE JOT
- U+25C9 ◉ FISHEYE
- U+25CB ○ WHITE CIRCLE
- U+25CC ◌ DOTTED CIRCLE
- U+25CD ◍ CIRCLE WITH VERTICAL FILL
- U+25CE ◎ BULLSEYE
- U+25CF ● BLACK CIRCLE
- U+25D0 ◐ CIRCLE WITH LEFT HALF BLACK
- U+25D1 ◑ CIRCLE WITH RIGHT HALF BLACK
- U+25D2 ◒ CIRCLE WITH LOWER HALF BLACK
- U+25D3 ◓ CIRCLE WITH UPPER HALF BLACK
- U+25D4 ◔ CIRCLE WITH UPPER RIGHT QUADRANT BLACK
- U+25D5 ◕ CIRCLE WITH ALL BUT UPPER LEFT QUADRANT BLACK
- U+25D6 ◖ LEFT HALF BLACK CIRCLE
- U+25D7 ◗ RIGHT HALF BLACK CIRCLE
- U+25D8 ◘ INVERSE BULLET
- U+25D9 ◙ INVERSE WHITE CIRCLE
- U+25DA ◚ UPPER HALF INVERSE WHITE CIRCLE
- U+25DB ◛ LOWER HALF INVERSE WHITE CIRCLE
- U+25DC ◜ UPPER LEFT QUADRANT CIRCULAR ARC
- U+25DD ◝ UPPER RIGHT QUADRANT CIRCULAR ARC
- U+25DE ◞ LOWER RIGHT QUADRANT CIRCULAR ARC
- U+25DF ◟ LOWER LEFT QUADRANT CIRCULAR ARC
- U+25E0 ◠ UPPER HALF CIRCLE
- U+25E1 ◡ LOWER HALF CIRCLE
- U+25E6 ◦ WHITE BULLET
- U+25EF ◯ LARGE CIRCLE
- U+2622 ☢ RADIOACTIVE SIGN
- U+262E ☮ PEACE SYMBOL
- U+262F ☯ YIN YANG
- U+267C ♼ RECYCLED PAPER SYMBOL
- U+267D ♽ PARTIALLY-RECYCLED PAPER SYMBOL
- U+267E ♾ PERMANENT PAPER SIGN
- U+2686 ⚆ WHITE CIRCLE WITH DOT RIGHT
- U+2687 ⚇ WHITE CIRCLE WITH TWO DOTS
- U+2688 ⚈ BLACK CIRCLE WITH WHITE DOT RIGHT
- U+2689 ⚉ BLACK CIRCLE WITH TWO WHITE DOTS
- U+26AA ⚪ MEDIUM WHITE CIRCLE
- U+26AB ⚫ MEDIUM BLACK CIRCLE
- U+26AD ⚭ MARRIAGE SYMBOL
- U+26AE ⚮ DIVORCE SYMBOL
- U+26AF ⚯ UNMARRIED PARTNERSHIP SYMBOL
- U+26BE ⚾ BASEBALL
- U+26D4 ⛔ NO ENTRY
- U+2706 ✆ TELEPHONE LOCATION SIGN
- U+2742 ❂ CIRCLED OPEN CENTRE EIGHT POINTED STAR
- U+274D ❍ SHADOWED WHITE CIRCLE
- U+2940 ⥀ ANTICLOCKWISE CLOSED CIRCLE ARROW
- U+2941 ⥁ CLOCKWISE CLOSED CIRCLE ARROW
- U+29B9 ⦹ CIRCLED PERPENDICULAR
- U+29BA ⦺ CIRCLE DIVIDED BY HORIZONTAL BAR AND TOP HALF DIVIDED BY VERTICAL BAR
- U+29BC ⦼ CIRCLED ANTICLOCKWISE-ROTATED DIVISION SIGN
- U+29BD ⦽ UP ARROW THROUGH CIRCLE
- U+29BE ⦾ CIRCLED WHITE BULLET
- U+29BF ⦿ CIRCLED BULLET
- U+29C0 ⧀ CIRCLED LESS-THAN
- U+29C1 ⧁ CIRCLED GREATER-THAN
- U+29C2 ⧂ CIRCLE WITH SMALL CIRCLE TO THE RIGHT
- U+29C3 ⧃ CIRCLE WITH TWO HORIZONTAL STROKES TO THE RIGHT
- U+29EC ⧬ WHITE CIRCLE WITH DOWN ARROW
- U+29ED ⧭ BLACK CIRCLE WITH DOWN ARROW
- U+29F2 ⧲ ERROR-BARRED WHITE CIRCLE
- U+29F3 ⧳ ERROR-BARRED BLACK CIRCLE
- U+2A37 ⨷ MULTIPLICATION SIGN IN DOUBLE CIRCLE
- U+2A38 ⨸ CIRCLED DIVISION SIGN
- U+2B24 ⬤ BLACK LARGE CIRCLE
- U+2B55 ⭕ HEAVY LARGE CIRCLE
- U+3007 〇 IDEOGRAPHIC NUMBER ZERO
- U+3036 〶 CIRCLED POSTAL MARK
- U+FF2F Ｏ FULLWIDTH LATIN CAPITAL LETTER O
- U+1F3AF 🎯 DIRECT HIT
- U+1F518 🔘 RADIO BUTTON
- U+1F534 🔴 LARGE RED CIRCLE
- U+1F535 🔵 LARGE BLUE CIRCLE

== See also ==
- Circle symbol (disambiguation)
