= Nullity =

Nullity may refer to:

- Legal nullity, something without legal significance
- Nullity (conflict), a legal declaration that no marriage had ever come into being

== Mathematics ==
- Nullity (linear algebra), the dimension of the kernel of a mathematical operator or null space of a matrix
- Nullity (graph theory), the nullity of the adjacency matrix of a graph
- Nullity, the difference between the size and rank of a subset in a matroid
- Nullity, a concept in wheel theory denoted by ⊥, or similarly in transreal arithmetic denoted by Φ.

== See also ==
- Null
- Nullification
