= W0 =

W0 may refer to:

- Nominal day, ignoring the variation followed via the Equation of Time, a variable in the equations of Arthur Thomas Doodson
- A variable for a word in the PICAXE microcontroller
- Short Run Consumption Function, the initial endowed wealth level of a particular individual in the Life-cycle Income Hypothesis
- First step of the W0–W6 scale for the classification of meteorites by weathering
- W_{0} may refer to the principal branch of the Lambert W Function

== See also ==
- 0W (disambiguation)
