= Circled plus =

Circled plus (⊕) or n-ary circled plus (⨁) (in Unicode, U+2295 ⊕ CIRCLED PLUS, U+2A01 ⨁ N-ARY CIRCLED PLUS OPERATOR) may refer to:

- Sun cross, a circle containing four or more spokes with many variants and uses
- Earth symbol, astronomical and alchemical symbols for Earth, indicated by U+1F728 🜨 ALCHEMICAL SYMBOL FOR VERDIGRIS
- Coptic cross, associated with Coptic Christians
- Celtic cross, associated with Celtic Christianity in the Early Middle Ages
- Crosses in heraldry, including U+1F540 🕀 CIRCLED CROSS POMMEE, U+1F902 🤂 CIRCLED CROSS FORMEE and variants thereof

== Mathematics and computing ==
- Direct sum, an operation from abstract algebra
- Dilation (morphology), mathematical morphology
- Tensor product, a mathematical operation indicated by U+2297 ⊗ CIRCLED TIMES
- Exclusive or, a logical operation that outputs true only when inputs differ

== Languages ==
- Linear A, an undeciphered Minoan script including the character U+1063E 𐘾 LINEAR A SIGN AB077
- Linear B, a syllabary used for writing Mycenaean Greek including the characters U+1000F 𐀏 LINEAR B SYLLABLE B077 KA and U+100CF 𐃏 LINEAR B IDEOGRAM B243 WHEEL
- Carian alphabets, including the character U+102A8 𐊨 CARIAN LETTER Q
- Teth, Phoenician letter U+10908 𐤈 PHOENICIAN LETTER TET
- Tifinagh, a Berber script including the letter U+2D32 ⴲ TIFINAGH LETTER YABH

== Other uses ==
- The Zodiac Killer used a cross-circle as a signature for his letters

== See also ==
- List of screw drives
- ⊖ (disambiguation)
