= Barred O =

Barred O may refer to:

- Ɵ (Ɵ ɵ), a letter of the African reference alphabet. The minuscule is also use for the close-mid central rounded vowel.
- Oe (Cyrillic) (Ө ө), a letter of the Cyrillic alphabet.

== See also ==
- Ѳ ѳ : Cyrillic letter Fita
- Θ θ/ϑ : Greek letter Theta
- Ø : Scandinavian letter Ø
