= Nullification =

Nullification may refer to:

- Nullification (U.S. law), a legal theory that a state has the right to nullify any federal law deemed unconstitutional with respect to the United States Constitution
  - Nullification crisis, the 1832 confrontation between the U.S. government and South Carolina over the latter's attempt to nullify a federal law
    - Ordinance of Nullification, declared the Tariffs of 1828 and 1832 null and void within the state borders of South Carolina
- Jury nullification, a legal term for a jury's ability to deliver a verdict knowingly in contradiction to written law
- Genital nullification, a surgical procedure that entirely removes the genitals

== See also ==
- Annihilation (disambiguation)
- Cancel (disambiguation)
- Nullity
