= Canceled (film) =

2023 horror film

- Poster
- Directed by: Oskar Mellander
- Starring: Fanny Klefelt; Vincent Grahl; Felicia Kartal
- Release date: 2023
- Running time: 99 minutes
- Country: Sweden
- Language: Swedish

Canceled is a Swedish horror film, released to cinemas on 25 August 2023. It is distributed by Nordisk Film.

== Plot ==
Alex hosts and produces the show ”Gone Ghosting”, after faking several ghost encounters and treating members of his production team badly he gets canceled and loses his sponsorships. To redeem his reputation he and his team decides to film inside an abandoned mansion where a man inexplicably murdered his entire family before committing suicide in the 1970s.
