= ⊖ =

⊖ is the Unicode character "circled minus" (U+2296). ⊖ is also known as the Plimsoll symbol. ⊖ may refer to:

- Symmetric difference, the set of elements which are in either of two sets but not in their intersection
- Erosion (morphology), one of the fundamental operations in morphological image processing
- A function for reversal and rotation in the APL programming language
- Symbol for the Escape character in ISO 2047
- Used to designate a thermodynamic quantity in the Standard state in chemistry
- Part of the notation for Standard enthalpy of reaction, as in ΔH^{⊖}_{reaction}

== See also ==
- Celtic cross
- Coptic cross
- Cross symbol
- Theta
- Ø (disambiguation)
- Circled plus (disambiguation)
- ⦵ (U+29B5, CIRCLE WITH HORIZONTAL BAR)
- Mathematical Operators (Unicode block)
