= Superior letter =

Typographical element

In typography and handwriting, a superior letter is a lower-case letter placed above the baseline and made smaller than ordinary text, but is designed individually and generally shaped slightly thicker to be more visually harmonious, rather than made simply by automation of software shrinking and raising a standard character the way that generic modern superscripts on word processors tend to do. Formerly quite common in abbreviations, the original purpose of superior letters, as with other superior glyphs such as superior figures, was to make handwritten abbreviations clearly distinct from normal words. Superior glyphs were also used on road signage when space was limited.

With the advent of printing, pieces of type were cast to enable them to appear in print. These are still commonly used in French, Italian, Portuguese and Spanish, though their appearance in English has diminished. Not every letter in the alphabet has a piece of type cast for it as a superior letter. In the book Thinking in Type, by Alex W. White, it is stated that there are only twelve superior letters used in French and Spanish: a, b, d, e, i, l, m, n, o, r, s, and t. However, a few other superior letters are also used in those languages, for example in English, h is also sometimes rendered as a superior letter, or in French, superior g is used in some abbreviations (See below).

== Use in French ==
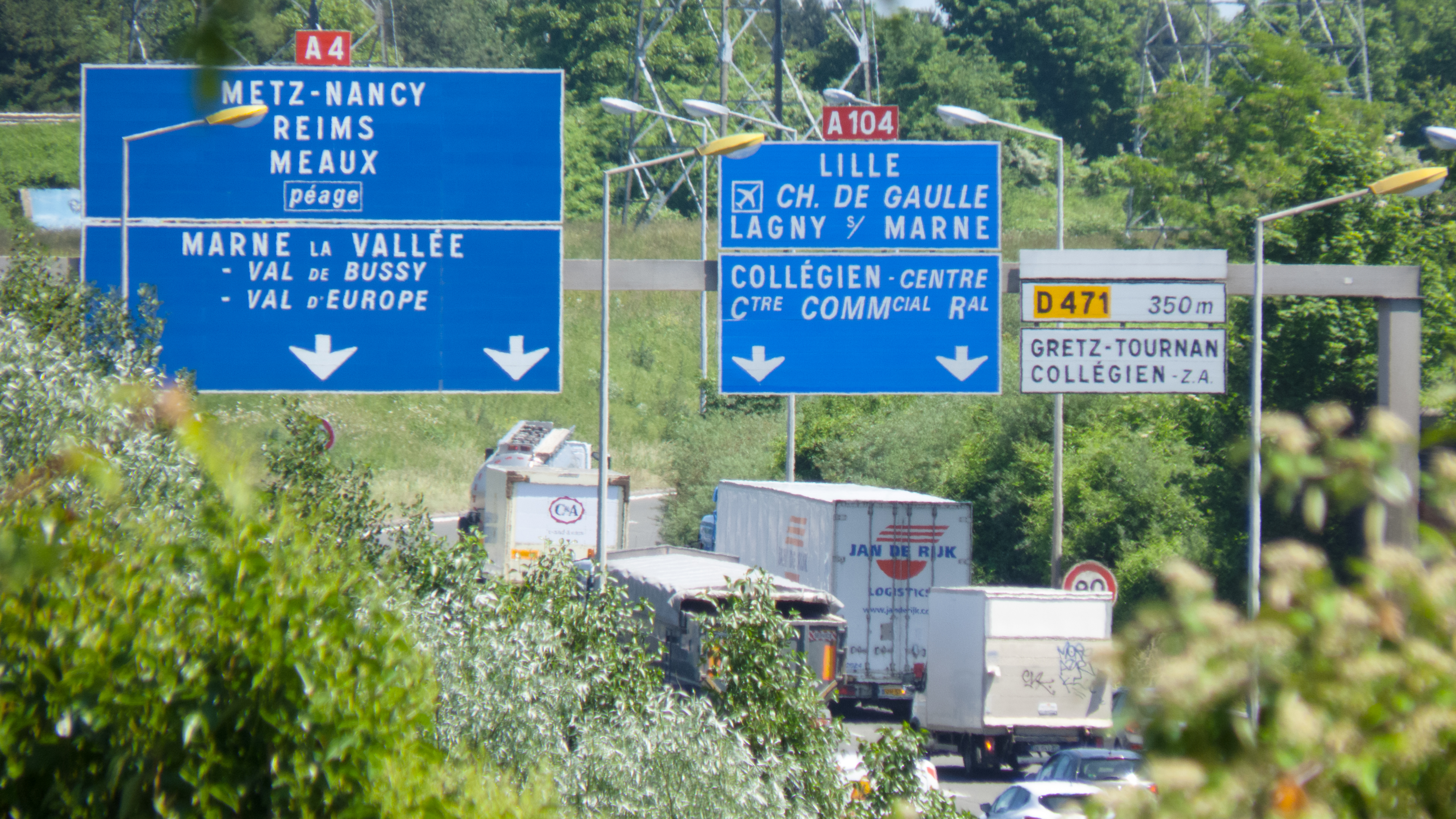
A directional road sign in France abbreviating sur as ^{s}/, Centre as C^{tre}, Commercial as Comm^{cial}, and Régional as R^{al}

In French, certain abbreviations are written with the first letter(s) of the word they represent, followed by the final letter(s) in superscript. The superscript in this case is sometimes optional. Most commonly, this appears in the abbreviations of personal titles: M^{gr} (or Mgr) stands for monseigneur ('Your Grace'), M^{lle} (or Mlle) for mademoiselle ('Miss'), M^{e} for maître ('Maestro'), etc. Other abbreviations containing superior letters are m^{dise} for marchandise ('merchandise'), éch^{ce} for échéance ('due date'), and M^{o} for métro ('subway').

When ordinal numbers are abbreviated, superscript letters are generally used:

- premier: 1^{er} ('first')
- vingtième siècle: XX^{e} siècle ('twentieth century')
- quatre centième: 400^{e} ('four hundredth')
- énième: N^{ième} ('nth')

== Use in Spanish ==
In Spanish, they are known as letras voladas ('flying letters', in Spain) or voladitas (lit. 'little flying' letters). At present, these letters are usually not underlined, though underlining them is acceptable. It is ruled that a period must be added immediately before them, though this norm is often ignored.

Superior letters are used to shorten various words in order to save space: f.^{o} (folio 'page'); titles: D.^{a} (doña 'Lady, Ms.'); personal compound given names: M.^{a} Cristina (María Cristina) and regular administrative expressions: imp.^{to} (impuesto 'tax').

For singular ordinal numbers, shortened forms use the feminine (ª) and masculine (º) ordinal indicators, rather than the superscript ^{a} and ^{o}, except in ordinal numbers ending in -er (only before masculine singular sustantives for ordinal numbers whose cardinal equivalent finishes in 1 and 3, except with the 11.º variant spelled undécimo).

- primera: 1.ª, primero: 1.º, primer: 1.^{er} ('first')
- segunda: 2.ª, segundo: 2.º, segundo: 2.^{do} ('second')
- tercera: 3.ª, tercero: 3.º, tercer: 3.^{er} ('third')
- vigésima primera: 21.ª, vigésimo primero: 21.º, vigésimo primer: 21.^{er} ('twenty-first')
- vigésima quinta: 25.ª, vigésimo quinto: 25.º ('twenty-fifth')

For plural ordinal numbers, shortened forms use the superscript ^{as} and ^{os}:

- primeras: 1.^{as}, primeros: 1.^{os} ('firsts')
- segundas: 2.^{as}, segundos: 2.^{os} ('seconds')
- terceras: 3.^{as}, terceros: 3.^{os} ('thirds')
- vigésimas quintas: 25.^{as}, vigésimos quintos: 25.^{os} ('twenty-fifths')

== Use in English ==
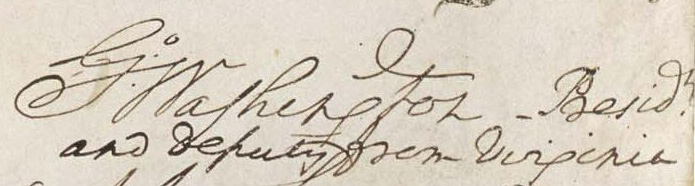
Signature of George Washington on the United States Constitution with superior letters, reading G^{o}. Washington—Presid^{t}. and deputy from Virginia.

In English, superior letters are reserved for use with ordinal numerals, as in 1^{st}, 2^{nd}, 3^{rd}, etc. However, this use is not mandatory and not always preferred: 1st, 2nd, 3rd, etc. are also accepted abbreviations of ordinal numerals.

Previously, in English-speaking countries, abbreviations of given names were used for recordkeeping. Today, their use is very uncommon, and they are generally only found in historical records. These abbreviations sometimes employed superior letters; for example, Alex^{r} for Alexander, Nic^{s} for Nicholas.

== Masculine and feminine ordinal indicators ==
Most typewriters for Spanish and other Romance languages had keys that could enter ^{o} and ^{a} directly, as a shorthand intended to be used primarily with ordinal numbers, such as 1.^{o} for first.

In computing, early 8-bit character sets such as code page 437 for the original IBM PC (circa 1981) also had these characters. In ISO-8859-1 Latin-1, and later in Unicode, they were assigned to and are known as U+00AA FEMININE ORDINAL INDICATOR (ª) and U+00BA MASCULINE ORDINAL INDICATOR (º). Here, "feminine" and "masculine" refer to grammatical gender. In Spanish, Portuguese, Galician and Italian, gender is usually distinguished by the suffixes -a and -o. These ordinal indicators are now distinct from the superior ^{o} and ^{a} characters. Apart from Microsoft's Calibri or Cambria, in most of the commonly available computer fonts today, ordinal indicators are not underlined.

== Numero sign ==
One abbreviation using a superior letter, the numero sign, has been given its own character: №. Originally, this was just another use of a superior ^{o}, abbreviating numero, the word for 'number' in several Romance languages. It often appears in English, as in "№ 2 pencil" for "number-two pencil".

In Unicode, it is assigned to character U+2116 № NUMERO SIGN within the Letterlike Symbols block.

== Phonetic transcription ==
Several superior letters are used in phonetic transcription systems. The International Phonetic Alphabet uses the superscript n ⁿ for nasal release, the superscript w ʷ to indicate labialized or labio-velarized consonants, the superscript h ʰ for aspirated consonants, the superscript j ʲ for palatalized consonants, the superscript gamma ᵞ for velarized consonants, the superscript turned h ᶣ for labio-palatalized consonants, the superscript reversed glottal stop for pharyngealized consonants, the superscript glottal stop is used for glottalized but pulmonic sonorants, such as [mˀ], [lˀ], [wˀ], [aˀ]. Other superscript letters are used as an alternative way to represent double articulated consonants, for example [tˢ] for [t͡s].

== See also ==
- Subscript and superscript
- Unicode subscripts and superscripts
- Ordinal indicator
- Degree symbol
