= Subscript and superscript =

Character set slightly below and above the normal line of type, respectively

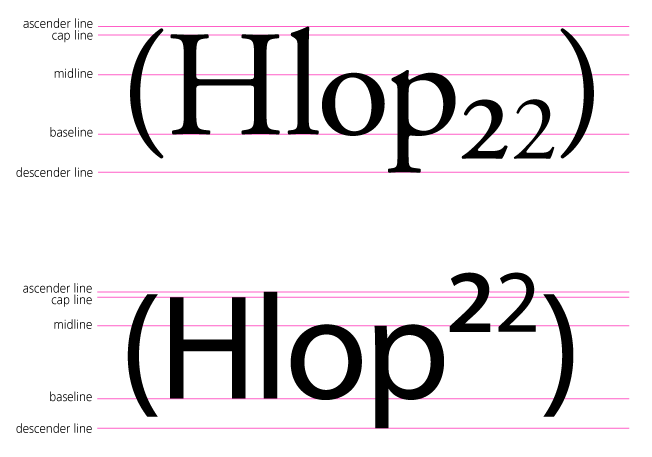
Example of subscript and superscript. In each example the first "2" is professionally designed, and is included as part of the glyph set; the second "2" is a manual approximation using a small version of the standard "2". The visual weight of the first "2" matches the other characters better. (The top typeface is Adobe Garamond Pro; the size of the subscript is about 62% of the original characters, dropped below the baseline by about 16%. The second typeface is Myriad Pro; the superscript is about 60% of the original characters, raised by about 44% above the baseline.)

A subscript or superscript is a character (such as a number or letter) that is set slightly below or above the normal line of type, respectively. It is usually smaller than the rest of the text. Subscripts appear at or below the baseline, while superscripts are above. Subscripts and superscripts are often used in formulas, mathematical expressions, and specifications of chemical compounds and isotopes, but have many other uses as well.

In professional typography, subscript and superscript characters are not simply ordinary characters reduced in size; to keep them visually consistent with the rest of the font, typeface designers make them slightly heavier (i.e. medium or bold typography) than a reduced-size character would be. The vertical distance that sub- or superscripted text is moved from the original baseline varies by typeface and by use.

In typesetting, such types are traditionally called "superior" and "inferior" letters, figures, etc., or just "superiors" and "inferiors". In English, most nontechnical use of superiors is archaic. Superior and inferior figures on the baseline are used for fractions and most other purposes, while lowered inferior figures are needed for chemical and mathematical subscripts.

== Uses ==
The four common locations of subscripts and superscripts. The typeface is Liberation Sans.

A single typeface may contain sub- and superscript glyphs at different positions for different uses. The four most common positions are listed here. Because each position is used in different contexts, not all alphanumerics may be available in all positions. For example, subscript letters on the baseline are quite rare, and many typefaces provide only a limited number of superscripted letters. Despite these differences, all reduced-size glyphs go by the same generic terms subscript and superscript, which are synonymous with the terms inferior letter (or number) and superior letter (or number), respectively. Most fonts that contain superscript/subscript will have predetermined size and orientation that is dependent on the design of the font.

=== Subscripts that are dropped below the baseline ===
Subscripts are used in chemical formulas. For example, the chemical formula for glucose is C_{6}H_{12}O_{6} (meaning that it is a molecule with 6 carbon atoms, 12 hydrogen atoms and 6 oxygen atoms). The chemical formula of the water molecule, H_{2}O, indicates that it contains two hydrogen atoms and one oxygen atom.

A subscript is also used to distinguish between different versions of a subatomic particle. Thus electron, muon, and tau neutrinos are denoted ν_{e} ν_{μ} and ν_{τ}. A particle may be distinguished by multiple subscripts, such as Ω^{−}_{bbb} for the triple bottom omega particle.

Similarly, subscripts are also used frequently in mathematics to define different versions of the same variable: for example, in an equation x_{0} and x_{f} might indicate the initial and final value of x, while v_{rocket} and v_{observer} would stand for the velocities of a rocket and an observer. Commonly, variables with a zero in the subscript are referred to as the variable name followed by "nought" (e.g. v_{0} would be read, "v-nought").

Subscripts are often used to refer to members of a mathematical sequence or set or elements of a vector. For example, in the sequence O = (45, −2, 800), O_{3} refers to the third member of sequence O, which is 800.

Also in mathematics and computing, a subscript can be used to represent the radix, or base, of a written number, especially where multiple bases are used alongside each other. For example, comparing values in hexadecimal, denary, and octal one might write C_{hex} = 12_{dec} = 14_{oct}.

Subscripted numbers dropped below the baseline are also used for the denominators of stacked fractions, like this: 67/68.

=== Subscripts that are aligned with the baseline ===
Subscripts aligned with the baseline are commonly used for the denominators of diagonal fractions, like ½ or the signs for percent %, permille ‰, and basis point ‱. Certain standard abbreviations are also composed as diagonal fractions, such as ℅ (care of), ℀ (account of), ℁ (addressed to the subject), or in Spanish ℆ (cada uno/una, "each one").

=== Superscripts that typically do not extend above the ascender line ===
These superscripts typically share a baseline with numerator digits, the top of which are aligned with the top of the full-height numerals of the base font; lowercase ascenders may extend above.

Ordinal indicators are sometimes written as superscripts (1^{st}, 2^{nd}, 3^{rd}, 4^{th}, rather than 1st, 2nd, 3rd, 4th), although many English-language style guides recommend against this use. Romance languages use a similar convention, such as 1^{er} or 2^{e} in French, 4ª and 4º in Galician, Brazilian Portuguese and Italian, or 4.ª and 4.º in European Portuguese and Spanish.

In medieval manuscripts, many superscript as well as subscript signs were used to abbreviate text. From these developed modern diacritical marks (glyphs, or "accents" placed above or below the letter). Also, in early Middle High German, umlauts and other modifications to pronunciation would be indicated by superscript letters placed directly above the letter they modified. Thus the modern umlaut ü was written as uͤ. Both vowels and consonants were used in this way, as in ſheͨzze and boͮsen. In modern typefaces, these letters are usually smaller than other superscripts, and their baseline is slightly above the base font's midline, making them extend no higher than a typical ordinal indicator.

Superscripts are used for the standard abbreviations for service mark (℠) and trademark (™). The signs for copyright © and registered trademark ® are also sometimes superscripted, depending on the typeface or house style.

On handwritten documents and signs, a monetary amount may be written with the cents value superscripted, as in $8⁰⁰ or 8€⁵⁰. Often the superscripted numbers are underlined: $8~~⁰⁰~~, 8€~~⁵⁰~~. The currency symbol itself may also be superscripted, as in ^{$}80 or 6^{¢}.There is no ruling whether or not these characters need to be supercript, or made smaller than the numbers, or aligned to any of the various guide lines. That of course is decided by the preference of the typographer.

=== Superscripts that typically extend above the ascender line ===
Both low and high superscripts can be used to indicate the presence of a footnote in a document, like this^{5} or this.^{xi} Any combination of characters can be used for this purpose; in technical writing footnotes are sometimes composed of letters and numbers together, like this.^{A.2} The choice of low or high alignment depends on taste, but high-set footnotes tend to be more common, as they stand out more from the text.

In mathematics, high superscripts are used for exponentiation to indicate that one number or variable is raised to the power of another number or variable. Thus y^{4} is y raised to the fourth power, 2^{x} is 2 raised to the power of x, and the equation E = mc^{2} includes a term for the speed of light squared. This led over time to an "abuse of notation" whereby superscripts indicate iterative function composition, including derivatives. In an unrelated use, superscripts also indicate contravariant tensors in Ricci calculus.

The charges of ions and subatomic particles are also denoted by superscripts. Cl^{−} is a negatively charged chlorine atom, Pb^{4+} is an atom of lead with a positive charge of four, e^{−} is an electron, e^{+} is a positron, and μ^{+} is an antimuon.

Atomic isotopes are written using superscripts. In symbolic form, the number of nucleons is denoted as a superscripted prefix to the chemical symbol (for example ^{3}He, ^{12}C, ^{13}C, ^{131}I, and ^{238}U). The letters m or f may follow the number to indicate metastable or fission isomers, as in ^{58m}Co or ^{240f}Pu.

Subscripts and superscripts can also be used together to give more specific information about nuclides. For example, ^{235}_{92}U denotes an atom of uranium with 235 nucleons, 92 of which are protons. A chemical symbol can be completely surrounded: ^{14}_{6}C^{2+}_{2} is a divalent cation of carbon with 14 nucleons, of which six are protons and 8 are neutrons, and there are two atoms in this chemical compound.

The numerators of stacked fractions (such as 34/35) usually use high-set superscripts, although some specially designed glyphs keep the top of the numerator aligned with the top of the full-height numerals.

== Alignment examples ==
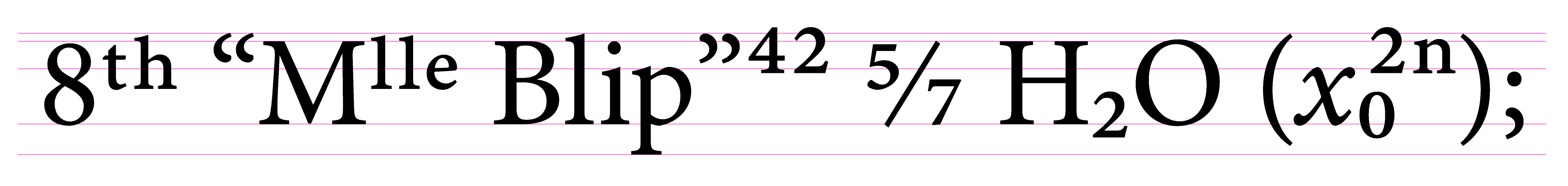

This image shows the four common locations for subscripts and superscripts, according to their typical uses. The typeface is Minion Pro, set in Adobe Illustrator. Note that the default superscripting algorithms of most word processors would set the "th" and "lle" too high, and the weight of all the subscript and superscript glyphs would be too light.

HTML subscripts and superscripts
X^{6} O_{8}M	X^{6} O_{8}M
Default subscript and superscript rendered in HTML for fonts in normal styles	Example of possible collision of italic styles in HTML

Another minor adjustment that is often omitted by renderers is the control of the direction of movement for superscripts and subscripts, when they do not lie on the baseline. Ideally this should allow for the font, e.g. italics are slanting; most renderers adjust the position only vertically and do not also shift it horizontally. This may create a collision with surrounding letters in the same italic font size. One can see an example of such collision on the right side when rendered in HTML (see the figure on the right). To avoid this, it is often desirable to insert a small positive horizontal margin (or a thin space) (on the left side of the first superscript character), or a negative margin (or a tiny backspace) before a subscript. It is more critical with glyphs from fonts in Oblique styles that are more slanted than those from fonts in Italic style, and some fonts reverse the direction of slanting, so there is no general solution except when the renderer takes into account the font metrics properties that specifies the angle of slanting,

However the same problem occurs more generally between spans of normal glyphs (non-superscript and non-subscript) when slanting styles are mixed.

== Software support ==
=== Desktop publishing ===
Many text editing and word processing programs have automatic subscripting and superscripting features, although these programs usually simply use ordinary characters reduced in size and moved up or down – rather than separately designed subscript or superscript glyphs. Professional typesetting programs such as QuarkXPress or Adobe InDesign also have similar features for automatically converting regular type to subscript or superscript. These programs, however, may also offer native OpenType support for the special subscript and superscript glyphs included in many professional typeface packages (such as those shown in the image above).

Comparison of software support
Software	OpenType support for professional glyphs?	Default values for glyph transformation (non-professional glyphs)				Keyboard shortcuts	
Software	OpenType support for professional glyphs?	Size	Subscript position	Superscript position	User-modifiable settings?	Superscript	Subscript
OpenOffice.org 3.3	No	58%	−33%	+33%	Yes	Ctrl+⇧ Shift+P	Ctrl+⇧ Shift+B
LibreOffice 5.3	Yes (Note: Available by typing a syntax consisting font name, feature tag and its value into Font Name area.)	58%	−33%	+33%	Yes	Ctrl+⇧ Shift+P	Ctrl+⇧ Shift+B
Microsoft Word 2015	Yes	50%	−14.1%	+40%	Manual (Note: Default subscript and superscript options can be overcome by manually changing the font size and raising/lowering text.)	Ctrl+⇧ Shift+=	Ctrl+=
Adobe Illustrator CS3	Yes	58.3%	−33.3%	+33.3%	Yes		
Adobe Photoshop CS3	Ordinal indicators only	58.3%	−33.3%	+33.3%	Manual	Alt+Ctrl+⇧ Shift+=	Ctrl+⇧ Shift+=
LaTeX	Yes (using XeLaTeX or LuaTeX only)	≈70% (Note: Dependent on math mode; differs for subsub- and supersuper-scripts.)	−14% (Note: Nominal values; dependent on fontdimen parameters (16 and 17).)	+25%	Manual (Note: Changing fontdimen values requires some skill the textual commands can be modified to use the \raisebox command.)		
Typst	Yes	60%	−20%	+50%	Yes		

=== HTML ===
In HTML and Wiki syntax, subscript text is produced by putting it inside the tags <sub> and </sub>. Similarly, superscripts are produced with <sup> and </sup>. The exact size and position of the resulting characters will vary by font and browser, but are usually reduced to around 75% original size.

=== TeX ===
In TeX's mathematics mode (as used in MediaWiki), subscripts are typeset with the underscore, while superscripts are made with the caret. Thus $X_{ab}$ produces $X_{ab}$, and $X^{ab}$ produces $X^{ab}$.

In LaTeX text mode the math method above is inappropriate, as letters will be in math italic, so the command n\textsuperscript{th} will give n^{th} and A\textsubscript{base} will give A_{base} (textual subscripts are rare, so \textsubscript is not built-in, but requires the fixltx2e package). As in other systems, when using UTF-8 encoding, the masculine º and feminine ª ordinal indicators can be used as characters, with no need to use a command.

In line with its origin as a superscript circle, the degree symbol (°) is composed by a superscript circle operator (∘). ^{\circ}.

Superscripts and subscripts of arbitrary height can be done with the \raisebox{<dimen>}{<text>} command: the first argument is the amount to raise, and the second is the text; a negative first argument will lower the text. In this case the text is not resized automatically, so a sizing command can be included, e.g. go\raisebox{1ex}{\large home}.

=== Unicode ===
Unicode defines subscript and superscript characters in several areas; in particular, it has a full set of superscript and subscript digits. Owing to the popularity of using these characters to make fractions, most modern fonts render most or all of these as cap height superscripts and baseline subscripts. The same font may align letters and numbers in different ways. Other than numbers, the set of super- and subscript letters and other symbols is incomplete and somewhat random, and many fonts do not contain them. Because of these inconsistencies, these glyphs may not be suitable for some purposes (see Uses, above).

=== OpenType ===
Several advanced features of OpenType typefaces are supported for professionally designed subscript and superscript glyphs. Exactly which glyphs are included varies by typeface; some have only basic support for numerals, while others contain a full set of letters, numerals, and punctuation. They can be available via activating subs or sups feature tag. These feature tags can be turned on if software environment support optional features. In addition, some other typefaces placed them in a Unicode Private Use Area.

== See also ==
- Mathematical notation
- Superior letter
- Furigana
- Ruby character
- Typesetting
- Font
- Superscripts and Subscripts (Unicode block)
- Unicode subscripts and superscripts

== Bibliography ==
- Bringhurst, Robert (2005), The Elements of Typographic Style, 3rd ed., Vancouver: Hartley and Marks, ISBN 0-88179-205-5.
