= Dotted circle =

Non-significant typographic character

◌

dotted circle
- U+25CC ◌ DOTTED CIRCLE

In Unicode, the dotted circle (◌) is a non-significant typographic character used to illustrate the effect of a combining mark, such as a diacritic mark. It can also be used to indicate a spot where a character is supposed to be, but it is rarely used for other purposes.

== Illustration ==
A Unicode combining mark combines with a preceding character. When used as stand-alone, it would combine unintentionally with a preceding character (possibly a space):

- Diacritic ̒ used alone between regular spaces
- Diacritic ◌̒ used after a character

Using the generic dotted circle character also shows the relative positioning of the diacritic.

== See also ==
- Unicode input
