= Zero width =

Zero width (also zero-width) refers to a non-printing character used in computer typesetting of some complex scripts:

  - Zero-width joiner
  - Zero-width non-joiner
  - Zero-width space
  - Zero-width no-break space
