= Ordinal indicator =

Character(s) following an ordinal number

◌ª | ◌ºo

Ordinal indicator (feminine | masculine)
- In Unicode: U+00AA ª FEMININE ORDINAL INDICATOR (&ordf;); U+00BA º MASCULINE ORDINAL INDICATOR (&ordm;)

Different from
- Different from: U+00B0 ° DEGREE SIGN; U+02DA ˚ RING ABOVE; U+030A ◌̊ COMBINING RING ABOVE; U+1D52 ᵒ MODIFIER LETTER SMALL O; U+1D3C ᴼ MODIFIER LETTER CAPITAL O; U+2070 ⁰ SUPERSCRIPT ZERO; U+1D43 ᵃ MODIFIER LETTER SMALL A

Related
- See also: U+2116 № NUMERO SIGN

In written languages, an ordinal indicator is a character, or group of characters, following a numeral denoting that it is an ordinal number, rather than a cardinal number. Historically these letters were "elevated terminals", that is to say the last few letters of the full word denoting the ordinal form of the number displayed as a superscript. Probably originating with medieval monastic practice, the character(s) used vary in different languages.

In English orthography, this corresponds to the suffixes ‑st, ‑nd, ‑rd, ‑th in written ordinals (represented either on the line 1st, 2nd, 3rd, 4th or as superscript 1^{st}, 2^{nd}, 3^{rd}, 4^{th}). Also commonly encountered in Romance languages are the superscript or superior (and often underlined) masculine ordinal indicator, º, and feminine ordinal indicator, ª. In formal typography, the ordinal indicators ª and º are distinguishable from other characters.

The practice of underlined (or doubly underlined) superscripted abbreviations was common in 19th-century writing (not limited to ordinal indicators in particular, and extant in the numero sign №), and was found in handwritten English until at least the late 19th century (e.g. first abbreviated 1^{st} or 1^{st}).

== Usage ==
In Spanish, Portuguese, Italian, and Galician, the ordinal indicators º and ª are appended to the numeral depending on whether the grammatical gender is masculine or feminine. The indicator may be given an underline but this is not ubiquitous. In digital typography, this depends on the font: Cambria and Calibri, for example, have underlined ordinal indicators, while most other fonts do not.

Examples of the usage of ordinal indicators in Italian are:

- 1º, primo; 1ª, prima "first"
- 2º, secondo; 2ª, seconda "second"
- 3º, terzo; 3ª, terza "third"

Galician also forms its ordinal numbers this way, while Asturian follows a similar system where ᵘ is used for the masculine gender, ª for the feminine gender and º for the neuter gender.

In Spanish, using the two final letters of the word as it is spelled is not allowed, except in the cases of primer (an apocope of primero) before singular masculine nouns, which is not abbreviated as 1.º but as 1.^{er}; of tercer (an apocope of tercero) before singular masculine nouns, which is not abbreviated as 3.º but as 3.^{er}; and of compound ordinal numbers ending in primer or tercer. For instance, "twenty-first" is vigésimo primer before a masculine noun, and its abbreviation is 21.^{er}. Since none of these words are shortened before feminine nouns, their correct forms for those cases are primera and tercera. These can be represented as 1.ª and 3.ª. As with other abbreviations in Spanish, the ordinal numbers have a period ".", which is placed before the indicator. Portuguese follows the same method of placing a period in abbreviations.

== Origins ==
The usage of terminal abbreviations in the written vernacular languages of Europe derives from the practice of scribes in monasteries and chanceries, where it was used in Latin texts before writing in the vernacular became established. The terminal letters used depend on the gender of the item to be ordered and the case in which the ordinal adjective is stated, for example primus dies ('the first day', nominative case, masculine), but primo die ('on the first day', ablative case masculine), shown as I^{o} or i^{o}. As monumental inscriptions often refer to days on which events happened (e.g., "he died on the tenth of June"), the ablative case is generally used: X^{o} (decimo) with the month stated in the genitive case. Examples:

- I^{o} (primo) die Julii "on the first day of July"
- X^{o} decimo
- XX^{o} vicensimo
- L^{o} quinquagesimo
- C^{o} centesimo
- M^{o} millesimo

== Design ==
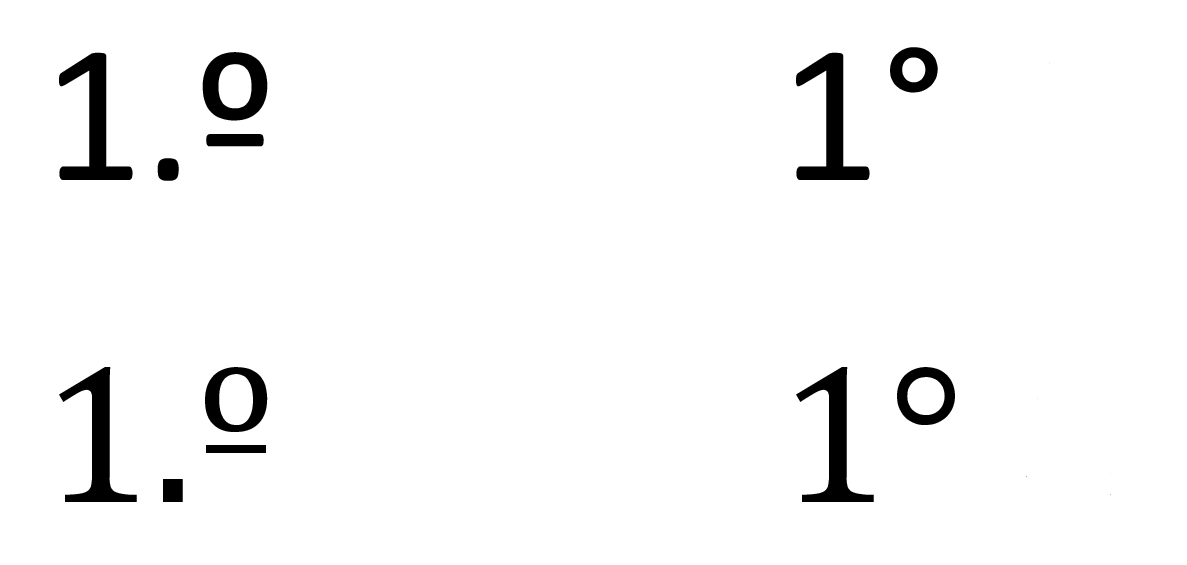
Comparison between the ordinal indicator (left) and the degree sign (right), in a monotone font and in a variable stroke width font.

The masculine ordinal indicator º may be confused with the degree sign ° (U+00B0), which looks very similar and which is provided on the Italian and Latin American keyboard layouts. It was common in the early days of computers to use the same character for both. The degree sign is a uniform circle and is never underlined. The masculine ordinal indicator is the shape of a lower-case letter o, and thus may be oval or elliptical, and may have a varying line thickness.

Ordinal indicators may also be underlined. It is not mandatory in Portugal nor in Brazil, but it is preferred in some fonts to avoid confusion with the degree sign.

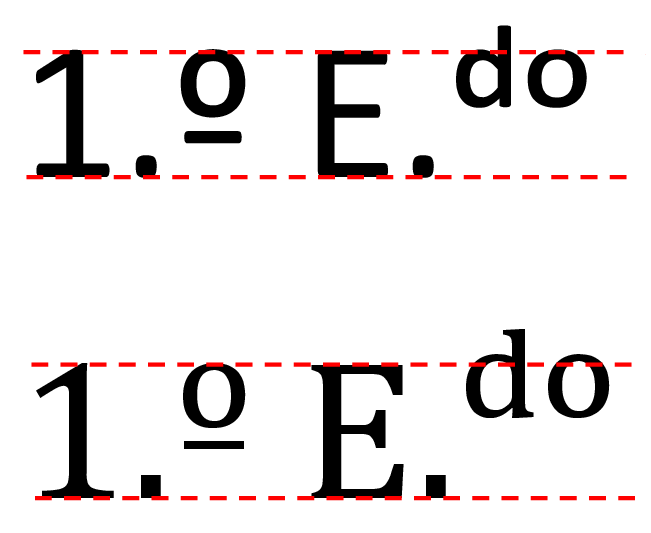
Alignment of the ordinal indicator (left) and superscript characters (right), in the Portuguese abbreviation 1.º E.^{do} (1st floor left), in a monotone font and in a variable stroke width font.

Also, the ordinal indicators should be distinguishable from superscript characters. The top of the ordinal indicators (i.e., the top of the elevated letter a and letter o) must be aligned with the cap height of the font. The alignment of the top of superscripted letters a and o will depend on the font.

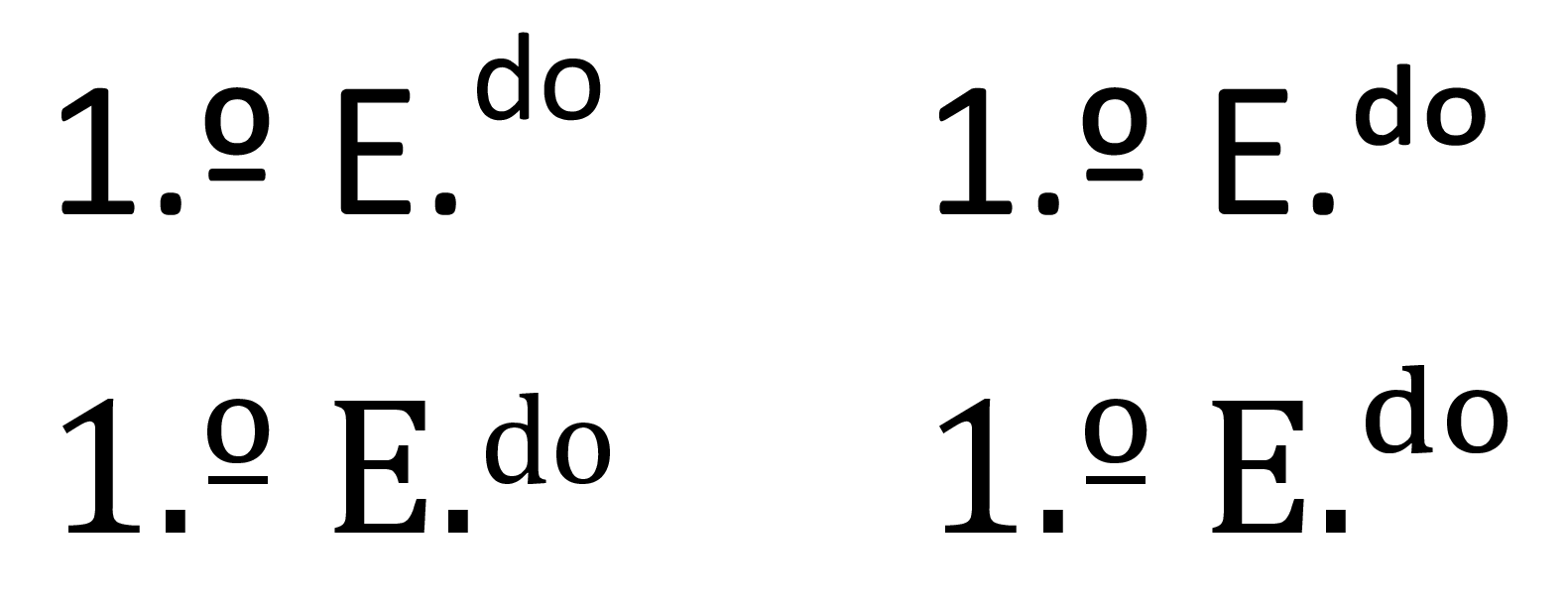
Comparison between ordinal indicator and superscript markup (left) and superscript characters (U+1D48 and U+1D52) (right), in the Portuguese abbreviation 1.º E.^{do} (1st floor left), in a monotone font and in a variable stroke width font.

The line thickness of the ordinal indicators is always proportional to the line thickness of the other characters of the font. Many fonts just shrink the characters (making them thinner) to draw superscripts.

== Encoding ==
The Romance feminine and masculine ordinal indicators were added to many 8-bit character sets designed to support European languages, such as CP437. In 1985 the ECMA-94 encoding ISO 8859-1 placed them at positions 170 (xAA) and 186 (xBA). ISO 8859-1 was incorporated as the first 256 code points of Unicode in 1991. The Unicode characters are thus:

- U+00AA ª FEMININE ORDINAL INDICATOR (&ordf;)
- U+00BA º MASCULINE ORDINAL INDICATOR (&ordm;)

There are superscript versions of the letters ⟨a⟩ and ⟨o⟩ in Unicode; these are different characters and should not be used as ordinal indicators.

== Typing ==
Portuguese and Spanish keyboard layouts are the only ones on which the characters are directly accessible through a dedicated key: º for "º" and ⇧ Shift+º for "ª". On other keyboard layouts, these characters are accessible only through a set of keystrokes (see Unicode input).

== Ordinal dot ==
A Basque publication for the 33rd (XXXIII.) Basque Theater Meetings.

In Basque, Serbo-Croatian, Czech, Danish, Estonian, Faroese, Finnish, German, Hungarian, Icelandic, Latvian, Norwegian, Slovak, Slovene, Turkish, among other languages, a period or full stop is written after the numeral. In Polish, the period can be omitted if there is no ambiguity whether a given numeral is ordinal or cardinal. The only exceptions are variables in mathematics (k+1-szy – (k+1)st). Writing out the endings for various cases, as sometimes happens in Czech and Slovak, is considered incorrect and uneducated. Should a full stop follow this dot, it is omitted.

The Serbian standard of Serbo-Croatian (unlike the Croatian and Bosnian standards) uses the dot in role of the ordinal indicator only past Arabic numerals, while Roman numerals are used without a dot.

There is a problem with autocorrection, mobile editors, etc., which often force a capital initial letter in the word following the ordinal numbers.

== Other suffixes ==
=== English ===
- -st is used with numbers ending in 1 (e.g. 1st, pronounced first)
- -nd is used with numbers ending in 2 (e.g. 92nd, pronounced ninety-second)
- -rd is used with numbers ending in 3 (e.g. 33rd, pronounced thirty-third)
- As an exception to the above rules, numbers ending with 11, 12, and 13 use -th (e.g. 11th, pronounced eleventh, 112th, pronounced one hundred [and] twelfth)
- -th is used for all other numbers (e.g. 9th, pronounced ninth).
- One archaic variant uses a singular -d for numbers ending in 2 or 3 (e.g. 92d or 33d)

In 19th-century handwriting, these terminals were often elevated, that is to say written as superscripts (e.g. 2^{nd}, 34^{th}). With the gradual introduction of the typewriter in the late 19th century, it became common to write them on the baseline in typewritten texts, and this usage even became recommended in certain 20th-century style guides. Thus, the 17th edition of The Chicago Manual of Style states: "The letters in ordinal numbers should not appear as superscripts (e.g., 122nd not 122^{nd})", as do the Bluebook and style guides by the Council of Science Editors, Microsoft, and Yahoo. Two problems are that superscripts are used "most often in citations" and are "tiny and hard to read". Some word processors format ordinal indicators as superscripts by default (e.g. Microsoft Word). Style guide author Jack Lynch (Rutgers) recommends turning off automatic superscripting of ordinals in Microsoft Word, because "no professionally printed books use superscripts".

=== French ===
French uses the ordinal indicators ^{er} and ^{re} for the number 1, depending on gender (masculine 1^{er} – premier; feminine 1^{re} – première). It uses ^{e} for higher numbers (for instance 2^{e} – deuxième). French also uses the indicators ^{d} and ^{de} for the alternative second ordinal number (masculine 2^{d} – second; feminine 2^{de} – seconde). (Note: The distinction is not always followed, this alternative has a different meaning: 2^{e} – deuxième means the second item in a list which has more than two items (e.g., the second quarter of the century, le 2^{e} quart du siècle; the Second Punic War, la deuxième guerre punique) while 2^{d(e)} – second(e) means the second item in a list which (to date) has only two items (e.g., the second half of the century, la 2^{de} moitié du siècle; the Second French Empire, le Second Empire). In plural, all these indicators are suffixed with an s: ^{ers} (1^{ers} – premiers), ^{res} (1^{res} – premières), ^{es} (2^{es} – deuxièmes), ^{ds} (2^{ds} – seconds), ^{des} (2^{des} – secondes).)

Although regarded as incorrect by typographic standards, longer forms are in wide usage: ^{ère} for feminine 1 (1^{ère} – première)), ^{ème} for numbers starting at 2 (for instance 2^{ème} – deuxième), ^{nd} and ^{nde} for the alternative second ordinal number (2^{nd} – second; 2^{nde} – seconde)

These indicators use superscript formatting whenever it is available.

=== Catalan ===
The rule in Catalan is to follow the number with the last letter in the singular and the last two letters in the plural. Most numbers follow the pattern exemplified by vint '20' (20è m sg, 20a f sg, 20ns m pl, 20es f pl), but the first few ordinals are irregular, affecting the abbreviations of the masculine forms. Superscripting is not standard.

=== Dutch ===
Unlike other Germanic languages, Dutch is similar to English in this respect: the French layout with ^{e} used to be popular, but the recent spelling changes now prescribe the suffix ‑e. Optionally ‑ste and ‑de may be used, but this is more complex: 1ste (eerste), 2de (tweede), 4de (vierde), 20ste (twintigste), etc.

=== Finnish ===
In Finnish orthography, when the numeral is followed by its head noun (which indicates the grammatical case of the ordinal), it is sufficient to write a period or full stop after the numeral: Päädyin kilpailussa 2. sijalle "In the competition, I finished in 2nd place". However, if the head noun is omitted, the ordinal indicator takes the form of a morphological suffix, which is attached to the numeral with a colon. In the nominative case, the suffix is ‑nen for 1 and 2, and ‑s for larger numerals: Minä olin 2:nen, ja veljeni oli 3:s 'I came 2nd, and my brother came 3rd'. This is derived from the endings of the spelled-out ordinal numbers: ensimmäinen, toinen, kolmas, neljäs, viides, kuudes, seitsemäs, etc..

The system becomes rather complicated when the ordinal needs to be inflected, as the ordinal suffix is adjusted according to the case ending: 3:s (nominative case, which has no ending), 3:nnen (genitive case with ending ‑n), 3:tta (partitive case with ending ‑ta), 3:nnessa (inessive case with ending ‑ssa), 3:nteen (illative case with ending ‑en), etc.. Even native speakers sometimes find it difficult to exactly identify the ordinal suffix, as its borders with the word stem and the case ending may appear blurred. In such cases, it may be preferable to write the ordinal word entirely with letters and particularly 2:nen is rare even in the nominative case, as it is not significantly shorter than the full word toinen.

=== Irish ===
Numerals from 3 up form their ordinals uniformly by adding the suffix -ú: 3ú, 4ú, 5ú, etc. When the ordinal is written out, the suffix adheres to the spelling restrictions imposed by the broad/slender difference in consonants and is written -iú after slender consonants; but when written as numbers, only the suffix itself (-ú) is written. In the case of 4 (ceathair), the final syllable is syncopated before the suffix, and in the case of 9 (naoi), 20 (fiche), and 1000 (míle), the final vowel is assimilated into the suffix.

Most multiples of ten end in a vowel in their cardinal form and form their ordinal form by adding the suffix to their genitive singular form, which ends in -d; this is not reflected in writing. Exceptions are 20 (fiche) and 40 (daichead), both of which form their ordinals by adding the suffix directly to the cardinal (fichiú and daicheadú).

When counting objects, dó (2) becomes dhá and ceathair (4) becomes ceithre.

As in French, the vigesimal system is widely used, particularly in people's ages. Ceithre scór agus cúigdéag – 95.

The numbers 1 (aon) and 2 (dó) both have two separate ordinals: one regularly formed by adding -ú (aonú, dóú), and one suppletive form (céad, dara). The regular forms are restricted in their usage to actual numeric contexts, when counting. The latter are also used in counting, especially céad, but are used in broader, more abstract senses of "first" and "second" (or "other"). In their broader senses, céad and dara are not written as 1ú and 2ú, though 1ú and 2ú may in a numeric context be read aloud as céad and dara (e.g., an 21ú lá may be read as an t-aonú lá is fiche or as an chéad lá is fiche).

	Cardinal	Ordinal
1	a h-aon	aonú (1ú) or céad
2	a dó	dóú (2ú) or dara
3	a trí	tríú (3ú)
4	a ceathair	ceathrú (4ú)
5	a cúig	cúigiú (5ú)
6	a sé	séú (6ú)
7	a seacht	seachtú (7ú)
8	a hocht	ochtú (8ú)
9	a naoi	naoú (9ú)
10	a deich	deichiú (10ú)
20	fiche or scór	fichiú (20ú)
30	triocha	triochadú (30ú)
40	daichead, ceathracha or dhá scór	daicheadú or ceathrachadú (40ú)
50	caoga	caogadú (50ú)
60	seasca or trí scór	seascadú (60ú)
70	seachtó	seachtódú (70ú)
80	ochtó or ceithre scór	ochtódú (80ú)
90	nócha	nóchadú (90ú)
100	céad	céadú (100ú)
1000	míle	míliú (1000ú)

=== Russian ===
One or two letters of the spelled-out numeral are appended to it (either after a hyphen or, rarely, in superscript). The rule is to take the minimal number of letters that include at least one consonant phoneme. Examples: 2-му второму /ftɐromu/, 2-я вторая /ftɐraja/, 2-й второй /ftɐroj/ (note that in the second example, the vowel letter я represents two phonemes, one of which [/j/] is consonant).

=== Swedish ===
The general rule is that :a (for 1 and 2) or :e (for all other numbers, except 101:a, 42:a, etc., but including 11:e and 12:e) is appended to the numeral. The reason is that -a and -e respectively end the ordinal number words. The ordinals for 1 and 2 may however be given an -e form (förste and andre instead of första and andra) when used about a male person (masculine natural gender), and if so they are written 1:e and 2:e. When indicating dates, suffixes are never used. Examples: 1:a klass "first grade (in elementary school)", 3:e utgåvan "third edition", but 6 november. Furthermore, suffixes can be left out if the number obviously is an ordinal number, example: 3 utg. "3rd ed". Using a full stop as an ordinal indicator is considered archaic, but still occurs in military contexts; for example: 5. komp "5th company".

== Prefix ==
Numbers in Malay and Indonesian are preceded by the ordinal prefix ke-; for example, ke-7 "seventh". The exception is pertama, which means "first".

Numbers in Filipino are preceded by the ordinal prefix ika- or pang- (the latter subject to sandhi; for example, ika-7 or pam-7 "seventh"). The exception is una, which means "first".

In Chinese and Japanese, an ordinal number is formed when a numeral is preceded by the character 第 (pronounced dì in Mandarin Chinese, dai in Japanese): for example, 第一 "first", 第二 "second". This is a typical character, not a special ordinal indicator, and unlike in European languages, it is also not an abbreviation.

In Korean, an ordinal number is prefixed by 제 je or suffixed by 번째 beonjjae: for example, 제1 "first", 2번째 "second".

== Uses not related to numbers ==
In Spanish, superior letters (letras voladas, 'flying letters') are commonly used to shorten some words, such as adm.^{ora} for administradora ('administrator'), imp.^{to} for impuesto ('tax'), V.º B.º for visto bueno ('approved'), D.ª for doña (an honorific), and M.ª for María (a Spanish name frequently used in compounds like José M.ª). When a lone o or a is the raised letter, the masculine or feminine ordinal indicator may be used for this purpose, which may or may not be considered correct.

Portuguese also forms some abbreviations in the same manner, such as Ex.^{mo} for Excelentíssimo (an honorific), L.^{da} for Limitada ('Ltd.'), and Sr.ª for Senhora ('Ms.').

In both Spanish and Portuguese, abbreviations formed this way have a period between the last regular letter and the first raised letter. Traditionally, the raised letters are underlined, but this is optional and less frequent today.

In English:

- Abbreviations such as "answ^{d}" for "answered" and "Jo^{s}" for "Joseph" were commonly used in English-language handwritten letters and records prior to the 20th century.
- English has borrowed the No. abbreviation from the Romance-language word numero, which itself derives from the Latin word numero, the ablative case of the word numerus "number". This is sometimes written as N^{o}, with the superscript o optionally underlined, or sometimes with the ordinal indicator. In this case the ordinal indicator would simply represent the letter o in numero; see numero sign.

== See also ==
- Numero sign
- Superior letter
