= / (disambiguation) =

/ or "slash" is a slanting line punctuation mark.

/ may also refer to:

- A division (mathematics) sign, separating the numerator and denominator of a fraction (e.g. 3 / 4)

== Creative works ==
- / (Person of Interest), a TV episode (S3E17 = #62)
- / (book), also titled Slant, a novel by Greg Bear

== Computing ==
- In a path (computing), the root directory and the directory separator, on Unix-like systems and some others, as well as in a Uniform Resource Identifier (URI) and elsewhere
- The standard prefix for a switch/flag in Microsoft operating systems — see Command-line interface § Option conventions in DOS, Windows, OS/2
- The separator between the IP address and netmask size in CIDR notation
- The prefix and suffix for a regular expression, in ed-style syntax
- The standard prefix for an Internet Relay Chat (IRC) command
  - For "/me" or similar, see emote
- The distinguishing feature of an end tag (</tag name>) in XML

== Other uses ==
- A division (mathematics) sign, separating the numerator and denominator of a fraction (e.g. 3 / 4)
- The prefix and suffix for a phoneme or a sequence of them
- The prefix for a tone indicator
- The prefix and suffix for an imageboard on 4chan

== See also ==
- Slash (disambiguation)
- Stroke (diacritic) (e.g. ◌̷ , ◌̸)
- Backslash (\)
- Vertical bar (disambiguation)
- // (disambiguation)
- /\ (disambiguation)
- \/ (disambiguation)
- /\/\ /\ Y /\ or ΛΛ Λ Y Λ, stylization of Maya, 2010 album by M.I.A.
- /@/, stylization of Left at London, stage name of Nat Puff
- Emoticon § Western
- /= (disambiguation)
- /., abbreviation for Slashdot, a nerd-focused social news website
- %/%, an environment variable in DOS
- /a/ (disambiguation)
- /b/ (disambiguation)
- /e/ (operating system), a privacy-focused fork of LineageOS, derived from Android
- /Film, AKA SlashFilm, a blog about movies
- /Passenger., the band that created the 2007 album Wicked Man's Rest
- /r/ (disambiguation)
- /rif, AKA Rif or Rhythm in Freedom, an Indonesian alternative rock band
- /ritzau/, the logo of Ritzaus Bureau A/S, a Danish news agency
- /s/ (disambiguation)
- </SCORPION>, the logo of Scorpion, 2014–2018 American action drama television series
- W:/2016Album/, by Deadmau5
- /X, AKA AmiExpress, a BBS software application created by Synthetic Technologies
