= Poe's law =

Confusion of parody and sincere expression

Poe's law is an adage of Internet culture which says that, without a clear indicator of the author's intent, any parodic or sarcastic expression of extreme views can be mistaken by some readers for a sincere expression of those views.

== Origin ==
Poe's law originated in a 2005 discussion on christianforums.com, an Internet forum on Christianity. The message was posted during a debate on creationism, where a previous poster had remarked to another user: "Good thing you included the winky. Otherwise people might think you are serious."

In a reply, forum member Nathan Poe suggested "Poe's Law":

Without a winking smiley or other blatant display of humor, it is utterly impossible to parody a Creationist in such a way that someone won't mistake for the genuine article.

In part, Poe was simply reiterating common advice about the need to clearly mark online sarcasm or parody, otherwise it would be interpreted as the real thing or used by online trolls, extremists, and fundamentalists as sincere expressions of their authors, particularly if they match their own views. Some would publish extremism or defamation without a smiley or other indication of satire, and if there was too much criticism towards it, reply that it was intended ironically. As early as 1983, Jerry Schwarz, in a post on Usenet, wrote:

Avoid sarcasm and facetious remarks.

Without the voice inflection and body language of personal communication these are easily misinterpreted. A sideways smile, :-), has become widely accepted on the net as an indication that "I'm only kidding". If you submit a satiric item without this symbol, no matter how obvious the satire is to you, do not be surprised if people take it seriously.

== Usage ==
The original statement of Poe's law referred specifically to creationism, but it has since been generalized to apply to any kind of fundamentalism or extremism.

In 2017, Wired published an article calling Poe's Law "2017's Most Important Internet Phenomenon", and wrote that it "applies to more and more internet interactions". The article gave examples of cases such as on 4chan forums with the usage of the OK gesture as a white power symbol and the Trump administration where there were deliberate ambiguities over whether something was serious or intended as a parody, where people were using Poe's law as "a refuge" to camouflage beliefs that would otherwise be considered unacceptable. Some treat Poe's law as part of contemporary kitsch culture; another view maintains that Poe's law could lead to nihilism, a situation where nothing matters and everything is a joke.

In 2025, philosopher Jack Russell Weinstein offered two variations on Poe's Law, which he does not name. The first one is "given enough emotional commitment, it becomes impossible to distinguish between advocacy and trolling." The second is "...when faced with true emotional exhaustion, apathy and resignation are impossible to tell apart."

== See also ==
- Clarke's third law
- Godwin's law
- Irony poisoning
- Irony punctuation
- List of eponymous laws
- Post-irony
- Tone indicator
- Scare quotes
