= Punctuation =

Marks to indicate pacing of written text

Punctuation marks are marks indicating how a piece of written text should be read (silently or aloud) and, consequently, understood. The oldest known examples of punctuation marks were found in the Mesha Stele from the 9th century BC, consisting of points between the words and horizontal strokes between sections. The alphabet-based writing began with no spaces, no capitalization, no vowels (see abjad), and with only a few punctuation marks, as it was mostly aimed at recording business transactions. Only with the Greek playwrights (such as Euripides and Aristophanes) did the ends of sentences begin to be marked to help actors know when to make a pause during performances. Punctuation includes space between words and both obsolete and modern signs.

By the 19th century, grammarians explained the difference between the punctuation marks by means of a hierarchy that ascribed different weight to them. Six marks, proposed in 1966 by the French author Hervé Bazin, could be seen as predecessors of emoticons and emojis.

Sometimes, the meaning of a text can be changed substantially by using different punctuation, such as in "woman, without her man, is nothing" (emphasizing the importance of men to women), contrasted with "woman: without her, man is nothing" (emphasizing the importance of women to men). Similar changes in meaning can be achieved in spoken forms of most languages by using elements of speech such as suprasegmentals. The rules of punctuation vary with the language, location, register, and time. In online chat and text messages, punctuation is used tachygraphically, especially among younger users.

== History ==
=== Western antiquity ===
During antiquity, most scribes in the West wrote in scriptio continua, i.e., without punctuation delimiting word boundaries. Around the 5th century BC, the Greeks began using punctuation consisting of vertically arranged dots—usually a dicolon or tricolon—as an aid in the oral delivery of texts. After 200 BC, Greek scribes adopted the théseis system invented by Aristophanes of Byzantium, where a single dot called a punctus was placed at one of several heights to denote rhetorical divisions in speech:

- hypostigmḗ – a low punctus on the baseline to mark off a komma (a unit smaller than a clause)
- stigmḕ mésē – a punctus at midheight to mark off a clause (kōlon)
- stigmḕ teleía – a high punctus to mark off a sentence (periodos)

In addition, the Greeks used the paragraphos (or gamma) to mark the beginning of sentences, marginal diples to mark quotations, and a koronis to indicate the end of major sections.

During the 1st century BC, Romans also made occasional use of symbols to indicate pauses, but by the 4th century AD the Greek théseis—called distinctiones in Latin (Note: The Latin names for the marks are subdistinctio, media distinctio, and distinctio.)—prevailed, as reported by Aelius Donatus and Isidore of Seville (7th century). Latin texts were sometimes laid out per capitula, where each sentence was placed on its own line. Diples were used, but by the late period, these often degenerated into comma-shaped marks.

=== Medieval ===
Punctuation developed dramatically when large numbers of copies of the Bible started to be produced. These were designed to be read aloud, so the copyists began to introduce a range of marks to aid the reader, including indentation, various punctuation marks (diple, paragraphos, simplex ductus), and an early version of initial capitals (litterae notabiliores). Jerome and his colleagues, who translated the Bible into Latin, the Vulgate (c. AD 400), employed a layout system based on established practices for teaching the speeches of Demosthenes and Cicero. Under his layout per cola et commata every sense-unit was indented and given its own line. This layout was solely used for biblical manuscripts during the 5th–9th centuries, but was abandoned in favor of punctuation.

In the 7th–8th centuries Irish and Anglo-Saxon scribes, whose native languages were not derived from Latin, added more visual cues to render texts more intelligible. Irish scribes introduced the practice of word separation. Likewise, insular scribes adopted the distinctiones system while adapting it for minuscule script (so as to be more prominent) by using not differing height but rather a differing number of marks – aligned horizontally (or sometimes triangularly) – to signify a pause's duration: one mark for a minor pause, two for a medium one, and three for a major one. Most common were the punctus, a comma-shaped mark, and the comma positura, a 7-shaped mark (⁊, usually called the "Tironian et", equivalent to a modern ampersand), often used in combination. The same marks could be used in the margin to mark off quotations.

In the late 8th century, a different system emerged in France under the Carolingian dynasty. Originally indicating how the voice should be modulated when chanting the liturgy, the positurae migrated into any text meant to be read aloud, and then to all manuscripts. Positurae first reached England in the late 10th century, probably during the Benedictine reform movement, but was not adopted until after the Norman conquest. The original positurae were the punctus, marking a minor pause within the sentence, punctus elevatus, marking a major pause within the sentence, punctus versus, marking the end of a declarative sentence, and punctus interrogativus, marking the end of an interrogative sentence. A fifth symbol, the punctus flexus was added in the 10th century to indicate a pause of a value between the punctus and punctus elevatus. In the late 11th/early 12th century, the punctus versus disappeared and was taken over by the simple punctus (now with two distinct values).

The late Middle Ages saw the addition of the virgula suspensiva (slash or slash with a midpoint dot), which was often used in conjunction with the punctus for different types of pauses. Direct quotations were marked with marginal diples, as in Antiquity, but from at least the 12th century, scribes also began entering diples (sometimes double) within the column of text.

=== Medieval China ===
Punctuation marks, especially spacing, were not needed in logographic or syllabic (such as Chinese and Mayan script) texts because disambiguation and emphasis could be communicated by employing a separate written form distinct from the spoken form of the language. Ancient Chinese classical texts were transmitted without punctuation. However, many Warring States period bamboo texts contain the symbols ⟨└⟩ and ⟨▄⟩ indicating the end of a chapter and full stop, respectively. By the Song dynasty, the addition of punctuation to texts by scholars to aid comprehension became common.

=== Printing-press era ===
The amount of printed material and its readership began to increase after the invention of moveable type in Europe in the 1450s. Martin Luther's German Bible translation was one of the first mass-printed works; he used only virgule, full stop, and less than one percent question marks as punctuation. The focus of punctuation still was rhetorical, to aid reading aloud. As explained by writer and editor Lynne Truss, "The rise of printing in the 14th and 15th centuries meant that a standard system of punctuation was urgently required." Printed books, whose letters were uniform, could be read much more rapidly than manuscripts. Rapid reading, or reading aloud, did not allow time to analyze sentence structures. This increased speed led to the greater use and finally standardization of punctuation, which showed the relationships of words with each other: where one sentence ends and another begins, for example.

The introduction of a standard system of punctuation has also been attributed to the Venetian printers Aldus Manutius and his grandson. They have been credited with popularizing the practice of ending sentences with the colon or full stop (period), inventing the semicolon, making occasional use of parentheses, and creating the modern comma by lowering the virgule. By 1566, Aldus Manutius the Younger was able to state that the main object of punctuation was the clarification of syntax.

By the 19th century, punctuation in the Western world had evolved "to classify the marks hierarchically, in terms of weight". Cecil Hartley's poem identifies their relative values:

The stop point out, with truth, the time of pause
A sentence doth require at ev'ry clause.
At ev'ry comma, stop while one you count;
At semicolon, two is the amount;
A colon doth require the time of three;
The period four, as learned men agree.

The use of punctuation was not standardised until after the invention of printing. According to the 1885 edition of The American Printer, the importance of punctuation was noted in various sayings by children, such as:

Charles the First walked and talked
Half an hour after his head was cut off.

With a semicolon and a comma added, it reads as follows:

Charles the First walked and talked;
Half an hour after, his head was cut off.

In a 19th-century manual of typography, Thomas MacKellar writes:

Shortly after the invention of printing, the necessity of stops or pauses in sentences for the guidance of the reader produced the colon and full point. In the process of time, the comma was added, which was then merely a perpendicular line, proportioned to the body of the letter. These three points were the only ones used until the close of the fifteenth century, when Aldo Manuccio gave a better shape to the comma, and added the semicolon; the comma denoting the shortest pause, the semicolon next, then the colon, and the full point terminating the sentence. The marks of interrogation and admiration were introduced many years later.

=== Typewriters and electronic communication ===
The introduction of electrical telegraphy with a limited set of transmission codes and typewriters with a limited set of keys influenced punctuation subtly. For example, curved quotes and apostrophes were all collapsed into two characters (' and "). The hyphen, minus sign, and dashes of various widths have been collapsed into a single character (-), sometimes repeated to represent a long dash. The spaces of different widths available to professional typesetters were generally replaced by a single full-character-width space, with typefaces monospaced. In some cases, a typewriter keyboard did not include an exclamation point (!), which could otherwise be constructed by the overstrike of an apostrophe and a period; the original Morse code did not have an exclamation point.

These simplifications have been carried forward into digital writing, with teleprinters and the ASCII character set essentially supporting the same characters as typewriters. Treatment of whitespace in HTML discouraged the practice (in English prose) of putting two full spaces after a full stop, since a single or double space would appear the same on the screen. (Most style guides now discourage double spaces, and some electronic writing tools, including Wikipedia's software, automatically collapse double spaces to single.) The full traditional set of typesetting tools became available with the advent of desktop publishing and more sophisticated word processors. Despite the widespread adoption of character sets like Unicode that support the punctuation of traditional typesetting, writing forms like text messages tend to use the simplified ASCII style of punctuation, with the addition of new non-text characters like emoji. Informal text speak tends to drop punctuation when not needed, including some ways that would be considered errors in more formal writing.

In the computer era, punctuation characters were recycled for use in programming languages and URLs. Due to its use in email and Twitter handles, the at sign (@) has gone from an obscure character mostly used by sellers of bulk commodities (10 pounds @$2.00 per pound), to a very common character in common use for both technical routing and an abbreviation for "at". The tilde (~), in moveable type only used in combination with vowels, for mechanical reasons ended up as a separate key on mechanical typewriters, and like @ it has been put to completely new uses.

== In English ==
There are two major styles of punctuation in English: British or American. These two styles differ mainly in the way in which they handle quotation marks, particularly in conjunction with other punctuation marks. In British English, punctuation marks such as full stops and commas are placed inside the quotation mark only if they are part of what is being quoted, and placed outside the closing quotation mark if part of the containing sentence. In American English, however, such punctuation is generally placed inside the closing quotation mark regardless. This rule varies for other punctuation marks; for example, American English follows the British English rule when it comes to semicolons, colons, question marks, and exclamation points. The serial comma is used much more often in the United States than in the UK.

== Other languages ==
Other languages of Europe use much the same punctuation as English. The similarity is so strong that the few variations may confuse a native English reader. Quotation marks are particularly variable across European languages. For example, in French and Russian, quotes would appear as: « Je suis fatigué. » (In French, the quotation marks are spaced from the enclosed material; in Russian, they are not.)

In the French of France and Belgium, the marks ⟨:⟩, ⟨;⟩, ⟨?⟩ and ⟨!⟩ are preceded by a thin space. In Canadian French, this is only the case for ⟨:⟩.

In Greek, the question mark is written as the English semicolon, while the functions of the colon and semicolon are performed by a raised point ⟨·⟩, known as the ano teleia (άνω τελεία).

In Georgian, three dots ⟨჻⟩ were formerly used as a sentence or paragraph divider. It is still sometimes used in calligraphy.

Spanish and Asturian (both of them Romance languages used in Spain) use an inverted question mark ⟨¿⟩ at the beginning of a question and the normal question mark at the end, as well as an inverted exclamation mark ⟨¡⟩ at the beginning of an exclamation and the normal exclamation mark at the end.

Armenian uses several punctuation marks of its own. The full stop is represented by a colon, and vice versa; the exclamation mark is represented by a diagonal similar to a tilde ⟨~⟩, while the question mark ⟨՞⟩ resembles an unclosed circle placed after the last vowel of the word.

Arabic, Urdu, and Persian—written from right to left—use a reversed question mark: ⟨؟⟩, and a reversed comma: ⟨،⟩. This is a modern innovation; pre-modern Arabic did not use punctuation. Hebrew, which is also written from right to left, uses the same characters as in English: ⟨,⟩ and ⟨?⟩.

Originally, Sanskrit had no punctuation. In the 17th century, Sanskrit and Marathi, both written using Devanagari, started using the daṇḍa ⟨।⟩ to end a line of prose and double daṇḍa ⟨॥⟩ to end some larger organizational units of text.

Punctuation was not used in Chinese, Japanese, Korean, and Vietnamese chữ Nôm writing until the adoption of punctuation from the West in the late 19th and early 20th century. In unpunctuated texts, the grammatical structure of sentences in classical writing is inferred from context. Most punctuation marks in modern Chinese, Japanese, and Korean have similar functions to their English counterparts; however, they often look different and have different customary rules.

In the Indian subcontinent, ⟨:-⟩ is sometimes used in place of a colon or after a subheading. Its origin is unclear, but it could be a remnant of the British Raj. Another punctuation practice common in the Indian Subcontinent for writing monetary amounts is the use of ⟨/-⟩ or ⟨/=⟩ after the number. For example, Rs. 20/- or Rs. 20/= implies 20 whole rupees.

Thai, Khmer, Lao, and Burmese did not use punctuation until the adoption of punctuation from the West in the 20th century. Blank spaces are more frequent than full stops or commas.

== Novel punctuation marks ==
=== Percontation point ===
The percontation point (U+2E2E ⸮ REVERSED QUESTION MARK), a horizontally-mirrored question mark, was used occasionally in the 16th and 17th centuries to mark rhetorical questions.

=== Interrobang ===
In 1962, American advertising executive Martin K. Speckter proposed the interrobang (U+203D ‽ INTERROBANG), a combination of the question mark and exclamation point, to mark rhetorical questions or questions stated in a tone of disbelief. Although the new punctuation mark was widely discussed in the 1960s, it failed to achieve widespread use. Nevertheless, both it and its inverted form were given code points in Unicode: U+203D ‽ INTERROBANG, U+2E18 ⸘ INVERTED INTERROBANG.

=== Predecessors of emoticons and emojis ===
The six additional punctuation marks proposed in 1966 by the French author Hervé Bazin in his book Plumons l'Oiseau ("Let's pluck the bird", 1966) could be seen as predecessors of tone indicators.

These were:

- the "irony point" or "irony mark" (point d'ironie:)
- the "love point" (point d'amour:)
  A point d'amour mark, or "love point"
- the "conviction point" (point de conviction:)
- the "authority point" (point d'autorité:)
- the "acclamation point" (point d'acclamation:)
- the "doubt point" (point de doute:)

=== "Question comma", "exclamation comma" ===
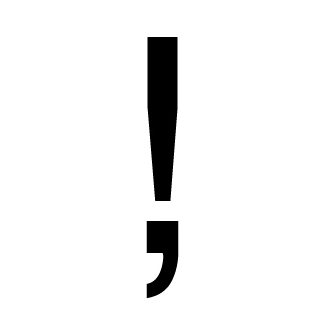
An exclamation comma

An international patent application was filed and published in 1992 under World Intellectual Property Organization (WIPO) number WO9219458, for two new punctuation marks: the "question comma" and the "exclamation comma". The question comma has a comma instead of the dot at the bottom of a question mark, while the exclamation comma has a comma in place of the point at the bottom of an exclamation mark. These were intended for use as question and exclamation marks within a sentence, a function for which normal question and exclamation marks can also be used, but which may be considered obsolescent. The patent application entered the national phase only in Canada. It was advertised as lapsing in Australia on 27 January 1994 and in Canada on 6 November 1995.

=== Others ===
Other proposed punctuation marks include:

- Snark mark, indicating an ironic statement by putting a tilde next to terminal punctuation: .~ for dry sarcasm, !~ for enthusiastic sarcasm, and ?~ for sarcastic questions
- SarcMark for sarcasm

== Punctuation marks in Unicode ==
=== Pd, dash ===
Pd, dash
Mark	Name	Code point	General Category	Script
-	HYPHEN-MINUS	U+002D	Pd, dash	Common
‐	HYPHEN	U+2010	Pd, dash	Common
‑	NON-BREAKING HYPHEN	U+2011	Pd, dash	Common
‒	FIGURE DASH	U+2012	Pd, dash	Common
–	EN DASH	U+2013	Pd, dash	Common
—	EM DASH	U+2014	Pd, dash	Common
―	HORIZONTAL BAR	U+2015	Pd, dash	Common
⸗	DOUBLE OBLIQUE HYPHEN	U+2E17	Pd, dash	Common
⸚	HYPHEN WITH DIAERESIS	U+2E1A	Pd, dash	Common
⸺	TWO-EM DASH	U+2E3A	Pd, dash	Common
⸻	THREE-EM DASH	U+2E3B	Pd, dash	Common
⹀	DOUBLE HYPHEN	U+2E40	Pd, dash	Common
〜	WAVE DASH	U+301C	Pd, dash	Common
〰	WAVY DASH	U+3030	Pd, dash	Common
゠	KATAKANA-HIRAGANA DOUBLE HYPHEN	U+30A0	Pd, dash	Common
︱	PRESENTATION FORM FOR VERTICAL EM DASH	U+FE31	Pd, dash	Common
︲	PRESENTATION FORM FOR VERTICAL EN DASH	U+FE32	Pd, dash	Common
﹘	SMALL EM DASH	U+FE58	Pd, dash	Common
﹣	SMALL HYPHEN-MINUS	U+FE63	Pd, dash	Common
－	FULLWIDTH HYPHEN-MINUS	U+FF0D	Pd, dash	Common
֊	ARMENIAN HYPHEN	U+058A	Pd, dash	Armenian
᐀	CANADIAN SYLLABICS HYPHEN	U+1400	Pd, dash	Canadian Aboriginal
־	HEBREW PUNCTUATION MAQAF	U+05BE	Pd, dash	Hebrew
᠆	MONGOLIAN TODO SOFT HYPHEN	U+1806	Pd, dash	Mongolian
𐺭	YEZIDI HYPHENATION MARK	U+10EAD	Pd, dash	Yezidi

=== Pi-Pf, initial–final quote ===
Pi-Pf, initial–final quote
Mark	Name	Code point	General Category	Script
« »	LEFT-POINTING DOUBLE ANGLE QUOTATION MARK; RIGHT-POINTING DOUBLE ANGLE QUOTATION MARK	U+00AB; U+00BB	Pi, initial; Pf, final	Common
‘ ’	LEFT SINGLE QUOTATION MARK; RIGHT SINGLE QUOTATION MARK	U+2018; U+2019	Pi, initial; Pf, final	Common
‛	SINGLE HIGH-REVERSED-9 QUOTATION MARK	U+201B	Pi, initial quote	Common
“ ”	LEFT DOUBLE QUOTATION MARK; RIGHT DOUBLE QUOTATION MARK	U+201C; U+201D	Pi, initial; Pf, final	Common
‟	DOUBLE HIGH-REVERSED-9 QUOTATION MARK	U+201F	Pi, initial quote	Common
‹ ›	SINGLE LEFT-POINTING ANGLE QUOTATION MARK; SINGLE RIGHT-POINTING ANGLE QUOTATION MARK	U+2039; U+203A	Pi, initial; Pf, final	Common
⸂ ⸃	LEFT SUBSTITUTION BRACKET; RIGHT SUBSTITUTION BRACKET	U+2E02; U+2E03	Pi, initial; Pf, final	Common
⸄ ⸅	LEFT DOTTED SUBSTITUTION BRACKET; RIGHT DOTTED SUBSTITUTION BRACKET	U+2E04; U+2E05	Pi, initial; Pf, final	Common
⸉ ⸊	LEFT TRANSPOSITION BRACKET; RIGHT TRANSPOSITION BRACKET	U+2E09; U+2E0A	Pi, initial; Pf, final	Common
⸌ ⸍	LEFT RAISED OMISSION BRACKET; RIGHT RAISED OMISSION BRACKET	U+2E0C; U+2E0D	Pi, initial; Pf, final	Common
⸜ ⸝	LEFT LOW PARAPHRASE BRACKET; RIGHT LOW PARAPHRASE BRACKET	U+2E1C; U+2E1D	Pi, initial; Pf, final	Common
⸠ ⸡	LEFT VERTICAL BAR WITH QUILL; RIGHT VERTICAL BAR WITH QUILL	U+2E20; U+2E21	Pi, initial; Pf, final	Common

=== Ps-Pe, open–close (brackets) ===
Ps-Pe, open–close (brackets)
Mark	Name	Code point	General Category	Script
( )	LEFT PARENTHESIS; RIGHT PARENTHESIS	U+0028; U+0029	Ps, open; Pe, close	Common
[ ]	LEFT SQUARE BRACKET; RIGHT SQUARE BRACKET	U+005B; U+005D	Ps, open; Pe, close	Common
{ }	LEFT CURLY BRACKET; RIGHT CURLY BRACKET	U+007B; U+007D	Ps, open; Pe, close	Common
‚	SINGLE LOW-9 QUOTATION MARK	U+201A	Ps, open	Common
„	DOUBLE LOW-9 QUOTATION MARK	U+201E	Ps, open	Common
⁅ ⁆	LEFT SQUARE BRACKET WITH QUILL; RIGHT SQUARE BRACKET WITH QUILL	U+2045; U+2046	Ps, open; Pe, close	Common
⁽ ⁾	SUPERSCRIPT LEFT PARENTHESIS; SUPERSCRIPT RIGHT PARENTHESIS	U+207D; U+207E	Ps, open; Pe, close	Common
₍ ₎	SUBSCRIPT LEFT PARENTHESIS; SUBSCRIPT RIGHT PARENTHESIS	U+208D; U+208E	Ps, open; Pe, close	Common
⌈ ⌉	LEFT CEILING; RIGHT CEILING	U+2308; U+2309	Ps, open; Pe, close	Common
⌊ ⌋	LEFT FLOOR; RIGHT FLOOR	U+230A; U+230B	Ps, open; Pe, close	Common
〈 〉	LEFT-POINTING ANGLE BRACKET; RIGHT-POINTING ANGLE BRACKET	U+2329; U+232A	Ps, open; Pe, close	Common
❨ ❩	MEDIUM LEFT PARENTHESIS ORNAMENT; MEDIUM RIGHT PARENTHESIS ORNAMENT	U+2768; U+2769	Ps, open; Pe, close	Common
❪ ❫	MEDIUM FLATTENED LEFT PARENTHESIS ORNAMENT; MEDIUM FLATTENED RIGHT PARENTHESIS ORNAMENT	U+276A; U+276B	Ps, open; Pe, close	Common
❬ ❭	MEDIUM LEFT-POINTING ANGLE BRACKET ORNAMENT; MEDIUM RIGHT-POINTING ANGLE BRACKET ORNAMENT	U+276C; U+276D	Ps, open; Pe, close	Common
❮ ❯	HEAVY LEFT-POINTING ANGLE QUOTATION MARK ORNAMENT; HEAVY RIGHT-POINTING ANGLE QUOTATION MARK ORNAMENT	U+276E; U+276F	Ps, open; Pe, close	Common
❰ ❱	HEAVY LEFT-POINTING ANGLE BRACKET ORNAMENT; HEAVY RIGHT-POINTING ANGLE BRACKET ORNAMENT	U+2770; U+2771	Ps, open; Pe, close	Common
❲ ❳	LIGHT LEFT TORTOISE SHELL BRACKET ORNAMENT; LIGHT RIGHT TORTOISE SHELL BRACKET ORNAMENT	U+2772; U+2773	Ps, open; Pe, close	Common
❴ ❵	MEDIUM LEFT CURLY BRACKET ORNAMENT; MEDIUM RIGHT CURLY BRACKET ORNAMENT	U+2774; U+2775	Ps, open; Pe, close	Common
⟅ ⟆	LEFT S-SHAPED BAG DELIMITER; RIGHT S-SHAPED BAG DELIMITER	U+27C5; U+27C6	Ps, open; Pe, close	Common
⟦ ⟧	MATHEMATICAL LEFT WHITE SQUARE BRACKET; MATHEMATICAL RIGHT WHITE SQUARE BRACKET	U+27E6; U+27E7	Ps, open; Pe, close	Common
⟨ ⟩	MATHEMATICAL LEFT ANGLE BRACKET; MATHEMATICAL RIGHT ANGLE BRACKET	U+27E8; U+27E9	Ps, open; Pe, close	Common
⟪ ⟫	MATHEMATICAL LEFT DOUBLE ANGLE BRACKET; MATHEMATICAL RIGHT DOUBLE ANGLE BRACKET	U+27EA; U+27EB	Ps, open; Pe, close	Common
⟬ ⟭	MATHEMATICAL LEFT WHITE TORTOISE SHELL BRACKET; MATHEMATICAL RIGHT WHITE TORTOISE SHELL BRACKET	U+27EC; U+27ED	Ps, open; Pe, close	Common
⟮ ⟯	MATHEMATICAL LEFT FLATTENED PARENTHESIS; MATHEMATICAL RIGHT FLATTENED PARENTHESIS	U+27EE; U+27EF	Ps, open; Pe, close	Common
⦃ ⦄	LEFT WHITE CURLY BRACKET; RIGHT WHITE CURLY BRACKET	U+2983; U+2984	Ps, open; Pe, close	Common
⦅ ⦆	LEFT WHITE PARENTHESIS; RIGHT WHITE PARENTHESIS	U+2985; U+2986	Ps, open; Pe, close	Common
⦇ ⦈	Z NOTATION LEFT IMAGE BRACKET; Z NOTATION RIGHT IMAGE BRACKET	U+2987; U+2988	Ps, open; Pe, close	Common
⦉ ⦊	Z NOTATION LEFT BINDING BRACKET; Z NOTATION RIGHT BINDING BRACKET	U+2989; U+298A	Ps, open; Pe, close	Common
⦋ ⦌	LEFT SQUARE BRACKET WITH UNDERBAR; RIGHT SQUARE BRACKET WITH UNDERBAR	U+298B; U+298C	Ps, open; Pe, close	Common
⦍ ⦎	LEFT SQUARE BRACKET WITH TICK IN TOP CORNER; RIGHT SQUARE BRACKET WITH TICK IN BOTTOM CORNER	U+298D; U+298E	Ps, open; Pe, close	Common
⦏ ⦐	LEFT SQUARE BRACKET WITH TICK IN BOTTOM CORNER; RIGHT SQUARE BRACKET WITH TICK IN TOP CORNER	U+298F; U+2990	Ps, open; Pe, close	Common
⦑ ⦒	LEFT ANGLE BRACKET WITH DOT; RIGHT ANGLE BRACKET WITH DOT	U+2991; U+2992	Ps, open; Pe, close	Common
⦓ ⦔	LEFT ARC LESS-THAN BRACKET; RIGHT ARC GREATER-THAN BRACKET	U+2993; U+2994	Ps, open; Pe, close	Common
⦕ ⦖	DOUBLE LEFT ARC GREATER-THAN BRACKET; DOUBLE RIGHT ARC LESS-THAN BRACKET	U+2995; U+2996	Ps, open; Pe, close	Common
⦗ ⦘	LEFT BLACK TORTOISE SHELL BRACKET; RIGHT BLACK TORTOISE SHELL BRACKET	U+2997; U+2998	Ps, open; Pe, close	Common
⧘ ⧙	LEFT WIGGLY FENCE; RIGHT WIGGLY FENCE	U+29D8; U+29D9	Ps, open; Pe, close	Common
⧚ ⧛	LEFT DOUBLE WIGGLY FENCE; RIGHT DOUBLE WIGGLY FENCE	U+29DA; U+29DB	Ps, open; Pe, close	Common
⧼ ⧽	LEFT-POINTING CURVED ANGLE BRACKET; RIGHT-POINTING CURVED ANGLE BRACKET	U+29FC; U+29FD	Ps, open; Pe, close	Common
⸢ ⸣	TOP LEFT HALF BRACKET; TOP RIGHT HALF BRACKET	U+2E22; U+2E23	Ps, open; Pe, close	Common
⸤ ⸥	BOTTOM LEFT HALF BRACKET; BOTTOM RIGHT HALF BRACKET	U+2E24; U+2E25	Ps, open; Pe, close	Common
⸦ ⸧	LEFT SIDEWAYS U BRACKET; RIGHT SIDEWAYS U BRACKET	U+2E26; U+2E27	Ps, open; Pe, close	Common
⸨ ⸩	LEFT DOUBLE PARENTHESIS; RIGHT DOUBLE PARENTHESIS	U+2E28; U+2E29	Ps, open; Pe, close	Common
⹕ ⹖	LEFT SQUARE BRACKET WITH STROKE; RIGHT SQUARE BRACKET WITH STROKE	U+2E55; U+2E56	Ps, open; Pe, close	Common
⹗ ⹘	LEFT SQUARE BRACKET WITH DOUBLE STROKE; RIGHT SQUARE BRACKET WITH DOUBLE STROKE	U+2E57; U+2E58	Ps, open; Pe, close	Common
⹢ ⹣	LEFT PARENTHESIS WITH MIDDLE RING; RIGHT PARENTHESIS WITH MIDDLE RING	U+2E62; U+2E63	Ps, open; Pe, close	Common
⹂	DOUBLE LOW-REVERSED-9 QUOTATION MARK	U+2E42	Ps, open	Common
〈 〉	LEFT ANGLE BRACKET; RIGHT ANGLE BRACKET	U+3008; U+3009	Ps, open; Pe, close	Common
《 》	LEFT DOUBLE ANGLE BRACKET; RIGHT DOUBLE ANGLE BRACKET	U+300A; U+300B	Ps, open; Pe, close	Common
「 」	LEFT CORNER BRACKET; RIGHT CORNER BRACKET	U+300C; U+300D	Ps, open; Pe, close	Common
『 』	LEFT WHITE CORNER BRACKET; RIGHT WHITE CORNER BRACKET	U+300E; U+300F	Ps, open; Pe, close	Common
【 】	LEFT BLACK LENTICULAR BRACKET; RIGHT BLACK LENTICULAR BRACKET	U+3010; U+3011	Ps, open; Pe, close	Common
〔 〕	LEFT TORTOISE SHELL BRACKET; RIGHT TORTOISE SHELL BRACKET	U+3014; U+3015	Ps, open; Pe, close	Common
〖 〗	LEFT WHITE LENTICULAR BRACKET; RIGHT WHITE LENTICULAR BRACKET	U+3016; U+3017	Ps, open; Pe, close	Common
〘 〙	LEFT WHITE TORTOISE SHELL BRACKET; RIGHT WHITE TORTOISE SHELL BRACKET	U+3018; U+3019	Ps, open; Pe, close	Common
〚 〛	LEFT WHITE SQUARE BRACKET; RIGHT WHITE SQUARE BRACKET	U+301A; U+301B	Ps, open; Pe, close	Common
〝 〞	REVERSED DOUBLE PRIME QUOTATION MARK; DOUBLE PRIME QUOTATION MARK	U+301D; U+301E	Ps, open; Pe, close	Common
〟	LOW DOUBLE PRIME QUOTATION MARK	U+301F	Pe, close	Common
﴾ ﴿	ORNATE LEFT PARENTHESIS; ORNATE RIGHT PARENTHESIS	U+FD3E; U+FD3F	Ps, open; Pe, close	Common
︗ ︘	PRESENTATION FORM FOR VERTICAL LEFT WHITE LENTICULAR BRACKET; PRESENTATION FORM FOR VERTICAL RIGHT WHITE LENTICULAR BRAKCET	U+FE17; U+FE18	Ps, open; Pe, close	Common
︵ ︶	PRESENTATION FORM FOR VERTICAL LEFT PARENTHESIS; PRESENTATION FORM FOR VERTICAL RIGHT PARENTHESIS	U+FE35; U+FE36	Ps, open; Pe, close	Common
︷ ︸	PRESENTATION FORM FOR VERTICAL LEFT CURLY BRACKET; PRESENTATION FORM FOR VERTICAL RIGHT CURLY BRACKET	U+FE37; U+FE38	Ps, open; Pe, close	Common
︹ ︺	PRESENTATION FORM FOR VERTICAL LEFT TORTOISE SHELL BRACKET; PRESENTATION FORM FOR VERTICAL RIGHT TORTOISE SHELL BRACKET	U+FE39; U+FE3A	Ps, open; Pe, close	Common
︻ ︼	PRESENTATION FORM FOR VERTICAL LEFT BLACK LENTICULAR BRACKET; PRESENTATION FORM FOR VERTICAL RIGHT BLACK LENTICULAR BRACKET	U+FE3B; U+FE3C	Ps, open; Pe, close	Common
︽ ︾	PRESENTATION FORM FOR VERTICAL LEFT DOUBLE ANGLE BRACKET; PRESENTATION FORM FOR VERTICAL RIGHT DOUBLE ANGLE BRACKET	U+FE3D; U+FE3E	Ps, open; Pe, close	Common
︿ ﹀	PRESENTATION FORM FOR VERTICAL LEFT ANGLE BRACKET; PRESENTATION FORM FOR VERTICAL RIGHT ANGLE BRACKET	U+FE3F; U+FE40	Ps, open; Pe, close	Common
﹁ ﹂	PRESENTATION FORM FOR VERTICAL LEFT CORNER BRACKET; PRESENTATION FORM FOR VERTICAL RIGHT CORNER BRACKET	U+FE41; U+FE42	Ps, open; Pe, close	Common
﹃ ﹄	PRESENTATION FORM FOR VERTICAL LEFT WHITE CORNER BRACKET; PRESENTATION FORM FOR VERTICAL RIGHT WHITE CORNER BRACKET	U+FE43; U+FE44	Ps, open; Pe, close	Common
﹇ ﹈	PRESENTATION FORM FOR VERTICAL LEFT SQUARE BRACKET; PRESENTATION FORM FOR VERTICAL RIGHT SQUARE BRACKET	U+FE47; U+FE48	Ps, open; Pe, close	Common
﹙ ﹚	SMALL LEFT PARENTHESIS; SMALL RIGHT PARENTHESIS	U+FE59; U+FE5A	Ps, open; Pe, close	Common
﹛ ﹜	SMALL LEFT CURLY BRACKET; SMALL RIGHT CURLY BRACKET	U+FE5B; U+FE5C	Ps, open; Pe, close	Common
﹝ ﹞	SMALL LEFT TORTOISE SHELL BRACKET; SMALL RIGHT TORTOISE SHELL BRACKET	U+FE5D; U+FE5E	Ps, open; Pe, close	Common
（ ）	FULLWIDTH LEFT PARENTHESIS; FULLWIDTH RIGHT PARENTHESIS	U+FF08; U+FF09	Ps, open; Pe, close	Common
［ ］	FULLWIDTH LEFT SQUARE BRACKET; FULLWIDTH RIGHT SQUARE BRACKET	U+FF3B; U+FF3D	Ps, open; Pe, close	Common
｛ ｝	FULLWIDTH LEFT CURLY BRACKET; FULLWIDTH RIGHT CURLY BRACKET	U+FF5B; U+FF5D	Ps, open; Pe, close	Common
｟ ｠	FULLWIDTH LEFT WHITE PARENTHESIS; FULLWIDTH RIGHT WHITE PARENTHESIS	U+FF5F; U+FF60	Ps, open; Pe, close	Common
｢ ｣	HALFWIDTH LEFT CORNER BRACKET; HALFWIDTH RIGHT CORNER BRACKET	U+FF62; U+FF63	Ps, open; Pe, close	Common
᚛ ᚜	OGHAM FEATHER MARK; OGHAM REVERSED FEATHER MARK	U+169B; U+169C	Ps, open; Pe, close	Ogham
༺ ༻	TIBETAN MARK GUG RTAGS GYON; TIBETAN MARK GUG RTAGS GYAS	U+0F3A; U+0F3B	Ps, open; Pe, close	Tibetan
༼ ༽	TIBETAN MARK ANG KHANG GYON; TIBETAN MARK ANG KHANG GYAS	U+0F3C; U+0F3D	Ps, open; Pe, close	Tibetan

=== Pc, connector ===
Pc, connector
Mark	Name	Code point	General Category	Script
_	LOW LINE	U+005F	Pc, connector	Common
‿	UNDERTIE	U+203F	Pc, connector	Common
⁀	CHARACTER TIE	U+2040	Pc, connector	Common
⁔	INVERTED UNDERTIE	U+2054	Pc, connector	Common
︳	PRESENTATION FORM FOR VERTICAL LOW LINE	U+FE33	Pc, connector	Common
︴	PRESENTATION FORM FOR VERTICAL WAVY LOW LINE	U+FE34	Pc, connector	Common
﹍	DASHED LOW LINE	U+FE4D	Pc, connector	Common
﹎	CENTRELINE LOW LINE	U+FE4E	Pc, connector	Common
﹏	WAVY LOW LINE	U+FE4F	Pc, connector	Common
＿	FULLWIDTH LOW LINE	U+FF3F	Pc, connector	Common

=== Po, other ===
Po, other
Mark	Name	Code point	General Category	Script
!	EXCLAMATION MARK	U+0021	Po, other	Common
"	QUOTATION MARK	U+0022	Po, other	Common
#	NUMBER SIGN	U+0023	Po, other	Common
%	PERCENT SIGN	U+0025	Po, other	Common
&	AMPERSAND	U+0026	Po, other	Common
'	APOSTROPHE	U+0027	Po, other	Common
*	ASTERISK	U+002A	Po, other	Common
,	COMMA	U+002C	Po, other	Common
.	FULL STOP	U+002E	Po, other	Common
/	SOLIDUS	U+002F	Po, other	Common
:	COLON	U+003A	Po, other	Common
;	SEMICOLON	U+003B	Po, other	Common
?	QUESTION MARK	U+003F	Po, other	Common
@	COMMERCIAL AT	U+0040	Po, other	Common
\	REVERSE SOLIDUS	U+005C	Po, other	Common
¡	INVERTED EXCLAMATION MARK	U+00A1	Po, other	Common
§	SECTION SIGN	U+00A7	Po, other	Common
¶	PILCROW SIGN	U+00B6	Po, other	Common
·	MIDDLE DOT	U+00B7	Po, other	Common
¿	INVERTED QUESTION MARK	U+00BF	Po, other	Common
;	GREEK QUESTION MARK	U+037E	Po, other	Common
·	GREEK ANO TELEIA	U+0387	Po, other	Common
،	ARABIC COMMA	U+060C	Po, other	Common
؛	ARABIC SEMICOLON	U+061B	Po, other	Common
؟	ARABIC QUESTION MARK	U+061F	Po, other	Common
।	DEVANAGARI DANDA	U+0964	Po, other	Common
॥	DEVANAGARI DOUBLE DANDA	U+0965	Po, other	Common
჻	GEORGIAN PARAGRAPH SEPARATOR	U+10FB	Po, other	Common
᛫	RUNIC SINGLE PUNCTUATION	U+16EB	Po, other	Common
᛬	RUNIC MULTIPLE PUNCTUATION	U+16EC	Po, other	Common
᛭	RUNIC CROSS PUNCTUATION	U+16ED	Po, other	Common
᜵	PHILIPPINE SINGLE PUNCTUATION	U+1735	Po, other	Common
᜶	PHILIPPINE DOUBLE PUNCTUATION	U+1736	Po, other	Common
᠂	MONGOLIAN COMMA	U+1802	Po, other	Common
᠃	MONGOLIAN FULL STOP	U+1803	Po, other	Common
᠅	MONGOLIAN FOUR DOTS	U+1805	Po, other	Common
᳓	VEDIC SIGN NIHSHVASA	U+1CD3	Po, other	Common
‖	DOUBLE VERTICAL LINE	U+2016	Po, other	Common
‗	DOUBLE LOW LINE	U+2017	Po, other	Common
†	DAGGER	U+2020	Po, other	Common
‡	DOUBLE DAGGER	U+2021	Po, other	Common
•	BULLET	U+2022	Po, other	Common
‣	TRIANGULAR BULLET	U+2023	Po, other	Common
․	ONE DOT LEADER	U+2024	Po, other	Common
‥	TWO DOT LEADER	U+2025	Po, other	Common
…	HORIZONTAL ELLIPSIS	U+2026	Po, other	Common
‧	HYPHENATION POINT	U+2027	Po, other	Common
‰	PER MILLE SIGN	U+2030	Po, other	Common
‱	PER TEN THOUSAND SIGN	U+2031	Po, other	Common
′	PRIME	U+2032	Po, other	Common
″	DOUBLE PRIME	U+2033	Po, other	Common
‴	TRIPLE PRIME	U+2034	Po, other	Common
‵	REVERSED PRIME	U+2035	Po, other	Common
‶	REVERSED DOUBLE PRIME	U+2036	Po, other	Common
‷	REVERSED TRIPLE PRIME	U+2037	Po, other	Common
‸	CARET	U+2038	Po, other	Common
※	REFERENCE MARK	U+203B	Po, other	Common
‼	DOUBLE EXCLAMATION MARK	U+203C	Po, other	Common
‽	INTERROBANG	U+203D	Po, other	Common
‾	OVERLINE	U+203E	Po, other	Common
⁁	CARET INSERTION POINT	U+2041	Po, other	Common
⁂	ASTERISM	U+2042	Po, other	Common
⁃	HYPHEN BULLET	U+2043	Po, other	Common
⁇	DOUBLE QUESTION MARK	U+2047	Po, other	Common
⁈	QUESTION EXCLAMATION MARK	U+2048	Po, other	Common
⁉	EXCLAMATION QUESTION MARK	U+2049	Po, other	Common
⁊	TIRONIAN SIGN ET	U+204A	Po, other	Common
⁋	REVERSED PILCROW SIGN	U+204B	Po, other	Common
⁌	BLACK LEFTWARDS BULLET	U+204C	Po, other	Common
⁍	BLACK RIGHTWARDS BULLET	U+204D	Po, other	Common
⁎	LOW ASTERISK	U+204E	Po, other	Common
⁏	REVERSED SEMICOLON	U+204F	Po, other	Common
⁐	CLOSE UP	U+2050	Po, other	Common
⁑	TWO ASTERISKS ALIGNED VERTICALLY	U+2051	Po, other	Common
⁓	SWUNG DASH	U+2053	Po, other	Common
⁕	FLOWER PUNCTUATION MARK	U+2055	Po, other	Common
⁖	THREE DOT PUNCTUATION	U+2056	Po, other	Common
⁗	QUADRUPLE PRIME	U+2057	Po, other	Common
⁘	FOUR DOT PUNCTUATION	U+2058	Po, other	Common
⁙	FIVE DOT PUNCTUATION	U+2059	Po, other	Common
⁚	TWO DOT PUNCTUATION	U+205A	Po, other	Common
⁛	FOUR DOT MARK	U+205B	Po, other	Common
⁜	DOTTED CROSS	U+205C	Po, other	Common
⁝	TRICOLON	U+205D	Po, other	Common
⁞	VERTICAL FOUR DOTS	U+205E	Po, other	Common
⸀	RIGHT ANGLE SUBSTITUTION MARKER	U+2E00	Po, other	Common
⸁	RIGHT ANGLE DOTTED SUBSTITUTION MARKER	U+2E01	Po, other	Common
⸆	RAISED INTERPOLATION MARKER	U+2E06	Po, other	Common
⸇	RAISED DOTTED INTERPOLATION MARKER	U+2E07	Po, other	Common
⸈	DOTTED TRANSPOSITION MARKER	U+2E08	Po, other	Common
⸋	RAISED SQUARE	U+2E0B	Po, other	Common
⸎	EDITORIAL CORONIS	U+2E0E	Po, other	Common
⸏	PARAGRAPHOS	U+2E0F	Po, other	Common
⸐	FORKED PARAGRAPHOS	U+2E10	Po, other	Common
⸑	REVERSED FORKED PARAGRAPHOS	U+2E11	Po, other	Common
⸒	HYPODIASTOLE	U+2E12	Po, other	Common
⸓	DOTTED OBELOS	U+2E13	Po, other	Common
⸔	DOWNWARDS ANCORA	U+2E14	Po, other	Common
⸕	UPWARDS ANCORA	U+2E15	Po, other	Common
⸖	DOTTED RIGHT-POINTING ANGLE	U+2E16	Po, other	Common
⸘	INVERTED INTERROBANG	U+2E18	Po, other	Common
⸙	PALM BRANCH	U+2E19	Po, other	Common
⸛	TILDE WITH RING ABOVE	U+2E1B	Po, other	Common
⸞	TILDE WITH DOT ABOVE	U+2E1E	Po, other	Common
⸟	TILDE WITH DOT BELOW	U+2E1F	Po, other	Common
⸪	TWO DOTS OVER ONE DOT PUNCTUATION	U+2E2A	Po, other	Common
⸫	ONE DOT OVER TWO DOTS PUNCTUATION	U+2E2B	Po, other	Common
⸬	SQUARED FOUR DOT PUNCTUATION	U+2E2C	Po, other	Common
⸭	FIVE DOT MARK	U+2E2D	Po, other	Common
⸮	REVERSED QUESTION MARK	U+2E2E	Po, other	Common
⸰	RING POINT	U+2E30	Po, other	Common
⸱	WORD SEPARATOR MIDDLE DOT	U+2E31	Po, other	Common
⸲	TURNED COMMA	U+2E32	Po, other	Common
⸳	RAISED DOT	U+2E33	Po, other	Common
⸴	RAISED COMMA	U+2E34	Po, other	Common
⸵	TURNED SEMICOLON	U+2E35	Po, other	Common
⸶	DAGGER WITH LEFT GUARD	U+2E36	Po, other	Common
⸷	DAGGER WITH RIGHT GUARD	U+2E37	Po, other	Common
⸸	TURNED DAGGER	U+2E38	Po, other	Common
⸹	TOP HALF SECTION SIGN	U+2E39	Po, other	Common
⸼	STENOGRAPHIC FULL STOP	U+2E3C	Po, other	Common
⸽	VERTICAL SIX DOTS	U+2E3D	Po, other	Common
⸾	WIGGLY VERTICAL LINE	U+2E3E	Po, other	Common
⸿	CAPITULUM	U+2E3F	Po, other	Common
⹁	REVERSED COMMA	U+2E41	Po, other	Common
⹃	DASH WITH LEFT UPTURN	U+2E43	Po, other	Common
⹄	DOUBLE SUSPENSION MARK	U+2E44	Po, other	Common
⹅	INVERTED LOW KAVYKA	U+2E45	Po, other	Common
⹆	INVERTED LOW KAVYKA WITH KAVYKA ABOVE	U+2E46	Po, other	Common
⹇	LOW KAVYKA	U+2E47	Po, other	Common
⹈	LOW KAVYKA WITH DOT	U+2E48	Po, other	Common
⹉	DOUBLE STACKED COMMA	U+2E49	Po, other	Common
⹊	DOTTED SOLIDUS	U+2E4A	Po, other	Common
⹋	TRIPLE DAGGER	U+2E4B	Po, other	Common
⹌	MEDIEVAL COMMA	U+2E4C	Po, other	Common
⹍	PARAGRAPHUS MARK	U+2E4D	Po, other	Common
⹎	PUNCTUS ELEVATUS MARK	U+2E4E	Po, other	Common
⹏	CORNISH VERSE DIVIDER	U+2E4F	Po, other	Common
⹒	TIRONIAN SIGN CAPITAL ET	U+2E52	Po, other	Common
⹠	WIGGLY EXCLAMATION MARK	U+2E60	Po, other	Common
⹡	INVERTED WIGGLY EXCLAMATION MARK	U+2E61	Po, other	Common
、	IDEOGRAPHIC COMMA	U+3001	Po, other	Common
。	IDEOGRAPHIC FULL STOP	U+3002	Po, other	Common
〃	DITTO MARK	U+3003	Po, other	Common
〽	PART ALTERNATION MARK	U+303D	Po, other	Common
・	KATAKANA MIDDLE DOT	U+30FB	Po, other	Common
꤮	KAYAH LI SIGN CWI	U+A92E	Po, other	Common
︐	PRESENTATION FORM FOR VERTICAL COMMA	U+FE10	Po, other	Common
︑	PRESENTATION FORM FOR VERTICAL IDEOGRAPHIC COMMA	U+FE11	Po, other	Common
︒	PRESENTATION FORM FOR VERTICAL IDEOGRAPHIC FULL STOP	U+FE12	Po, other	Common
︓	PRESENTATION FORM FOR VERTICAL COLON	U+FE13	Po, other	Common
︔	PRESENTATION FORM FOR VERTICAL SEMICOLON	U+FE14	Po, other	Common
︕	PRESENTATION FORM FOR VERTICAL EXCLAMATION MARK	U+FE15	Po, other	Common
︖	PRESENTATION FORM FOR VERTICAL QUESTION MARK	U+FE16	Po, other	Common
︙	PRESENTATION FORM FOR VERTICAL HORIZONTAL ELLIPSIS	U+FE19	Po, other	Common
︰	PRESENTATION FORM FOR VERTICAL TWO DOT LEADER	U+FE30	Po, other	Common
﹅	SESAME DOT	U+FE45	Po, other	Common
﹆	WHITE SESAME DOT	U+FE46	Po, other	Common
﹉	DASHED OVERLINE	U+FE49	Po, other	Common
﹊	CENTRELINE OVERLINE	U+FE4A	Po, other	Common
﹋	WAVY OVERLINE	U+FE4B	Po, other	Common
﹌	DOUBLE WAVY OVERLINE	U+FE4C	Po, other	Common
﹐	SMALL COMMA	U+FE50	Po, other	Common
﹑	SMALL IDEOGRAPHIC COMMA	U+FE51	Po, other	Common
﹒	SMALL FULL STOP	U+FE52	Po, other	Common
﹔	SMALL SEMICOLON	U+FE54	Po, other	Common
﹕	SMALL COLON	U+FE55	Po, other	Common
﹖	SMALL QUESTION MARK	U+FE56	Po, other	Common
﹗	SMALL EXCLAMATION MARK	U+FE57	Po, other	Common
﹟	SMALL NUMBER SIGN	U+FE5F	Po, other	Common
﹠	SMALL AMPERSAND	U+FE60	Po, other	Common
﹡	SMALL ASTERISK	U+FE61	Po, other	Common
﹨	SMALL REVERSE SOLIDUS	U+FE68	Po, other	Common
﹪	SMALL PERCENT SIGN	U+FE6A	Po, other	Common
﹫	SMALL COMMERCIAL AT	U+FE6B	Po, other	Common
！	FULLWIDTH EXCLAMATION MARK	U+FF01	Po, other	Common
＂	FULLWIDTH QUOTATION MARK	U+FF02	Po, other	Common
＃	FULLWIDTH NUMBER SIGN	U+FF03	Po, other	Common
％	FULLWIDTH PERCENT SIGN	U+FF05	Po, other	Common
＆	FULLWIDTH AMPERSAND	U+FF06	Po, other	Common
＇	FULLWIDTH APOSTROPHE	U+FF07	Po, other	Common
＊	FULLWIDTH ASTERISK	U+FF0A	Po, other	Common
，	FULLWIDTH COMMA	U+FF0C	Po, other	Common
．	FULLWIDTH FULL STOP	U+FF0E	Po, other	Common
／	FULLWIDTH SOLIDUS	U+FF0F	Po, other	Common
：	FULLWIDTH COLON	U+FF1A	Po, other	Common
；	FULLWIDTH SEMICOLON	U+FF1B	Po, other	Common
？	FULLWIDTH QUESTION MARK	U+FF1F	Po, other	Common
＠	FULLWIDTH COMMERCIAL AT	U+FF20	Po, other	Common
＼	FULLWIDTH REVERSE SOLIDUS	U+FF3C	Po, other	Common
｡	HALFWIDTH IDEOGRAPHIC FULL STOP	U+FF61	Po, other	Common
､	HALFWIDTH IDEOGRAPHIC COMMA	U+FF64	Po, other	Common
･	HALFWIDTH KATAKANA MIDDLE DOT	U+FF65	Po, other	Common
𐄀	AEGEAN WORD SEPARATOR LINE	U+10100	Po, other	Common
𐄁	AEGEAN WORD SEPARATOR DOT	U+10101	Po, other	Common
𐄂	AEGEAN CHECK MARK	U+10102	Po, other	Common
𖿢	OLD CHINESE HOOK MARK	U+16FE2	Po, other	Common
𞥞	ADLAM INITIAL EXCLAMATION MARK	U+1E95E	Po, other	Adlam
𞥟	ADLAM INITIAL QUESTION MARK	U+1E95F	Po, other	Adlam
՚	ARMENIAN APOSTROPHE	U+055A	Po, other	Armenian
՛	ARMENIAN EMPHASIS MARK	U+055B	Po, other	Armenian
՜	ARMENIAN EXCLAMATION MARK	U+055C	Po, other	Armenian
՝	ARMENIAN COMMA	U+055D	Po, other	Armenian
՞	ARMENIAN QUESTION MARK	U+055E	Po, other	Armenian
՟	ARMENIAN ABBREVIATION MARK	U+055F	Po, other	Armenian
։	ARMENIAN FULL STOP	U+0589	Po, other	Armenian
؉	ARABIC-INDIC PER MILLE SIGN	U+0609	Po, other	Arabic
؊	ARABIC-INDIC PER TEN THOUSAND SIGN	U+060A	Po, other	Arabic
؍	ARABIC DATE SEPARATOR	U+060D	Po, other	Arabic
؞	ARABIC TRIPLE DOT PUNCTUATION MARK	U+061E	Po, other	Arabic
٪	ARABIC PERCENT SIGN	U+066A	Po, other	Arabic
٫	ARABIC DECIMAL SEPARATOR	U+066B	Po, other	Arabic
٬	ARABIC THOUSANDS SEPARATOR	U+066C	Po, other	Arabic
٭	ARABIC FIVE POINTED STAR	U+066D	Po, other	Arabic
۔	ARABIC FULL STOP	U+06D4	Po, other	Arabic
𑜼	AHOM SIGN SMALL SECTION	U+1173C	Po, other	Ahom
𑜽	AHOM SIGN SECTION	U+1173D	Po, other	Ahom
𑜾	AHOM SIGN RULAI	U+1173E	Po, other	Ahom
𐬹	AVESTAN ABBREVIATION MARK	U+10B39	Po, other	Avestan
𐬺	TINY TWO DOTS OVER ONE DOT PUNCTUATION	U+10B3A	Po, other	Avestan
𐬻	SMALL TWO DOTS OVER ONE DOT PUNCTUATION	U+10B3B	Po, other	Avestan
𐬼	LARGE TWO DOTS OVER ONE DOT PUNCTUATION	U+10B3C	Po, other	Avestan
𐬽	LARGE ONE DOT OVER TWO DOTS PUNCTUATION	U+10B3D	Po, other	Avestan
𐬾	LARGE TWO RINGS OVER ONE RING PUNCTUATION	U+10B3E	Po, other	Avestan
𐬿	LARGE ONE RING OVER TWO RINGS PUNCTUATION	U+10B3F	Po, other	Avestan
᭚	BALINESE PANTI	U+1B5A	Po, other	Balinese
᭛	BALINESE PAMADA	U+1B5B	Po, other	Balinese
᭜	BALINESE WINDU	U+1B5C	Po, other	Balinese
᭝	BALINESE CARIK PAMUNGKAH	U+1B5D	Po, other	Balinese
᭞	BALINESE CARIK SIKI	U+1B5E	Po, other	Balinese
᭟	BALINESE CARIK PAREREN	U+1B5F	Po, other	Balinese
᭠	BALINESE PAMENENG	U+1B60	Po, other	Balinese
꛲	BAMUM NJAEMLI	U+A6F2	Po, other	Bamum
꛳	BAMUM FULL STOP	U+A6F3	Po, other	Bamum
꛴	BAMUM COLON	U+A6F4	Po, other	Bamum
꛵	BAMUM COMMA	U+A6F5	Po, other	Bamum
꛶	BAMUM SEMICOLON	U+A6F6	Po, other	Bamum
꛷	BAMUM QUESTION MARK	U+A6F7	Po, other	Bamum
𖫵	BASSA VAH FULL STOP	U+16AF5	Po, other	Bassa Vah
᯼	BATAK SYMBOL BINDU NA METEK	U+1BFC	Po, other	Batak
᯽	BATAK SYMBOL BINDU PINARBORAS	U+1BFD	Po, other	Batak
᯾	BATAK SYMBOL BINDU JUDUL	U+1BFE	Po, other	Batak
᯿	BATAK SYMBOL BINDU PANGOLAT	U+1BFF	Po, other	Batak
৽	BENGALI ABBREVIATION SIGN	U+09FD	Po, other	Bengali
𑱁	BHAIKSUKI DANDA	U+11C41	Po, other	Bhaiksuki
𑱂	BHAIKSUKI DOUBLE DANDA	U+11C42	Po, other	Bhaiksuki
𑱃	BHAIKSUKI WORD SEPARATOR	U+11C43	Po, other	Bhaiksuki
𑱄	BHAIKSUKI GAP FILLER-1	U+11C44	Po, other	Bhaiksuki
𑱅	BHAIKSUKI GAP FILLER-2	U+11C45	Po, other	Bhaiksuki
𑁇	BRAHMI DANDA	U+11047	Po, other	Brahmi
𑁈	BRAHMI DOUBLE DANDA	U+11048	Po, other	Brahmi
𑁉	BRAHMI PUNCTUATION DOT	U+11049	Po, other	Brahmi
𑁊	BRAHMI PUNCTUATION DOUBLE DOT	U+1104A	Po, other	Brahmi
𑁋	BRAHMI PUNCTUATION LINE	U+1104B	Po, other	Brahmi
𑁌	BRAHMI PUNCTUATION CRESCENT BAR	U+1104C	Po, other	Brahmi
𑁍	BRAHMI PUNCTUATION LOTUS	U+1104D	Po, other	Brahmi
᨞	BUGINESE PALLAWA	U+1A1E	Po, other	Buginese
᨟	BUGINESE END OF SECTION	U+1A1F	Po, other	Buginese
᙮	CANADIAN SYLLABICS FULL STOP	U+166E	Po, other	Canadian Aboriginal
𑅀	CHAKMA SECTION MARK	U+11140	Po, other	Chakma
𑅁	CHAKMA DANDA	U+11141	Po, other	Chakma
𑅂	CHAKMA DOUBLE DANDA	U+11142	Po, other	Chakma
𑅃	CHAKMA QUESTION MARK	U+11143	Po, other	Chakma
꩜	CHAM PUNCTUATION SPIRAL	U+AA5C	Po, other	Cham
꩝	CHAM PUNCTUATION DANDA	U+AA5D	Po, other	Cham
꩞	CHAM PUNCTUATION DOUBLE DANDA	U+AA5E	Po, other	Cham
꩟	CHAM PUNCTUATION TRIPLE DANDA	U+AA5F	Po, other	Cham
⳹	COPTIC OLD NUBIAN FULL STOP	U+2CF9	Po, other	Coptic
⳺	COPTIC OLD NUBIAN DIRECT QUESTION MARK	U+2CFA	Po, other	Coptic
⳻	COPTIC OLD NUBIAN INDIRECT QUESTION MARK	U+2CFB	Po, other	Coptic
⳼	COPTIC OLD NUBIAN VERSE DIVIDER	U+2CFC	Po, other	Coptic
⳾	COPTIC FULL STOP	U+2CFE	Po, other	Coptic
⳿	COPTIC MORPHOLOGICAL DIVIDER	U+2CFF	Po, other	Coptic
𒑰	CUNEIFORM PUNCTUATION SIGN OLD ASSYRIAN WORD DIVIDER	U+12470	Po, other	Cuneiform
𒑱	CUNEIFORM PUNCTUATION SIGN VERTICAL COLON	U+12471	Po, other	Cuneiform
𒑲	CUNEIFORM PUNCTUATION SIGN DIAGONAL COLON	U+12472	Po, other	Cuneiform
𒑳	CUNEIFORM PUNCTUATION SIGN DIAGONAL TRICOLON	U+12473	Po, other	Cuneiform
𒑴	CUNEIFORM PUNCTUATION SIGN DIAGONAL QUADCOLON	U+12474	Po, other	Cuneiform
꙳	SLAVONIC ASTERISK	U+A673	Po, other	Cyrillic
꙾	CYRILLIC KAVYKA	U+A67E	Po, other	Cyrillic
𐕯	CAUCASIAN ALBANIAN CITATION MARK	U+1056F	Po, other	Caucasian Albanian
॰	DEVANAGARI ABBREVIATION SIGN	U+0970	Po, other	Devanagari
꣸	DEVANAGARI SIGN PUSHPIKA	U+A8F8	Po, other	Devanagari
꣹	DEVANAGARI GAP FILLER	U+A8F9	Po, other	Devanagari
꣺	DEVANAGARI CARET	U+A8FA	Po, other	Devanagari
꣼	DEVANAGARI SIGN SIDDHAM	U+A8FC	Po, other	Devanagari
𑥄	DIVES AKURU DOUBLE DANDA	U+11944	Po, other	Dives Akuru
𑥅	DIVES AKURU GAP FILLER	U+11945	Po, other	Dives Akuru
𑥆	DIVES AKURU END OF TEXT MARK	U+11946	Po, other	Dives Akuru
𑠻	DOGRA ABBREVIATION SIGN	U+1183B	Po, other	Dogra
𛲟	DUPLOYAN PUNCTUATION CHINOOK FULL STOP	U+1BC9F	Po, other	Duployan
፠	ETHIOPIC SECTION MARK	U+1360	Po, other	Ethiopic
፡	ETHIOPIC WORDSPACE	U+1361	Po, other	Ethiopic
።	ETHIOPIC FULL STOP	U+1362	Po, other	Ethiopic
፣	ETHIOPIC COMMA	U+1363	Po, other	Ethiopic
፤	ETHIOPIC SEMICOLON	U+1364	Po, other	Ethiopic
፥	ETHIOPIC COLON	U+1365	Po, other	Ethiopic
፦	ETHIOPIC PREFACE COLON	U+1366	Po, other	Ethiopic
፧	ETHIOPIC QUESTION MARK	U+1367	Po, other	Ethiopic
፨	ETHIOPIC PARAGRAPH SEPARATOR	U+1368	Po, other	Ethiopic
੶	GURMUKHI ABBREVIATION SIGN	U+0A76	Po, other	Gurmukhi
૰	GUJARATI ABBREVIATION SIGN	U+0AF0	Po, other	Gujarati
׀	HEBREW PUNCTUATION PASEQ	U+05C0	Po, other	Hebrew
׃	HEBREW PUNCTUATION SOF PASUQ	U+05C3	Po, other	Hebrew
׆	HEBREW PUNCTUATION NUN HAFUKHA	U+05C6	Po, other	Hebrew
׳	HEBREW PUNCTUATION GERESH	U+05F3	Po, other	Hebrew
״	HEBREW PUNCTUATION GERSHAYIM	U+05F4	Po, other	Hebrew
𐡗	IMPERIAL ARAMAIC SECTION SIGN	U+10857	Po, other	Imperial Aramaic
꧁	JAVANESE LEFT RERENGGAN	U+A9C1	Po, other	Javanese
꧂	JAVANESE RIGHT RERENGGAN	U+A9C2	Po, other	Javanese
꧃	JAVANESE PADA ANDAP	U+A9C3	Po, other	Javanese
꧄	JAVANESE PADA MADYA	U+A9C4	Po, other	Javanese
꧅	JAVANESE PADA LUHUR	U+A9C5	Po, other	Javanese
꧆	JAVANESE PADA WINDU	U+A9C6	Po, other	Javanese
꧇	JAVANESE PADA PANGKAT	U+A9C7	Po, other	Javanese
꧈	JAVANESE PADA LINGSA	U+A9C8	Po, other	Javanese
꧉	JAVANESE PADA LUNGSI	U+A9C9	Po, other	Javanese
꧊	JAVANESE PADA ADEG	U+A9CA	Po, other	Javanese
꧋	JAVANESE PADA ADEG ADEG	U+A9CB	Po, other	Javanese
꧌	JAVANESE PADA PISELEH	U+A9CC	Po, other	Javanese
꧍	JAVANESE TURNED PADA PISELEH	U+A9CD	Po, other	Javanese
꧞	JAVANESE PADA TIRTA TUMETES	U+A9DE	Po, other	Javanese
꧟	JAVANESE PADA ISEN-ISEN	U+A9DF	Po, other	Javanese
𑂻	KAITHI ABBREVIATION SIGN	U+110BB	Po, other	Kaithi
𑂼	KAITHI ENUMERATION SIGN	U+110BC	Po, other	Kaithi
𑂾	KAITHI SECTION MARK	U+110BE	Po, other	Kaithi
𑂿	KAITHI DOUBLE SECTION MARK	U+110BF	Po, other	Kaithi
𑃀	KAITHI DANDA	U+110C0	Po, other	Kaithi
𑃁	KAITHI DOUBLE DANDA	U+110C1	Po, other	Kaithi
಄	KANNADA SIGN SIDDHAM	U+0C84	Po, other	Kannada
꤯	KAYAH LI SIGN SHYA	U+A92F	Po, other	Kayah Li
𐩐	KHAROSHTHI PUNCTUATION DOT	U+10A50	Po, other	Kharoshthi
𐩑	KHAROSHTHI PUNCTUATION SMALL CIRCLE	U+10A51	Po, other	Kharoshthi
𐩒	KHAROSHTHI PUNCTUATION CIRCLE	U+10A52	Po, other	Kharoshthi
𐩓	KHAROSHTHI PUNCTUATION CRESCENT BAR	U+10A53	Po, other	Kharoshthi
𐩔	KHAROSHTHI PUNCTUATION MANGALAM	U+10A54	Po, other	Kharoshthi
𐩕	KHAROSHTHI PUNCTUATION LOTUS	U+10A55	Po, other	Kharoshthi
𐩖	KHAROSHTHI PUNCTUATION DANDA	U+10A56	Po, other	Kharoshthi
𐩗	KHAROSHTHI PUNCTUATION DOUBLE DANDA	U+10A57	Po, other	Kharoshthi
𐩘	KHAROSHTHI PUNCTUATION LINES	U+10A58	Po, other	Kharoshthi
។	KHMER SIGN KHAN	U+17D4	Po, other	Khmer
៕	KHMER SIGN BARIYOOSAN	U+17D5	Po, other	Khmer
៖	KHMER SIGN CAMNUC PII KUUH	U+17D6	Po, other	Khmer
៘	KHMER SIGN BEYYAL	U+17D8	Po, other	Khmer
៙	KHMER SIGN PHNAEK MUAN	U+17D9	Po, other	Khmer
៚	KHMER SIGN KOOMUUT	U+17DA	Po, other	Khmer
𑈸	KHOJKI DANDA	U+11238	Po, other	Khojki
𑈹	KHOJKI DOUBLE DANDA	U+11239	Po, other	Khojki
𑈺	KHOJKI WORD SEPARATOR	U+1123A	Po, other	Khojki
𑈻	KHOJKI SECTION MARK	U+1123B	Po, other	Khojki
𑈼	KHOJKI DOUBLE SECTION MARK	U+1123C	Po, other	Khojki
𑈽	KHOJKI ABBREVIATION SIGN	U+1123D	Po, other	Khojki
᰻	LEPCHA PUNCTUATION TA-ROL	U+1C3B	Po, other	Lepcha
᰼	LEPCHA PUNCTUATION NYET THYOOM TA-ROL	U+1C3C	Po, other	Lepcha
᰽	LEPCHA PUNCTUATION CER-WA	U+1C3D	Po, other	Lepcha
᰾	LEPCHA PUNCTUATION TSHOOK CER-WA	U+1C3E	Po, other	Lepcha
᰿	LEPCHA PUNCTUATION TSHOOK	U+1C3F	Po, other	Lepcha
᥄	LIMBU EXCLAMATION MARK	U+1944	Po, other	Limbu
᥅	LIMBU QUESTION MARK	U+1945	Po, other	Limbu
꓾	LISU PUNCTUATION COMMA	U+A4FE	Po, other	Lisu
꓿	LISU PUNCTUATION FULL STOP	U+A4FF	Po, other	Lisu
𐤿	LYDIAN TRIANGULAR MARK	U+1093F	Po, other	Lydian
𑅴	MAHAJANI ABBREVIATION SIGN	U+11174	Po, other	Mahajani
𑅵	MAHAJANI SECTION MARK	U+11175	Po, other	Mahajani
𑻷	MAKASAR PASSIMBANG	U+11EF7	Po, other	Makasar
𑻸	MAKASAR END OF SECTION	U+11EF8	Po, other	Makasar
𐫰	MANICHAEAN PUNCTUATION STAR	U+10AF0	Po, other	Manichaean
𐫱	MANICHAEAN PUNCTUATION FLEURON	U+10AF1	Po, other	Manichaean
𐫲	MANICHAEAN PUNCTUATION DOUBLE DOT WITHIN DOT	U+10AF2	Po, other	Manichaean
𐫳	MANICHAEAN PUNCTUATION DOT WITHIN DOT	U+10AF3	Po, other	Manichaean
𐫴	MANICHAEAN PUNCTUATION DOT	U+10AF4	Po, other	Manichaean
𐫵	MANICHAEAN PUNCTUATION TWO DOTS	U+10AF5	Po, other	Manichaean
𐫶	MANICHAEAN PUNCTUATION LINE FILLER	U+10AF6	Po, other	Manichaean
𑱰	MARCHEN HEAD MARK	U+11C70	Po, other	Marchen
𑱱	MARCHEN MARK SHAD	U+11C71	Po, other	Marchen
𖺗	MEDEFAIDRIN COMMA	U+16E97	Po, other	Medefaidrin
𖺘	MEDEFAIDRIN FULL STOP	U+16E98	Po, other	Medefaidrin
𖺙	MEDEFAIDRIN SYMBOL AIVA	U+16E99	Po, other	Medefaidrin
𖺚	MEDEFAIDRIN EXCLAMATION OH	U+16E9A	Po, other	Medefaidrin
꫰	MEETEI MAYEK CHEIKHAN	U+AAF0	Po, other	Meetei Mayek
꫱	MEETEI MAYEK AHANG KHUDAM	U+AAF1	Po, other	Meetei Mayek
꯫	MEETEI MAYEK CHEIKHEI	U+ABEB	Po, other	Meetei Mayek
𑙁	MODI DANDA	U+11641	Po, other	Modi
𑙂	MODI DOUBLE DANDA	U+11642	Po, other	Modi
𑙃	MODI ABBREVIATION SIGN	U+11643	Po, other	Modi
᠀	MONGOLIAN BIRGA	U+1800	Po, other	Mongolian
᠁	MONGOLIAN ELLIPSIS	U+1801	Po, other	Mongolian
᠄	MONGOLIAN COLON	U+1804	Po, other	Mongolian
᠇	MONGOLIAN SIBE SYLLABLE BOUNDARY MARKER	U+1807	Po, other	Mongolian
᠈	MONGOLIAN MANCHU COMMA	U+1808	Po, other	Mongolian
᠉	MONGOLIAN MANCHU FULL STOP	U+1809	Po, other	Mongolian
᠊	MONGOLIAN NIRUGU	U+180A	Po, other	Mongolian
𑙠	MONGOLIAN BIRGA WITH ORNAMENT	U+11660	Po, other	Mongolian
𑙡	MONGOLIAN ROTATED BIRGA	U+11661	Po, other	Mongolian
𑙢	MONGOLIAN DOUBLE BIRGA WITH ORNAMENT	U+11662	Po, other	Mongolian
𑙣	MONGOLIAN TRIPLE BIRGA WITH ORNAMENT	U+11663	Po, other	Mongolian
𑙤	MONGOLIAN BIRGA WITH DOUBLE ORNAMENT	U+11664	Po, other	Mongolian
𑙥	MONGOLIAN ROTATED BIRGA WITH ORNAMENT	U+11665	Po, other	Mongolian
𑙦	MONGOLIAN ROTATED BIRGA WITH DOUBLE ORNAMENT	U+11666	Po, other	Mongolian
𑙧	MONGOLIAN INVERTED BIRGA	U+11667	Po, other	Mongolian
𑙨	MONGOLIAN INVERTED BIRGA WITH DOUBLE ORNAMENT	U+11668	Po, other	Mongolian
𑙩	MONGOLIAN SWIRL BIRGA	U+11669	Po, other	Mongolian
𑙪	MONGOLIAN SWIRL BIRGA WITH ORNAMENT	U+1166A	Po, other	Mongolian
𑙫	MONGOLIAN SWIRL BIRGA WITH DOUBLE ORNAMENT	U+1166B	Po, other	Mongolian
𑙬	MONGOLIAN TURNED SWIRL BIRGA WITH DOUBLE ORNAMENT	U+1166C	Po, other	Mongolian
𖩮	MRO DANDA	U+16A6E	Po, other	Mro
𖩯	MRO DOUBLE DANDA	U+16A6F	Po, other	Mro
𑊩	MULTANI SECTION MARK	U+112A9	Po, other	Multani
၊	MYANMAR SIGN LITTLE SECTION	U+104A	Po, other	Myanmar
။	MYANMAR SIGN SECTION	U+104B	Po, other	Myanmar
၌	MYANMAR SYMBOL LOCATIVE	U+104C	Po, other	Myanmar
၍	MYANMAR SYMBOL COMPLETED	U+104D	Po, other	Myanmar
၎	MYANMAR SYMBOL AFOREMENTIONED	U+104E	Po, other	Myanmar
၏	MYANMAR SYMBOL GENITIVE	U+104F	Po, other	Myanmar
߷	NKO SYMBOL GBAKURUNEN	U+07F7	Po, other	N'Ko
߸	NKO COMMA	U+07F8	Po, other	N'Ko
߹	NKO EXCLAMATION MARK	U+07F9	Po, other	N'Ko
𑧢	NANDINAGARI SIGN SIDDHAM	U+119E2	Po, other	Nandinagari
𑑋	NEWA DANDA	U+1144B	Po, other	Newa
𑑌	NEWA DOUBLE DANDA	U+1144C	Po, other	Newa
𑑍	NEWA COMMA	U+1144D	Po, other	Newa
𑑎	NEWA GAP FILLER	U+1144E	Po, other	Newa
𑑏	NEWA ABBREVIATION SIGN	U+1144F	Po, other	Newa
𑑚	NEWA DOUBLE COMMA	U+1145A	Po, other	Newa
𑑛	NEWA PLACEHOLDER MARK	U+1145B	Po, other	Newa
𑑝	NEWA INSERTION SIGN	U+1145D	Po, other	Newa
᱾	OL CHIKI PUNCTUATION MUCAAD	U+1C7E	Po, other	Ol Chiki
᱿	OL CHIKI PUNCTUATION DOUBLE MUCAAD	U+1C7F	Po, other	Ol Chiki
𐏐	OLD PERSIAN WORD DIVIDER	U+103D0	Po, other	Old Persian
𐩿	OLD SOUTH ARABIAN NUMERIC INDICATOR	U+10A7F	Po, other	Old South Arabian
𖬷	PAHAWH HMONG SIGN VOS THOM	U+16B37	Po, other	Pahawh Hmong
𖬸	PAHAWH HMONG SIGN VOS TSHAB CEEB	U+16B38	Po, other	Pahawh Hmong
𖬹	PAHAWH HMONG SIGN CIM CHEEM	U+16B39	Po, other	Pahawh Hmong
𖬺	PAHAWH HMONG SIGN VOS THIAB	U+16B3A	Po, other	Pahawh Hmong
𖬻	PAHAWH HMONG SIGN VOS FEEM	U+16B3B	Po, other	Pahawh Hmong
𖭄	PAHAWH HMONG SIGN XAUS	U+16B44	Po, other	Pahawh Hmong
꡴	PHAGS-PA SINGLE HEAD MARK	U+A874	Po, other	Phags-pa
꡵	PHAGS-PA DOUBLE HEAD MARK	U+A875	Po, other	Phags-pa
꡶	PHAGS-PA MARK SHAD	U+A876	Po, other	Phags-pa
꡷	PHAGS-PA MARK DOUBLE SHAD	U+A877	Po, other	Phags-pa
𐤟	PHOENICIAN WORD SEPARATOR	U+1091F	Po, other	Phoenician
𐮙	PSALTER PAHLAVI SECTION MARK	U+10B99	Po, other	Psalter Pahlavi
𐮚	PSALTER PAHLAVI TURNED SECTION MARK	U+10B9A	Po, other	Psalter Pahlavi
𐮛	PSALTER PAHLAVI FOUR DOTS WITH CROSS	U+10B9B	Po, other	Psalter Pahlavi
𐮜	PSALTER PAHLAVI FOUR DOTS WITH DOT	U+10B9C	Po, other	Psalter Pahlavi
꥟	REJANG SECTION MARK	U+A95F	Po, other	Rejang
࠰	SAMARITAN PUNCTUATION NEQUDAA	U+0830	Po, other	Samaritan
࠱	SAMARITAN PUNCTUATION AFSAAQ	U+0831	Po, other	Samaritan
࠲	SAMARITAN PUNCTUATION ANGED	U+0832	Po, other	Samaritan
࠳	SAMARITAN PUNCTUATION BAU	U+0833	Po, other	Samaritan
࠴	SAMARITAN PUNCTUATION ATMAAU	U+0834	Po, other	Samaritan
࠵	SAMARITAN PUNCTUATION SHIYYAALAA	U+0835	Po, other	Samaritan
࠶	SAMARITAN ABBREVIATION MARK	U+0836	Po, other	Samaritan
࠷	SAMARITAN PUNCTUATION MELODIC QITSA	U+0837	Po, other	Samaritan
࠸	SAMARITAN PUNCTUATION ZIQAA	U+0838	Po, other	Samaritan
࠹	SAMARITAN PUNCTUATION QITSA	U+0839	Po, other	Samaritan
࠺	SAMARITAN PUNCTUATION ZAEF	U+083A	Po, other	Samaritan
࠻	SAMARITAN PUNCTUATION TURU	U+083B	Po, other	Samaritan
࠼	SAMARITAN PUNCTUATION ARKAANU	U+083C	Po, other	Samaritan
࠽	SAMARITAN PUNCTUATION SOF MASHFAAT	U+083D	Po, other	Samaritan
࠾	SAMARITAN PUNCTUATION ANNAAU	U+083E	Po, other	Samaritan
꣎	SAURASHTRA DANDA	U+A8CE	Po, other	Saurashtra
꣏	SAURASHTRA DOUBLE DANDA	U+A8CF	Po, other	Saurashtra
𑇅	SHARADA DANDA	U+111C5	Po, other	Sharada
𑇆	SHARADA DOUBLE DANDA	U+111C6	Po, other	Sharada
𑇇	SHARADA ABBREVIATION SIGN	U+111C7	Po, other	Sharada
𑇈	SHARADA SEPARATOR	U+111C8	Po, other	Sharada
𑇍	SHARADA SUTRA MARK	U+111CD	Po, other	Sharada
𑇛	SHARADA SIGN SIDDHAM	U+111DB	Po, other	Sharada
𑇝	SHARADA CONTINUATION SIGN	U+111DD	Po, other	Sharada
𑇞	SHARADA SECTION MARK-1	U+111DE	Po, other	Sharada
𑇟	SHARADA SECTION MARK-2	U+111DF	Po, other	Sharada
𑗁	SIDDHAM SIGN SIDDHAM	U+115C1	Po, other	Siddham
𑗂	SIDDHAM DANDA	U+115C2	Po, other	Siddham
𑗃	SIDDHAM DOUBLE DANDA	U+115C3	Po, other	Siddham
𑗄	SIDDHAM SEPARATOR DOT	U+115C4	Po, other	Siddham
𑗅	SIDDHAM SEPARATOR BAR	U+115C5	Po, other	Siddham
𑗆	SIDDHAM REPETITION MARK-1	U+115C6	Po, other	Siddham
𑗇	SIDDHAM REPETITION MARK-2	U+115C7	Po, other	Siddham
𑗈	SIDDHAM REPETITION MARK-3	U+115C8	Po, other	Siddham
𑗉	SIDDHAM END OF TEXT MARK	U+115C9	Po, other	Siddham
𑗊	SIDDHAM SECTION MARK WITH TRIDENT AND U-SHAPED ORNAMENTS	U+115CA	Po, other	Siddham
𑗋	SIDDHAM SECTION MARK WITH TRIDENT AND DOTTED CRESCENTS	U+115CB	Po, other	Siddham
𑗌	SIDDHAM SECTION MARK WITH RAYS AND DOTTED CRESCENTS	U+115CC	Po, other	Siddham
𑗍	SIDDHAM SECTION MARK WITH RAYS AND DOTTED DOUBLE CRESCENTS	U+115CD	Po, other	Siddham
𑗎	SIDDHAM SECTION MARK WITH RAYS AND DOTTED TRIPLE CRESCENTS	U+115CE	Po, other	Siddham
𑗏	SIDDHAM SECTION MARK DOUBLE RING	U+115CF	Po, other	Siddham
𑗐	SIDDHAM SECTION MARK DOUBLE RING WITH RAYS	U+115D0	Po, other	Siddham
𑗑	SIDDHAM SECTION MARK WITH DOUBLE CRESCENTS	U+115D1	Po, other	Siddham
𑗒	SIDDHAM SECTION MARK WITH TRIPLE CRESCENTS	U+115D2	Po, other	Siddham
𑗓	SIDDHAM SECTION MARK WITH QUADRUPLE CRESCENTS	U+115D3	Po, other	Siddham
𑗔	SIDDHAM SECTION MARK WITH SEPTUPLE CRESCENTS	U+115D4	Po, other	Siddham
𑗕	SIDDHAM SECTION MARK WITH CIRCLES AND RAYS	U+115D5	Po, other	Siddham
𑗖	SIDDHAM SECTION MARK WITH CIRCLES AND TWO ENCLOSURES	U+115D6	Po, other	Siddham
𑗗	SIDDHAM SECTION MARK WITH CIRCLES AND FOUR ENCLOSURES	U+115D7	Po, other	Siddham
𝪇	SIGNWRITING COMMA	U+1DA87	Po, other	SignWriting
𝪈	SIGNWRITING FULL STOP	U+1DA88	Po, other	SignWriting
𝪉	SIGNWRITING SEMICOLON	U+1DA89	Po, other	SignWriting
𝪊	SIGNWRITING COLON	U+1DA8A	Po, other	SignWriting
𝪋	SIGNWRITING PARENTHESIS	U+1DA8B	Po, other	SignWriting
෴	SINHALA PUNCTUATION KUNDDALIYA	U+0DF4	Po, other	Sinhala
𐽕	SOGDIAN PUNCTUATION TWO VERTICAL BARS	U+10F55	Po, other	Sogdian
𐽖	SOGDIAN PUNCTUATION TWO VERTICAL BARS WITH DOTS	U+10F56	Po, other	Sogdian
𐽗	SOGDIAN PUNCTUATION CIRCLE WITH DOT	U+10F57	Po, other	Sogdian
𐽘	SOGDIAN PUNCTUATION TWO CIRCLES WITH DOTS	U+10F58	Po, other	Sogdian
𐽙	SOGDIAN PUNCTUATION HALF CIRCLE WITH DOT	U+10F59	Po, other	Sogdian
𑪚	SOYOMBO MARK TSHEG	U+11A9A	Po, other	Soyombo
𑪛	SOYOMBO MARK SHAD	U+11A9B	Po, other	Soyombo
𑪜	SOYOMBO MARK DOUBLE SHAD	U+11A9C	Po, other	Soyombo
𑪞	SOYOMBO HEAD MARK WITH MOON AND SUN AND TRIPLE FLAME	U+11A9E	Po, other	Soyombo
𑪟	SOYOMBO HEAD MARK WITH MOON AND SUN AND FLAME	U+11A9F	Po, other	Soyombo
𑪠	SOYOMBO HEAD MARK WITH MOON AND SUN	U+11AA0	Po, other	Soyombo
𑪡	SOYOMBO TERMINAL MARK-1	U+11AA1	Po, other	Soyombo
𑪢	SOYOMBO TERMINAL MARK-2	U+11AA2	Po, other	Soyombo
᳀	SUNDANESE PUNCTUATION BINDU SURYA	U+1CC0	Po, other	Sundanese
᳁	SUNDANESE PUNCTUATION BINDU PANGLONG	U+1CC1	Po, other	Sundanese
᳂	SUNDANESE PUNCTUATION BINDU PURNAMA	U+1CC2	Po, other	Sundanese
᳃	SUNDANESE PUNCTUATION BINDU CAKRA	U+1CC3	Po, other	Sundanese
᳄	SUNDANESE PUNCTUATION BINDU LEU SATANGA	U+1CC4	Po, other	Sundanese
᳅	SUNDANESE PUNCTUATION BINDU KA SATANGA	U+1CC5	Po, other	Sundanese
᳆	SUNDANESE PUNCTUATION BINDU DA SATANGA	U+1CC6	Po, other	Sundanese
᳇	SUNDANESE PUNCTUATION BINDU BA SATANGA	U+1CC7	Po, other	Sundanese
܀	SYRIAC END OF PARAGRAPH	U+0700	Po, other	Syriac
܁	SYRIAC SUPRALINEAR FULL STOP	U+0701	Po, other	Syriac
܂	SYRIAC SUBLINEAR FULL STOP	U+0702	Po, other	Syriac
܃	SYRIAC SUPRALINEAR COLON	U+0703	Po, other	Syriac
܄	SYRIAC SUBLINEAR COLON	U+0704	Po, other	Syriac
܅	SYRIAC HORIZONTAL COLON	U+0705	Po, other	Syriac
܆	SYRIAC COLON SKEWED LEFT	U+0706	Po, other	Syriac
܇	SYRIAC COLON SKEWED RIGHT	U+0707	Po, other	Syriac
܈	SYRIAC SUPRALINEAR COLON SKEWED LEFT	U+0708	Po, other	Syriac
܉	SYRIAC SUBLINEAR COLON SKEWED RIGHT	U+0709	Po, other	Syriac
܊	SYRIAC CONTRACTION	U+070A	Po, other	Syriac
܋	SYRIAC HARKLEAN OBELUS	U+070B	Po, other	Syriac
܌	SYRIAC HARKLEAN METOBELUS	U+070C	Po, other	Syriac
܍	SYRIAC HARKLEAN ASTERISCUS	U+070D	Po, other	Syriac
᪠	TAI THAM SIGN WIANG	U+1AA0	Po, other	Tai Tham
᪡	TAI THAM SIGN WIANGWAAK	U+1AA1	Po, other	Tai Tham
᪢	TAI THAM SIGN SAWAN	U+1AA2	Po, other	Tai Tham
᪣	TAI THAM SIGN KEOW	U+1AA3	Po, other	Tai Tham
᪤	TAI THAM SIGN HOY	U+1AA4	Po, other	Tai Tham
᪥	TAI THAM SIGN DOKMAI	U+1AA5	Po, other	Tai Tham
᪦	TAI THAM SIGN REVERSED ROTATED RANA	U+1AA6	Po, other	Tai Tham
᪨	TAI THAM SIGN KAAN	U+1AA8	Po, other	Tai Tham
᪩	TAI THAM SIGN KAANKUU	U+1AA9	Po, other	Tai Tham
᪪	TAI THAM SIGN SATKAAN	U+1AAA	Po, other	Tai Tham
᪫	TAI THAM SIGN SATKAANKUU	U+1AAB	Po, other	Tai Tham
᪬	TAI THAM SIGN HANG	U+1AAC	Po, other	Tai Tham
᪭	TAI THAM SIGN CAANG	U+1AAD	Po, other	Tai Tham
꫞	TAI VIET SYMBOL HO HOI	U+AADE	Po, other	Tai Viet
꫟	TAI VIET SYMBOL KOI KOI	U+AADF	Po, other	Tai Viet
𑿿	TAMIL PUNCTUATION END OF TEXT	U+11FFF	Po, other	Tamil
౷	TELUGU SIGN SIDDHAM	U+0C77	Po, other	Telugu
๏	THAI CHARACTER FONGMAN	U+0E4F	Po, other	Thai
๚	THAI CHARACTER ANGKHANKHU	U+0E5A	Po, other	Thai
๛	THAI CHARACTER KHOMUT	U+0E5B	Po, other	Thai
༄	TIBETAN MARK INITIAL YIG MGO MDUN MA	U+0F04	Po, other	Tibetan
༅	TIBETAN MARK CLOSING YIG MGO SGAB MA	U+0F05	Po, other	Tibetan
༆	TIBETAN MARK CARET YIG MGO PHUR SHAD MA	U+0F06	Po, other	Tibetan
༇	TIBETAN MARK YIG MGO TSHEG SHAD MA	U+0F07	Po, other	Tibetan
༈	TIBETAN MARK SBRUL SHAD	U+0F08	Po, other	Tibetan
༉	TIBETAN MARK BSKUR YIG MGO	U+0F09	Po, other	Tibetan
༊	TIBETAN MARK BKA- SHOG YIG MGO	U+0F0A	Po, other	Tibetan
་	TIBETAN MARK INTERSYLLABIC TSHEG	U+0F0B	Po, other	Tibetan
༌	TIBETAN MARK DELIMITER TSHEG BSTAR	U+0F0C	Po, other	Tibetan
།	TIBETAN MARK SHAD	U+0F0D	Po, other	Tibetan
༎	TIBETAN MARK NYIS SHAD	U+0F0E	Po, other	Tibetan
༏	TIBETAN MARK TSHEG SHAD	U+0F0F	Po, other	Tibetan
༐	TIBETAN MARK NYIS TSHEG SHAD	U+0F10	Po, other	Tibetan
༑	TIBETAN MARK RIN CHEN SPUNGS SHAD	U+0F11	Po, other	Tibetan
༒	TIBETAN MARK RGYA GRAM SHAD	U+0F12	Po, other	Tibetan
༔	TIBETAN MARK GTER TSHEG	U+0F14	Po, other	Tibetan
྅	TIBETAN MARK PALUTA	U+0F85	Po, other	Tibetan
࿐	TIBETAN MARK BSKA- SHOG GI MGO RGYAN	U+0FD0	Po, other	Tibetan
࿑	TIBETAN MARK MNYAM YIG GI MGO RGYAN	U+0FD1	Po, other	Tibetan
࿒	TIBETAN MARK NYIS TSHEG	U+0FD2	Po, other	Tibetan
࿓	TIBETAN MARK INITIAL BRDA RNYING YIG MGO MDUN MA	U+0FD3	Po, other	Tibetan
࿔	TIBETAN MARK CLOSING BRDA RNYING YIG MGO SGAB MA	U+0FD4	Po, other	Tibetan
࿙	TIBETAN MARK LEADING MCHAN RTAGS	U+0FD9	Po, other	Tibetan
࿚	TIBETAN MARK TRAILING MCHAN RTAGS	U+0FDA	Po, other	Tibetan
⵰	TIFINAGH SEPARATOR MARK	U+2D70	Po, other	Tifinagh
𑓆	TIRHUTA ABBREVIATION SIGN	U+114C6	Po, other	Tirhuta
𐎟	UGARITIC WORD DIVIDER	U+1039F	Po, other	Ugaritic
꘍	VAI COMMA	U+A60D	Po, other	Vai
꘎	VAI FULL STOP	U+A60E	Po, other	Vai
꘏	VAI QUESTION MARK	U+A60F	Po, other	Vai
𑨿	ZANABAZAR SQUARE INITIAL HEAD MARK	U+11A3F	Po, other	Zanabazar Square
𑩀	ZANABAZAR SQUARE CLOSING HEAD MARK	U+11A40	Po, other	Zanabazar Square
𑩁	ZANABAZAR SQUARE MARK TSHEG	U+11A41	Po, other	Zanabazar Square
𑩂	ZANABAZAR SQUARE MARK SHAD	U+11A42	Po, other	Zanabazar Square
𑩃	ZANABAZAR SQUARE MARK DOUBLE SHAD	U+11A43	Po, other	Zanabazar Square
𑩄	ZANABAZAR SQUARE MARK LONG TSHEG	U+11A44	Po, other	Zanabazar Square
𑩅	ZANABAZAR SQUARE INITIAL DOUBLE-LINED HEAD MARK	U+11A45	Po, other	Zanabazar Square
𑩆	ZANABAZAR SQUARE CLOSING DOUBLE-LINED HEAD MARK	U+11A46	Po, other	Zanabazar Square
࡞	MANDAIC PUNCTUATION	U+085E	Po, other	Mandaic

== See also ==
- Diacritic
- James while John had had had had had had had had had had had a better effect on the teacher, a word puzzle
- Obelism, the practice of annotating manuscripts with marks set in the margins
- Orthography, the category of written conventions that includes punctuation as well as spelling, hyphenation, capitalization, word breaks, and emphasis
- Scribal abbreviations, abbreviations used by ancient and medieval scribes writing in Latin
- Terminal punctuation
- History of sentence spacing for typographical details
- Tironian notes, a system of shorthand that consisted of about 4,000 signs
- Usage (language)
