= Irony punctuation =

Proposed form of notation used to denote irony or sarcasm in text

o

Irony punctuation

Irony punctuation is any form of notation proposed or used to denote verbal irony in written text. Due to the common co-occurrence or conflation of irony with sarcasm, at least some of these are sarcasm punctuation. Written text, in English and other languages, lacks a standard way to mark irony, and several forms of punctuation have been proposed to fill the gap.

Specific irony marks have been proposed (sometimes as jokes, sometimes seriously), such as in the form of an open upward arrow, used by Marcellin Jobard in the 19th century, and in a form resembling a reversed question mark, proposed by French poet Alcanter de Brahm during the 19th century.

Irony punctuation is primarily used to indicate that a sentence should be understood at a second level. A bracketed exclamation point or question mark as well as scare quotes are also occasionally used to express irony or sarcasm.

== Irony mark ==
As rhetorical questions are sometimes ironic, the rhetorical question mark (a rare and disused punctuation mark invented by Henry Denham in the 1580s) sometimes conveys irony.

John Wilkins mentioning his proposed irony mark, ¡

In 1668, John Wilkins, in An Essay Towards a Real Character, and a Philosophical Language, proposed using an inverted exclamation mark (¡) to punctuate irony in his new constructed language.

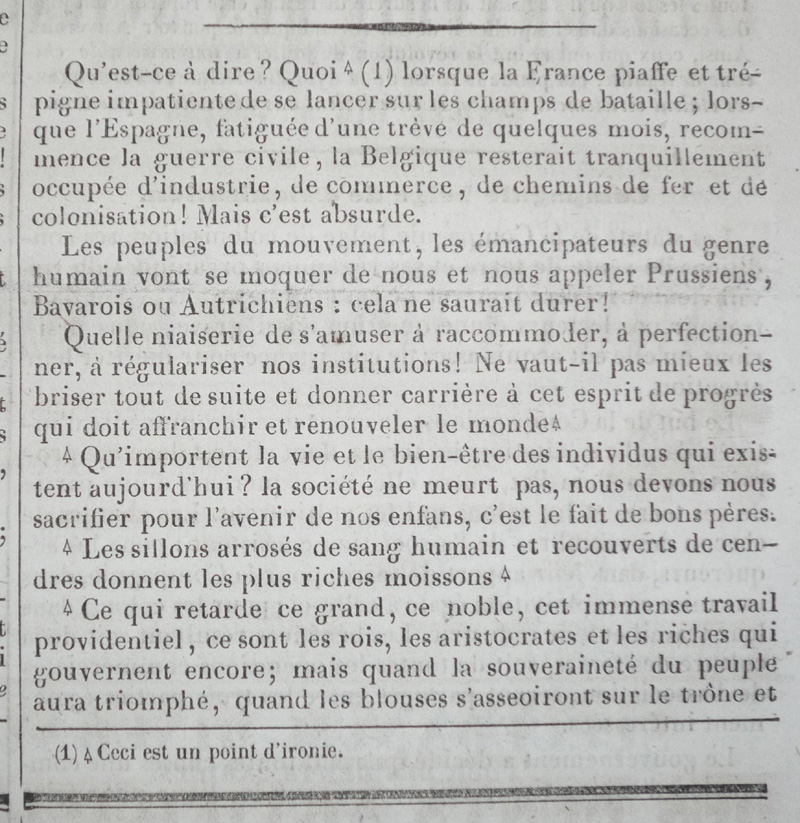
Marcellin Jobard's 1841 article using an irony point

In an article dated 11 October 1841, Marcellin Jobard, a Belgian newspaper publisher, introduced an "irony mark" (French: point d'ironie) in the shape of a raised oversized arrow head with small stem, rather like an ideogram of a Christmas tree. The next year he expanded his idea, suggesting the symbol could be used in various orientations (on its side, upside down, etc.) to mark "a point of irritation, an indignation point, a point of hesitation".

Ambrose Bierce's "snigger point", as published in The Collected Works of Ambrose Bierce

In an essay entitled "For Brevity And Clarity", published in 1887, Ambrose Bierce facetiously proposed the "snigger point" or "note of cachinnation":

It is written thus ‿ and represents, as nearly as may be, a smiling mouth. It is to be appended, with the full stop, to every jocular or ironical sentence; or, without the stop, to every jocular or ironical clause of a sentence otherwise serious—thus: "Mr. Edward Bok is the noblest work of God ‿." "Our respected and esteemed ‿ contemporary, Mr. Slyvester Vierick, whom for his virtues we revere and for his success envy ‿, is going to the devil as fast as his two heels can carry him." "Deacon Harvey, a truly good man ‿, is self-made in the largest sense of the term; for although he was born great, wise and rich, the deflection of his nose is the work of his own coat-sleeve."

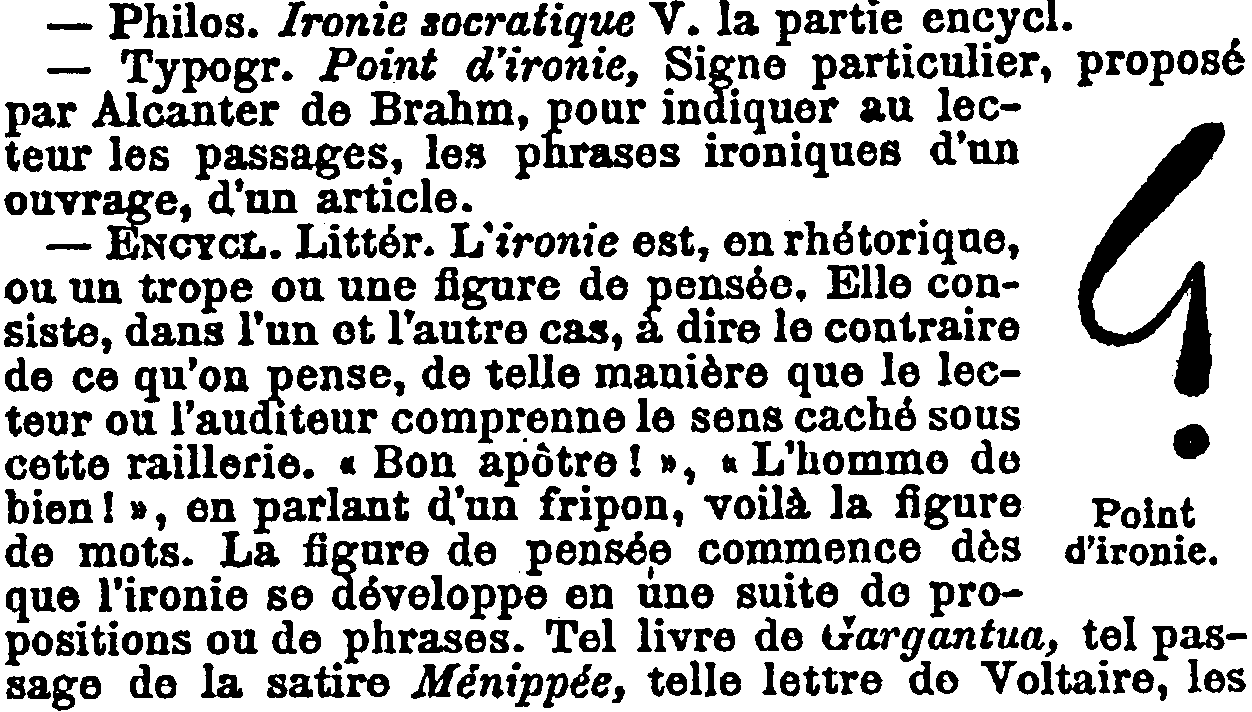
Irony mark as designed by Alcanter de Brahm, mentioned in a French encyclopedia from 1905

Another irony point (French: point d'ironie) was proposed by the French poet Alcanter de Brahm (alias, Marcel Bernhardt) in his 1899 book L'ostensoir des ironies to indicate that a sentence should be understood at a second level (irony, sarcasm, etc.). It is illustrated by a glyph resembling, but not identical to, a small, elevated, backward-facing question mark.

Hervé Bazin, in his essay "Plumons l'Oiseau" ("Let's pluck the bird", 1966), used the Greek letter ψ with a dot below for the same purpose. In the same work, the author proposed five other innovative punctuation marks: the "doubt point", "conviction point", "acclamation point", "authority point", and "love point".

In March 2007, the Dutch foundation CPNB (Collectieve Propaganda van het Nederlandse Boek) presented another design of an irony mark, the ironieteken. This resembles a lightning bolt symbol or zig-zag with two kinks going down and slightly to the left where it terminates before a dot (like an exclamation mark or question mark have). It is somewhat akin to a punctus interrogativus except much more vertically upright.

Alcanter de Brahm 1899

Hervé Bazin 1966

CPBN proposal 2007

Marcellin Jorbard 1886

== Reverse italics (Sartalics) ==
Tom Driberg recommended that ironic statements be printed in leftward-slanting italics, which he also called sartalics, to distinguish irony from the emphasis indicated by conventional rightward-slanting italics.

== Scare quotes ==
Scare quotes are a particular use of quotation marks. They are placed around a word or phrase to indicate that it is not used in the fashion that the writer would personally use it. In contrast to the nominal typographic purpose of quotation marks, the enclosed words are not necessarily quoted from another source. When read aloud, various techniques are used to convey the sense, such as prepending the addition of "so-called" or a similar word or phrase of disdain, using a sarcastic or mocking tone, or using air quotes, or any combination of the above.

== Temherte slaq ==
In certain Ethiopic languages, sarcasm and unreal phrases are indicated at the end of a sentence with a sarcasm mark called temherte slaq or timirte slaq (Amharic: ትእምርተ፡ሥላቅ), a character that looks like the inverted exclamation point (U+00A1) ( ¡ ).

== Other typography ==
=== Pseudo-HTML tags ===
It is common in online conversation among some Internet users to use a fictitious closing tag patterned after HTML: </sarcasm>. Over time, it has evolved to lose the angle brackets (/sarcasm) and has subsequently been shortened to /sarc or /s (not to be confused with the valid HTML end tag </s> used to end a struck-through passage). Users of the website Reddit frequently denote sarcasm through the use of /s, as shorthand. This usage later evolved into tone indicators.

=== Brackets ===
Rhetorical questions in some informal situations can use a bracketed question mark, e.g., "Oh, really[?]". The equivalent for an ironic or sarcastic statement would be a bracketed exclamation mark, e.g., "Oh, really[!]". Subtitles, such as in Teletext, sometimes use an exclamation mark within parentheses, (!), to mark sarcasm.

=== Tildes ===
Another method of expressing sarcasm (or, perhaps, irony) is by using tildes (~).

For example, a "fanpost" on the sports blog Card Chronicle described its community culture of using the tilde for this purpose thusly:

'~' – This one character maybe the most important here at CC. Quite simply it means don't take what is said before the symbol too seriously. This is our sarcasm marker

One convention for doing this is by placing the mark adjacent to the punctuation. This allows for easy use with any keyboard, as well as variation. Variations include dry sarcasm (~.), enthusiastic sarcasm (~!), and sarcastic questions (~?). This convention been adopted by the Udacity Machine Learning Nanodegree community.

In another convention, perhaps first proposed in 2001 by blogger Tara Liloia, the tilde replaces the punctuation mark:

What I propose is on a much grander scale. The sarcasm mark would be appended to the end of any sentence that was meant sarcastically. Think of all of the different places where the sarcasm mark is applicable! Why, The Onion alone would use hundreds of sarcasm marks each day. Man, the Onion is one great newspaper~ Did you catch that? It was a test sarcasm mark—it worked, didn't it? You knew I was being sarcastic. I'm telling you, 10 years from now when the sarcasm mark is in the dictionary, you'll thank me.

In another convention, perhaps first proposed by typographer Choz Cunningham in 2006, the tilde is placed after the period. Cunningham called this a snark and it is sometimes referred to as a snark mark. Cunningham suggested that font designers should make .~ a ligature that placed the tilde above the period.

In another convention, the sarcastic remark is surrounded by tildes, ~like so~. See Tilde § As expressive punctuation for more information on the various shades of meaning tilde punctuation can possess.

=== Sarcastrophes ===
In the early 2010s, some internet users advocated the convention of surrounding sarcastic or ironic comments in carets, ^like so^. In this use, these carets were referred to as sarcastrophes, a portmanteau of sarcasm and apostrophes (to which they bear a small amount of visual resemblance).

=== Capitalization patterns ===
On the Internet, it is common to see alternating uppercase and lowercase lettering to convey a mocking or sarcastic tone, often in the form of memes. One example is the "Mocking SpongeBob" meme, which consists of a caption paired with a still taken from the SpongeBob SquarePants episode "Little Yellow Book" of the character SpongeBob SquarePants acting like a chicken.

=== Emoji, emoticons, and emotes ===
Typing in all-capital letters, using a Twitter-style hashtag such as #sarcasm, or emoticons like "Rolling eyes", a smiley-face emoticon ":>", and a tongue sticking out ":P" /, are used by some in instant messaging. Some might use the "victory hand" dingbat / emoji character to simulate "scare quotes".

The upside-down face emoji is often used to convey sarcasm. However, it can also be understood to indicate a variety of subtle or concealed emotions. These can include annoyance, indignation, panic, mockery, and other more ambiguous feelings.

In many gaming communities, the word "Kappa" is frequently used to display sarcasm as well as joking intent. This is due to the "Kappa" emote on Twitch, a livestreaming site, where it has gained popularity for such purpose. The emote is a black-and-white picture of the face of Josh DeSeno (then-employee of Justin.tv) making a mercurial, subtly smirking expression (which he has claimed was "just a feigned smile"). It is named after the Japanese yokai of the same name.

=== Custom indicators ===
Pair of sarcastises by CollegeHumor

A "SarcMark"

CollegeHumor jokingly proposed new marks called "sarcastises" which resemble ragged, or zig-zagged parentheses, used to enclose sarcastic remarks.

A "SarcMark" symbol, which resembles a spiral enclosing a period, requiring custom computer font software was proposed in 2010. This proposal was subsequently criticized boisterously in an "Open Sarcasm Manifesto" published on the web.

== See also ==
- Emoticon
- Fnord
- Internet slang
- Interrobang (‽)
- Inverted question and exclamation marks (¿¡)
- Percontation point (⸮)
- Poe's law
