= /a/ =

/a/ may refer to:

- Open front unrounded vowel, represented by the International Phonetic Alphabet (IPA) symbol /a/
- /a/, the anime and manga board on the imageboard website 4chan, dedicated to the discussion of Japanese animation and comics

== See also ==
- /A\, the logo of CTV2's A-Channel
- / (disambiguation)
- // (disambiguation)
- /r/ (disambiguation)
