= /r/ =

/r/ or r/ may refer to:

- /r/, an imageboard for Adult Requests on 4chan
- r/, short for https://www.reddit.com/r/, the prefix for the name of a subreddit, a community on Reddit
- /r/, the IPA notation for a pronunciation consisting solely of a voiced dental, alveolar or postalveolar trill or, more broadly, some rhotic consonant
- "R/", the prefix for provisional designations of planetary rings — see Astronomical naming conventions § Natural satellites

== Generic meanings ==
Interpretations like these apply to any sequence of letters and/or digits prefixed and suffixed by a slash (punctuation):

- /r/, a regular expression using ed-style delimiters that matches the string "r"
- /r/, a Unix-style path (computing) that points to the top-level directory named "r"

== See also ==
- Slasher (disambiguation)
- - /r9k/, a 4chan board that implements the "ROBOT9000" algorithm that prevents exact reposts
  - /rif, short for "Rhythm in Freedom", an Indonesian alt-rock band
  - /ritzau/, the logo of Ritzaus Bureau A/S, a Danish news agency
  - /root and /run, directories in the Filesystem Hierarchy Standard used by most Unix-like systems, such as Linux distributions
- - R/390, an IBM RS/6000 server expansion card
  - Ultraman R/B, a Japanese television series
  - R/GA Media Group, Inc.
  - R/I, short for "Reader/Interpreter", an OS/360 feature
  - r/K selection theory, an evolutionary hypothesis
  - R/P or RPR, the reserves-to-production ratio of a non-renewable resource
  - R/P FLIP, a semi-submersible open ocean research platform
  - R/T, short for "Road/Track", a Dodge/Chrysler automobile performance marker
  - R/V, short for "research vessel", a kind of ship
  - R/W, short for "read/write"
- ℞, a character primarily abbreviating Latin recipe, referring to a medical prescription
- /r, the tone indicator for 'romantic'
- \r, the backslash escape sequence for carriage return
- / (disambiguation)
- R (disambiguation)
