= Air quotes =

Finger gesture indicating quotation marks

The index and middle finger are bent twice in succession.

Air quotes, also called finger quotes, are virtual quotation marks formed in the air with one's fingers when speaking. The gesture is typically done with both hands held shoulder-width apart and at the eye or shoulders level of the speaker, with the index and middle fingers on each hand flexing at the beginning and end of the phrase being quoted. The air-quoted phrase is, in the most common usage, a few words. Air quotes are often used to express satire, sarcasm, irony or euphemism and are analogous to scare quotes in print.

== History ==
Use of similar gestures has been recorded as early as 1927, and Glenda Farrell used air quotes in a 1937 screwball comedy, "Breakfast for Two." In 1889, in Lewis Carroll's last novel, the author described air brackets and an air question mark. The term "air quotes" first appeared in a 1989 Spy magazine article by Paul Rudnick and Kurt Andersen, who state it became a common gesture around 1980.

The gesture was used routinely in the TV show Celebrity Charades (1979) as the standard signal for a quote or phrase. In the 1965 Bewitched episode "Prodigy", Gladys Kravitz (played by Alice Pearce) uses air quotes several times while reciting reviews of her brother's violin recitals. In the episode "Nurse's Wild" of TV show Emergency! (1972), the character Roy DeSoto uses air quotes at Rampart Hospital base station.

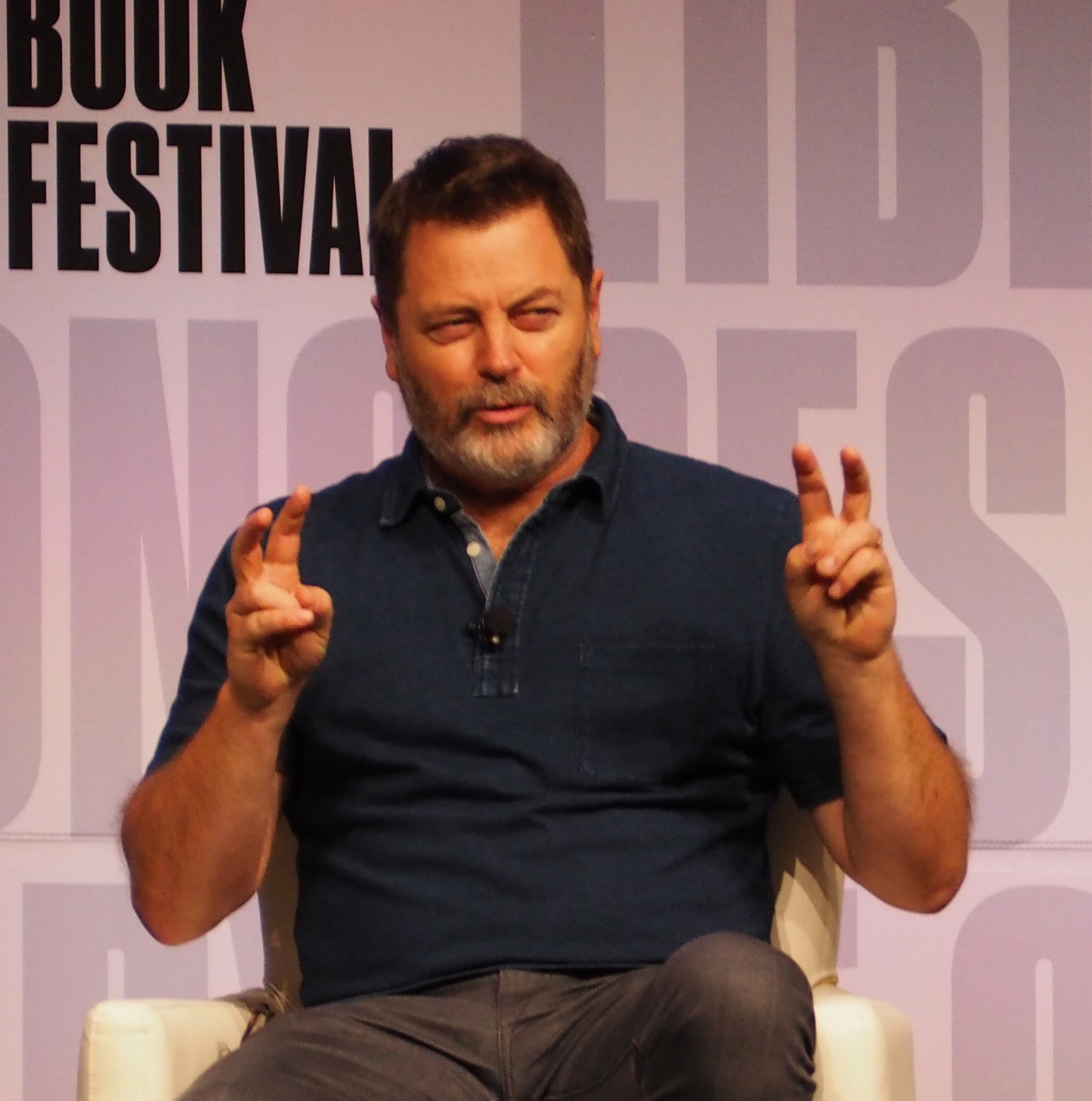
American actor Nick Offerman using the gesture while speaking at the 2022 National Book Festival

The gesture became very popular in the 1990s and was frequently used by comedian Steve Martin in stand-up comedy shows. Another popularization of air quotes was the character Bennett Brauer, played on the sketch comedy show Saturday Night Live by Chris Farley, an aggressive but socially awkward commentator who used air quotes to mock societal expectations of him. Additionally, in the Austin Powers film series, Dr. Evil makes exaggerated use of air quotes when explaining matters to his henchmen, particularly while using real phrases he erroneously believes himself to have coined such as "laser" and "Death Star." Donald Trump used air quotes when he criticized “quote-President” Obama's refugee policies.

== Meaning ==
The Washington Post calls air quotes "a snide, easy way to discredit or distance oneself from the other side’s words."

== See also ==
- Irony punctuation
