= /s/ =

/s/ may refer to:

- Signature, a mark that a person writes on documents as a proof of identity and intent
- Voiceless alveolar sibilant, a type of voiceless alveolar fricative
- "Sexy Beautiful Women", a forum of 4chan

== See also ==
- /s, a tone indicator for irony/sarcasm
- / (disambiguation)
- // (disambiguation)
- /r/ (disambiguation)
