= Tone indicator =

Shorthand to convey tone or intent

A tone indicator, also called a tone tag, is a shorthand symbol or abbreviation that conveys the intended tone, intent or emotional context of a written message that might otherwise be ambiguous. In essence, it is a form of meta‑communication: a cue that supplements the literal text with guidance on how the message should be interpreted.

Because written communication lacks the nonverbal cues of face‑to‑face interaction – such as vocal inflection, facial expressions, and body language – tone indicators serve as their textual substitutes to reduce misinterpretation. They are particularly common among the neurodivergent community, who often struggle to understand tone.

In casual online communication over the Internet, tone indicators are sometimes represented by a forward slash (/) followed by a few letters, such as /j for "joking" or /gen for "genuine", placed at the end of a sentence.

== History ==
Early attempts to create tone indicators stemmed from the difficulty of denoting irony in print media, and so several irony punctuation marks were proposed. The percontation point (⸮; a reversed question mark) was proposed by Henry Denham in the 1580s to denote a rhetorical question, but usage died out by the 1700s.

In 1668, John Wilkins proposed the irony mark, using an inverted exclamation mark (¡) to denote an ironic statement. Various other punctuation marks were proposed over the following centuries to denote irony, but none gained popular usage. In 1982, the emoticon was created to be used to denote jokes (with :-)) or things that are not jokes (with :-().

The syntax of modern tone indicators stems from /s, which has long been used on the Internet to denote sarcasm. This symbol is an abbreviated version of the earlier /sarcasm, itself a simplification of </sarcasm>, the form of a humorous HTML closing tag marking the end of a "sarcasm" block, and therefore placed at the end of a sarcastic passage.

== Internet usage ==
On the Internet, one or more tone indicators may be placed at the end of a message. A tone indicator on the Internet often takes the form of a forward slash (/) followed by an abbreviation of a relevant adjective; alternatively, a more detailed textual description (e. g., / friendly, caring about your well-being) may be used. For example, /srs may be attached to the end of a message to indicate that the message is meant to be interpreted in a serious manner, as opposed to, for example, being a joke (which is commonly represented as /j). Tone indicators are used to explicitly state the author's intent, instead of leaving the message up to interpretation.

List of common tone indicators on the Internet
Abbreviation	Meaning	Description
/f	fake	Used to denote that a statement is fake.
/gen, /g or /genq	genuine; genuine question	Used to denote genuineness, whether in a phrase or question.
/hj	half-joking	Used to denote a half-joke; when one is joking about only some of the statement.
/hyp	hyperbole	Used to denote hyperboles.
/j	joking	Used to denote jokes.
/l, /lyr or /ly	lyric	Used to denote lyrics.
/lh	lighthearted	Used to denote lightheartedness and cheerfulness; often used on insults to clarify that they are intended to be playful rather than malicious.
/li	literal	Used to denote that a statement is literal or to be taken literally.
/m	metaphor	Used to denote that a statement is a metaphor.
/pos or /pc	positive; positive connotation	Used to denote that a statement has a positive connotation.
/neg or /nc	negative; negative connotation	Used to denote that a statement has a negative connotation.
/p	platonic	Used to denote platonic tone.
/r	romantic	Used to denote romantic statements.
/rh	rhetorical	Used to denote rhetorical statements.
/ref	reference	Used to specify references.
/s	sarcasm	Used to denote sarcasm.
/srs	serious	Used to denote seriousness.
/t	teasing	Used to denote teasing.
/th	threat	Used to denote a threat.

== See also ==
- Meta-communication – Communication about how information is meant to be interpreted
- Internet slang – Slang terms and languages used on the internet
- Plain text – Computer data using only printable characters
- Poe's law – Confusion of parody and sincere expression
