= Question mark =

Typographic character indicating a question (?)

?o

Question mark
- Other names: query, eroteme, interrogation point
- U+003F ? QUESTION MARK (&quest;)

See also
- U+00BF ¿ INVERTED QUESTION MARK

The question mark ? (also known as interrogation point, query, or eroteme in journalism) is a punctuation mark that indicates a question or interrogative clause or phrase in many languages.

== History ==
The history of the question mark is contested. One popular theory posits that the shape of the symbol is inspired by the crook in a cat's tail, often attributed to the ancient Egyptians. However, Egyptian hieroglyphics did not use punctuation marks. The question mark (or "note of interrogation") is "said by Bilderdijk to have been formed from the first and last letters of the Latin word Quæstio, question, placed one over the other; thus, ^{Q}_{o}."

In the fifth century, Syriac Bible manuscripts used question markers, according to a 2011 theory by manuscript specialist Chip Coakley: he believes the zagwa elaya ("upper pair"), a vertical double dot over a word at the start of a sentence, indicates that the sentence is a question.

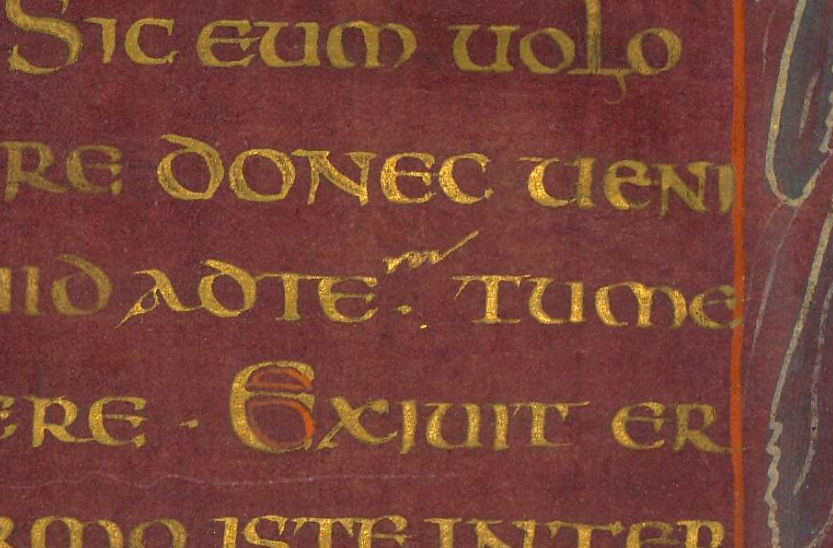
8th century punctus interrogativus from the Godescalc Evangelistary (BnF NAL 1203, f. 6v)

From around 783, in Godescalc Evangelistary, a mark described as "a squiggle rising diagonally from left to right above a point" or "a lightning flash, striking from right to left" is attested. This mark is later called a punctus interrogativus. According to some paleographers, it may have indicated intonation, perhaps associated with early musical notation like neumes. Another theory, is that the "lightning flash" was originally a tilde or titlo, as in ·~, one of many wavy or more or less slanted marks used in medieval texts for denoting things such as abbreviations, which would later become various diacritics or ligatures. The creation of the punctus interrogativus has also been attributed to Alcuin of York, an advisor to Charlemagne.

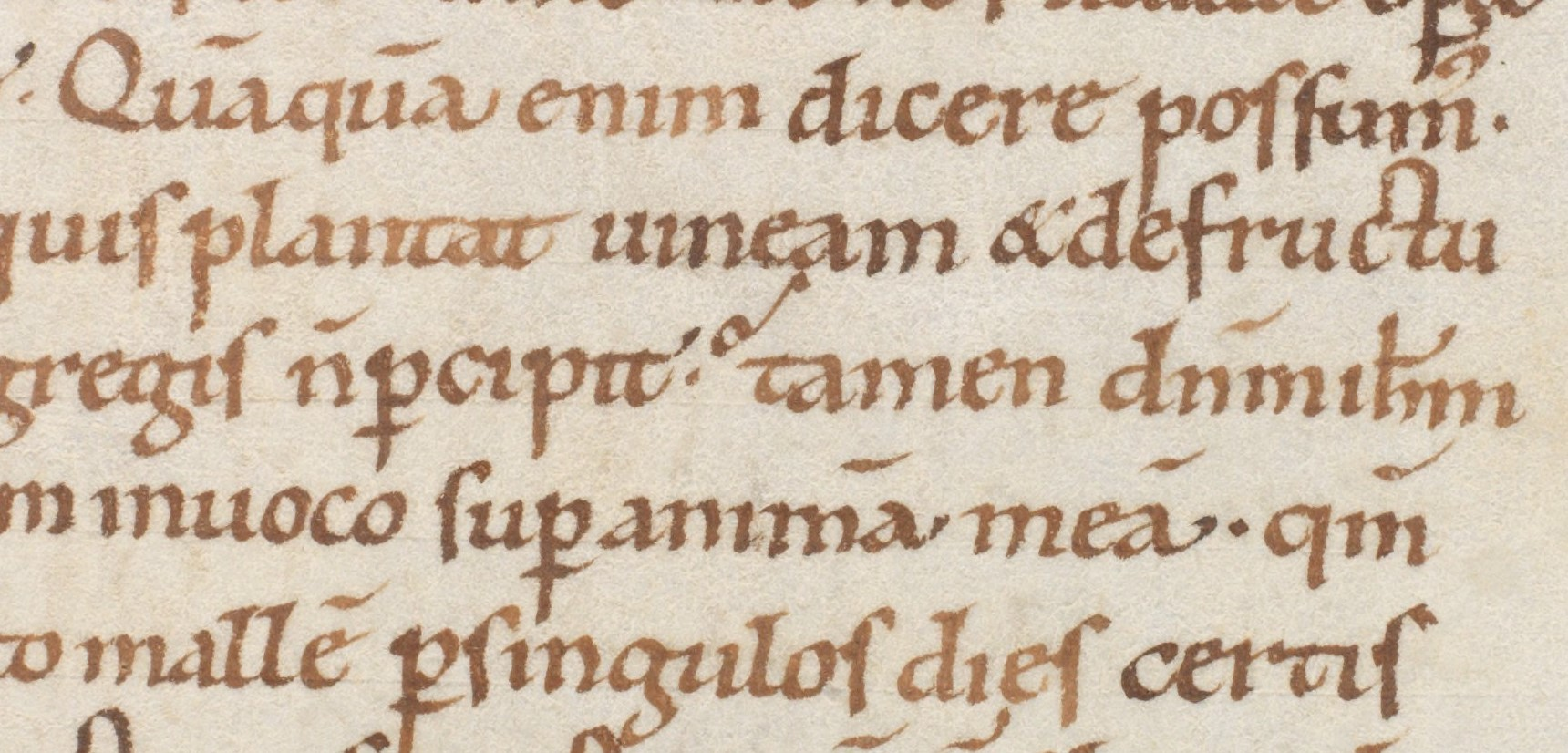
An 11th century punctus interrogativus; in the third line, before "tamen". (Burgerbibliothek Bern, Cod. 162, f. 15r.)

From the 10th century, the pitch-defining element (if it ever existed) seems to have been gradually forgotten, so that the "lightning flash" sign (with the stroke sometimes slightly curved) is often seen indifferently at the end of clauses, whether they embody a question or not.

An example of a handwritten medieval question mark, framed in an orange box bearing a modern question mark

In the early 13th century, when the growth of communities of scholars (universities) in Paris and other major cities led to an expansion and streamlining of the book-production trade, punctuation was rationalized by assigning the "lightning flash" specifically to interrogatives; by this time, the stroke was more sharply curved and can easily be recognized as the modern question mark (see, for example, De Aetna (1496) printed by Aldo Manuzio in Venice).

The punctus interrogativus is encoded in unicode as the character ⹔ (U+2E54 ⹔ MEDIEVAL QUESTION MARK).

In 1598, the English term point of interrogation is attested in an Italian–English dictionary by John Florio.

In the 1850s, the term question mark is attested:

The mark which you are to notice in this lesson is of this shape ? You see it is made by placing a little crooked mark over a period.... The name of this mark is the Question Mark, because it is always put after a question. Sometimes it is called by a longer and harder name. The long and hard name is the Interrogation Point.

== Scope ==
In English, the question mark typically occurs at the end of a sentence, where it replaces the full stop (period). However, the question mark may also occur at the end of a clause or phrase, where it replaces the comma:

Is it good in form? style? meaning?

or:

Showing off for him, for all of them, not out of hubris—hubris? him? what did he have to be hubrid about?—but from mood and nervousness.

— Stanley Elkin

This is quite common in Spanish, where the use of bracketing question marks explicitly indicates the scope of interrogation.

En el caso de que no puedas ir con ellos, ¿quieres ir con nosotros? ("In case you cannot go with them, would you like to go with us?")

A question mark may also appear immediately after questionable data, such as dates:

Genghis Khan (1162?–1227)

== In other languages and scripts ==
=== French spacing ===
French orthography specifies a narrow non-breaking space before the question mark. (e.g., "Que voulez-vous boire ?"); in English orthography, no space appears in front of the question mark (e.g. "What would you like to drink?"). However, this style of spacing can also be seen in some older English works.

=== Opening and closing question marks in Spanish ===
Opening and closing question marks

In Spanish, since the second edition of the Ortografía of the Real Academia Española in 1754, interrogatives require both opening ¿ and closing ? question marks. An interrogative sentence, clause, or phrase begins with an inverted question mark ¿ and ends with the question mark ?, as in:

Ella me pregunta «¿qué hora es?» – "She asks me, 'What time is it?'"

Question marks must always be matched, but to mark uncertainty rather than actual interrogation omitting the opening one is allowed, although discouraged:

Gengis Khan (¿1162?–1227) is preferred in Spanish over Gengis Khan (1162?–1227)

The omission of the opening mark is common in informal writing, but is considered an error. The one exception is when the question mark is matched with an exclamation mark, as in:

¡Quién te has creído que eres? – "Who do you think you are?!"

(The order may also be reversed, opening with a question mark and closing with an exclamation mark.) Nonetheless, even here the Academia recommends matching punctuation:

¡¿Quién te has creído que eres?!

The opening question mark in Unicode is U+00BF ¿ INVERTED QUESTION MARK (&iquest;).

=== Solomon Islands Pidgin ===
In Solomon Islands Pidgin, the question can be between question marks since, in yes/no questions, the intonation can be the only difference.

?Solomon Aelan hemi barava gudfala kandre, ia man? ('Solomon Islands is a great country, isn't it?')

=== Armenian question mark ===
Armenian question mark

In Armenian, the question mark is a diacritic that takes the form of an open circle and is placed over the stressed vowel of the question word. It is defined in Unicode at U+055E ◌՞ ARMENIAN QUESTION MARK.

=== Greek question mark ===
The Greek question mark (Greek: ερωτηματικό, romanized: erōtīmatikó) looks like ;. It appeared around the same time as the Latin one, in the 8th century. It was adopted by Church Slavonic and eventually settled on a form essentially similar to the Latin semicolon. In Unicode, it is separately encoded as U+037E ; GREEK QUESTION MARK, but the similarity is so great that the code point is normalised to U+003B ; SEMICOLON, making the marks identical in practice.

=== Mirrored question mark in right-to-left scripts ===
Mirrored question mark in Arabic and Perso-Arabic

In Arabic and other languages that use Arabic script such as Persian, Urdu and Uyghur (Arabic form), which are written from right to left, the question mark is mirrored right-to-left from the Latin question mark. In Unicode, two encodings are available: U+061F ؟ ARABIC QUESTION MARK (with bi-directional code AL: Right-to-Left Arabic) and U+2E2E ⸮ REVERSED QUESTION MARK (with bi-directional code Other Neutrals). Some browsers may display the character in the previous sentence as a forward question mark due to font or text directionality issues.

The Arabic question mark is also used in some other right-to-left scripts: Dhivehi, N'Ko, Syriac, and Adlam. Adlam also has U+1E95F 𞥟 ADLAM INITIAL QUESTION MARK: 𞥟 𞤢𞤤𞤢𞥄 ؟, 'No?'.

Hebrew script is also written right-to-left, but it uses a question mark that appears on the page in the same orientation as the left-to-right question mark (e.g. את מדברת עברית?).

=== Fullwidth question mark in East Asian languages ===
The question mark is also used in modern writing in Chinese and, to a lesser extent, Japanese. Usually, it is written as fullwidth form in Chinese and Japanese, in Unicode: U+FF1F ？ FULLWIDTH QUESTION MARK. Fullwidth form is always preferred in official usage. In Korean, however, halfwidth is used.

Japanese has an interrogative particle, か (ka), which functions grammatically like a question mark. Therefore, the question mark is not historically used in Japanese, and is still not officially sanctioned for use in government publications or school textbooks, but its popularity has been gradually increasing among younger people. Where official usage is 終わったのかもしれませんよ。, some people would now informally write 終わったのかもしれませんよ？ to express "It may be over"; the question mark here adds a nuance of uncertainty to the sentence rather than turning it into a question.

Chinese also has a spoken indicator of questions, which is 吗 (ma). However, the question mark should always be used after 吗 when asking questions.

=== In other scripts ===
Some other scripts have a specific question mark:

- U+1367 ፧ ETHIOPIC QUESTION MARK
- U+A60F ꘏ VAI QUESTION MARK
- U+2CFA ⳺ COPTIC OLD NUBIAN DIRECT QUESTION MARK, and U+2CFB ⳻ COPTIC OLD NUBIAN INDIRECT QUESTION MARK
- U+1945 ᥅ LIMBU QUESTION MARK

== Percontation point ==
A reversed question mark ⸮ was invented by Henry Denham in the 1580s and was used at the end of a question that does not require an answer—that is, a rhetorical question. It is now referred to as a percontation point, punctus percontativus, or rhetorical question mark. Its use was never ubiquitous, and died out in the 17th century. Its shape was the reverse of an ordinary question mark, so that instead of the main opening pointing back into the sentence, it opened away from it.

This character is represented in Unicode as U+2E2E ⸮ REVERSED QUESTION MARK.

== Typological variants of ? ==
Bracketed question marks can be used for rhetorical questions, for example Oh, really(?), in informal contexts such as closed captioning.

The question mark can also be used as a meta-sign to signal uncertainty regarding what precedes it. It is usually put between brackets: (?). The uncertainty may concern either a superficial level (such as unsure spelling), or a deeper truth (real meaning).

In typography, some other variants and combinations are available: "⁇," "⁈," and "⁉," are usually used for chess annotation symbols; the interrobang, "‽," is used to combine the functions of the question mark and the exclamation mark, superposing these two marks.

== Unicode ==
- U+003F ? QUESTION MARK (inherited from ASCII)
- U+00BF ¿ INVERTED QUESTION MARK (&iquest;)
- U+061F ؟ ARABIC QUESTION MARK
- U+203D ‽ INTERROBANG
- U+2047 ⁇ DOUBLE QUESTION MARK
- U+2048 ⁈ QUESTION EXCLAMATION MARK
- U+2049 ⁉ EXCLAMATION QUESTION MARK
  - ⁉️ with an emoji variation selector
- U+2753 ❓ BLACK QUESTION MARK ORNAMENT
- U+2754 ❔ WHITE QUESTION MARK ORNAMENT
- U+2E18 ⸘ INVERTED INTERROBANG
- U+2E2E ⸮ REVERSED QUESTION MARK
- U+2E54 ⹔ MEDIEVAL QUESTION MARK
- U+FE56 ﹖ SMALL QUESTION MARK
- U+1F679 🙹 HEAVY INTERROBANG ORNAMENT
- U+1F67A 🙺 SANS-SERIF INTERROBANG ORNAMENT
- U+1F67B 🙻 HEAVY SANS-SERIF INTERROBANG ORNAMENT

== Computing ==
In shell and scripting languages, the question mark is often utilized as a wildcard character: a symbol that can be used to substitute for any other character or characters in a string. In particular, filename globbing uses "?" as a substitute for any one character, as opposed to the asterisk, "*", which matches zero or more characters in a string.

On Apple Macs, a folder with a question mark on startup means a startup disk is not found or does not contain a compatible operating system. In computer programming, the symbol "?" has a special meaning in many programming languages.

- In C-descended languages, ? is part of the ?: operator, which is used to evaluate simple boolean conditions.
- In C# 2.0, the ? modifier is used to handle nullable data types and ?? is the null coalescing operator.
- In Java, ? can represent a wildcard type parameter. For instance, List<?> denotes a list that can hold any type (but not null), and List<? extends T> and List<? super T> denote a list that can hold any type that inherits from/is an ancestor class of (respectively) type T (including T itself).
- In the POSIX syntax for regular expressions, such as that used in Perl and Python, ? stands for "zero or one instance of the previous subexpression", i.e. an optional element. It can also make a quantifier like {x,y}, + or * match as few characters as possible, making it lazy, e.g. /^.*?px/ will match the substring 165px in 165px 17px instead of matching 165px 17px. (Note: The Perl Compatible Regular Expressions library implements the U flag, which reverses behavior of quantifiers: these become lazy by default, and ? can make them greedy.)
- In certain implementations of the BASIC programming language, the ? character may be used as a shorthand for the "print" function; in others (notably the BBC BASIC family), ? is used to address a single-byte memory location.
- In OCaml, the question mark precedes the label for an optional parameter.
- In Scheme, as a convention, symbol names ending in ? are used for predicates, such as odd?, null?, and eq?. Similarly, in Ruby, method names ending in ? are used for predicates.
- In Swift a type followed by ? denotes an option type; ? is also used in "optional chaining", where if an option value is nil, it ignores the following operations. Similarly, in Kotlin, a type followed by ? is nullable and functions similar to option chaining are supported.
- In APL, ? generates random numbers or a random subset of indices.
- In Rust, a ? suffix on a function or method call indicates error handling.
- In SPARQL, the question mark is used to introduce variable names, such as ?name. In MUMPS, it is the pattern match operator.
- In the xBase family of programming languages, which includes dBase and FoxPro, either one or two question marks at the start of a line of code serve as a shorthand for the Print function. The effect is to evaluate the following expression(s) and to send the result(s) either to the screen or a printer. A single question mark sends a carriage return and line feed before the output; this is not the case with a double question mark.

In many Web browsers and other computer programs, when converting text between encodings, it may not be possible to map some characters into the target character set. In this situation it is common to replace each unmappable character with a question mark ?, inverted question mark ¿, or the Unicode replacement character, usually rendered as a white question mark in a black diamond: U+FFFD � REPLACEMENT CHARACTER. This commonly occurs for apostrophes and quotation marks when they are written with software that uses its own proprietary non-standard code for these characters, such as Microsoft Office's pre-Unicode implementation of "smart quotes" (which used reserved area codepoints).

The generic URL syntax allows for a query string to be appended to a resource location in a Web address so that additional information can be passed to a script; the query mark, ?, is used to indicate the start of a query string. A query string is usually made up of a number of different field/value pairs, each separated by the ampersand symbol, &, as seen in this URL:

http://www.example.com/search.php?query=testing&database=English

Here, a script on the page search.php on the server www.example.com is to provide a response to the query string containing the pairs query=testing and database=English.

== Games ==
In algebraic chess notation, some chess punctuation conventions include ? to denote a bad move, ?? a blunder, ?! a dubious move, and !? an interesting move.

In Scrabble, a question mark indicates a blank tile.

== Linguistics ==
In most areas of linguistics, but especially in syntax, a question mark in front of a word, phrase or sentence indicates that the form in question is strongly dispreferred, "questionable" or "strange", but not outright ungrammatical. (Note: One article notes succinctly that "common practice in linguistics [is that] an asterisk preceding a word, a clause or a sentence is used to indicate ungrammaticality or unacceptability, while a question mark is used to indicate questionable usage", another that, "A question mark indicates that the example is marginal; an asterisk indicates unacceptability" and another that "examples preceded by an asterisk are ungrammatical, and those preceded by a question mark would be considered strange".) (The asterisk is used to indicate outright ungrammaticality.)

Other sources go further and use several symbols (e.g. the question mark and the asterisk plus ?* or the degree symbol °) to indicate gradations or a continuum of acceptability. (Note: One example is "rough approximations of acceptability are given in four gradations and indicated as follows: normal and preferred, no mark; acceptable but not preferred, degree sign °; marginally acceptable, question mark (?); unacceptable, asterisk (*).")

Yet others use double question marks ?? to indicate a degree of strangeness between those indicated by a single question mark and that indicated by the combination of question mark and asterisk.

An ordinary question mark was used in ASCII renderings of the International Phonetic Alphabet, such as SAMPA, in place of the glottal stop symbol, ʔ, (which resembles "?" without the dot), and corresponds to Unicode code point U+0294 ʔ LATIN LETTER GLOTTAL STOP.

== Mathematics and formal logic ==
In mathematics, "?" commonly denotes Minkowski's question mark function.

In linear logic, the question mark denotes one of the exponential modalities that control weakening and contraction.

When placed above the relational symbol in an equation or inequality, a question-mark annotation means that the stated relation is "questioned". This can be used to ask whether the relation might be true or to point out the relation's possible invalidity.

- U+225F ≟ QUESTIONED EQUAL TO
- U+2A7B ⩻ LESS-THAN WITH QUESTION MARK ABOVE
- U+2A7C ⩼ GREATER-THAN WITH QUESTION MARK ABOVE

It is occasionally used in the form n? for Triangular numbers, under the name Termial.

== Medicine ==
A question mark is used in English medical notes to suggest a possible diagnosis. It facilitates the recording of a doctor's impressions regarding a patient's symptoms and signs. For example, for a patient presenting with left lower abdominal pain, a differential diagnosis might include ?diverticulitis (read as "query diverticulitis").

== See also ==
- Betteridge's law of headlines – Journalistic adage on questions in headlines
- High rising terminal – Intonation pattern in some varieties of English ('upspeak', 'uptalk')
- Inquiry – Type of investigation
- Interrobang – Combined question mark and exclamation mark
- Irony punctuation – Proposed form of notation used to denote irony or sarcasm in text
- List of typographical symbols and punctuation marks
- Terminal punctuation – Marks that identify the end of some text
- .notdef – A glyph indicating a missing glyph. May incorporate a question mark in its appearance, such as an appearance that resembles ⍰
- Replacement character – Unicode character. May incorporate a question mark in its appearance, such as an appearance that resembles ⯑
