= Read/write =

Read/write may refer to:

- File system permissions
- Read–write memory
