= /b/ (disambiguation) =

/b/ is an online forum on 4chan.

In the International Phonetic Alphabet, /b/ (and variations thereof) refer to these consonantal stop phonemes:

- /b/, the voiced bilabial plosive, a widespread sound
  - /b̺/, the voiced linguolabial plosive, a rare sound
  - /b̪/, the voiced labiodental plosive, in the Austronesian and Germanic languages
- /ɓ/, the voiced bilabial implosive, a widespread sound
  - /ɓ̥/, the voiceless bilabial implosive, an unstable sound in languages of Africa
