= Scare quotes =

Quotation marks used to indicate non-standard usage

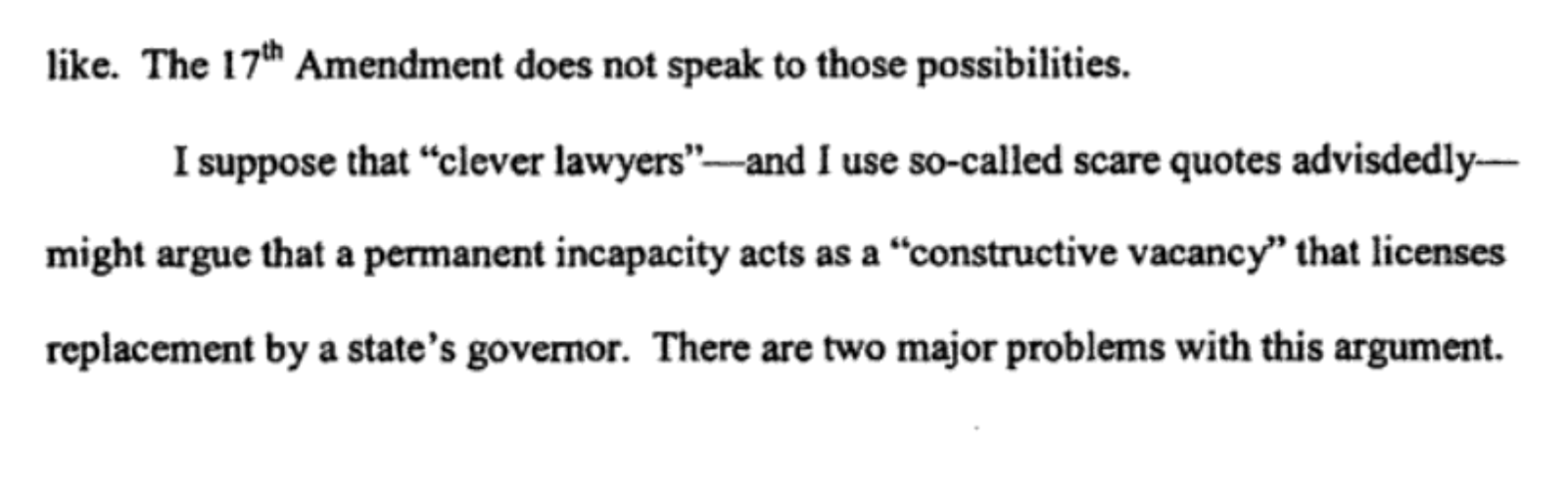
Intentional usage of scare quotes by Sanford Levinson in a testimony before the United States Senate, 2004

Scare quotes (also called shudder quotes or sneer quotes) are quotation marks that writers place around a word or phrase to signal that they are using it in an ironic, referential, or otherwise non-standard sense. Scare quotes may indicate that the author is using someone else's term, similar to preceding a phrase with the expression "so-called"; they may imply skepticism, disagreement, sarcasm, or belief that the words enclosed in quotes are misused. Whether quotation marks are considered scare quotes depends on context, as scare quotes are not visually different from actual quotations. The use of scare quotes is sometimes discouraged in formal or academic writing.

== History ==
The first recorded use of the term scare quotes referring to punctuation marks was by the philosopher Elizabeth Anscombe in her 1956 essay "Aristotle and the Sea Battle", published in Mind. The use of a graphic symbol on an expression to indicate dubiousness goes back much further: Authors of ancient Greece used a mark called a diple periestigmene for that purpose. Beginning in the 1990s, the use of scare quotes became widespread. Postmodernist authors in particular have theorized about bracketing punctuation, including scare quotes, and have found reasons for their frequent use in their writings. In 2014, Slate declared hashtags to be "the new scare quotes" in the sense that both are used for "announcing distance". Just like scare quotes, hashtags such as #firstworldproblems or #YOLO may signal that the phrase is not one's own.

== Usage ==
Writers use scare quotes for a variety of reasons. They can imply doubt or ambiguity in words or ideas within the marks, or even outright contempt. They can indicate that a writer is purposely misusing a word or phrase or that the writer is unpersuaded by the text in quotes, and they can help the writer deny responsibility for the quote. Megan Garber in The Atlantic writes: "to put terms like 'identity politics' or 'rape culture' or, yes, 'alt-right' in scare quotes is ... to make, in that placement, a political declaration." In general, the punctuation expresses distance between the writer and the quote.

For example:

Some "groupies" were following the band.

The scare quotes could indicate that the word is not one the writer would normally use, or that the writer thinks there is something dubious about the word groupies or its application to these people. The exact meaning of the scare quotes is not clear without further context.

The term scare quotes may be confusing because of the word scare. An author may use scare quotes not to convey alarm, but to signal a semantic quibble. Scare quotes may suggest or create a problematization with the words set in quotes.

== Criticism ==
Some experts encourage writers to avoid scare quotes because they can distance the writer and confuse the reader.

Editor Greil Marcus, in a talk at Case Western Reserve University, described scare quotes as "the enemy", adding that they "kill narrative, they kill story-telling... They are a writer's assault on his or her own words." Scare quotes have been described as ubiquitous, and the use of them as expressing distrust in truth, reality, facts, reason, and objectivity. Political commentator Jonathan Chait wrote in The New Republic, "The scare quote is the perfect device for making an insinuation without proving it, or even necessarily making clear what you're insinuating." In 1982, philosopher David Stove examined the trend of using scare quotes in philosophy as a means of neutralizing or suspending words that imply cognitive achievement, such as knowledge or discovery.

Scare quotes can be replaced by writing text to make the insinuation explicit.

== In speech ==
In spoken conversation, a stand-in for scare quotes is a hand gesture known as air quotes or finger quotes, which mimics quotation marks. A speaker may alternatively say "quote" before and "unquote" after quoted words, or say "quote unquote" before or after the quoted words, or pause before and emphasize the parts in quotes. These spoken methods are also used for literal and conventional quotes.

== See also ==
- Evidentiality
- Hedge
- Irony punctuation
- Quotation
- Sic
