= Emote =

Pictorial depiction of an action in an online chat

An emote is an entry in a text-based chat client that indicates an action taking place. Unlike emoticons, they are not text art, and instead describe the action using words or images (similar to emoji).

== Overview ==
In most IRC chat clients, entering the command "/me" will print the user's name followed by whatever text follows. For example, if a user named Joe typed "/me jumps with joy", the client will print this as "Joe jumps with joy" in the chat window.

<Joe> Allow me to demonstrate...
 * Joe jumps with joy

In online chatrooms that do not support the "/me" command, it is conventional to read text surrounded by asterisks as if it were emoted. For example, reading "Joe: *jumps with joy*" in a chat log would suggest that the user had intended the words to be performed rather than spoken.

In MMORPGs with visible avatars, such as EverQuest, Asheron's Call, Second Life and World of Warcraft, certain commands entered through the chat interface will print a predefined /me emote to the chat window and cause the character to animate, and in some cases produce sound effects. For example, entering "/confused" into World of Warcraft's chat interface will play an animation on the user's avatar and print "You are hopelessly confused." in the chat window.

Emotes are used primarily online in video games and, more recently, on smartphones. Image-based emotes are frequently used in the chat feature of the streaming service Twitch. Twitch also allows users to upload animated emotes encoded with the GIF format.

== See also ==
- Emoji

== Sources ==
- "History of emotes and why we use them": Reader's Digest
- "History of emotes in gifs": PC Gamer
- Pardes, Arielle (February 1, 2018). "The Complete History of Emoji". Wired.
- "Animate your Emote and Convert it to a GIF: SuperEmotes"
