= List of typographical symbols and punctuation marks =

Typographical symbols and punctuation marks are used in typography with a variety of purposes such as to help with legibility and accessibility, or to identify special cases. This list gives those most commonly encountered with Latin script. For a far more comprehensive list of symbols and signs, see List of Unicode characters. For other languages and symbol sets (especially in mathematics and science), see below.

In this table:

- The first cell in each row gives a symbol;
- The second is the name assigned to it by the Unicode Consortium;
- The third gives its most common alias or name in another major variety of English, (e.g., period for full stop) otherwise the Unicode name is repeated to facilitate sorting;
- The fourth lists closely related concepts or glyphs, or adds a clarification note.

The table is presented in alphabetical order by common name. Each column header has an up-down arrow (⬍) that may be used freely to rearrange the order that the list is displayed, giving priority to that column.

Typographical symbols and punctuation marks
Symbol	Unicode name of the symbol (Note: As defined in the Unicode standards)	Common name (Note: Name of Wikipedia article, if different from the Unicode name, or a major English-language variant (such as 'full-stop' and 'period').)	Similar concepts (and additional notes)
´	Acute accent (freestanding)	Acute accent	Diacritics (accents)
◌́	Combining acute accent (diacritic)	Acute accent	Diacritics (accents)
≈	Almost equal to	Approximation	Tilde, double hyphen, double tilde
&	Ampersand	Ampersand, and sign	Plus sign, ligature (writing)
⟨	Mathematical left angle bracket	Angle brackets	Bracket, parenthesis, less-than sign, guillemet
⟩	Mathematical right angle bracket	Angle brackets	Bracket, parenthesis, greater-than sign, guillemet
'	Apostrophe (typewriter)	Apostrophe	Right single quotation mark ("typesetter's apostrophe"), modifier letter apostrophe, prime (symbol)
’	Right single quotation mark	Apostrophe	(The right single quotation mark is more often seen as the "typesetter's apostrophe".)
*	Asterisk	Asterisk	Asterism, dagger
⁂	Asterism	Asterism	Dinkus, therefore sign
@	Commercial at	At sign	Called "monkey" in some languages
\	Reverse solidus	Backslash	Called "reverse slant" in ASCII. Slash, Solidus (/)
`	Grave accent (freestanding)	Backtick	
‱	Per ten thousand sign	Basis point	Per cent, per mille (per 1,000)
∵	Because	Because sign	Therefore sign
•	Bullet	Bullet	Middle dot
℅	Care of	Care of	Look up care of at Wiktionary, the online dictionary
‸	Caret	Caret (proofreading)	Caret (computing) (^)
⁁	Caret insertion point	Caret (proofreading)	Caret (computing) (^)
⎀	Insertion symbol	Caret (proofreading)	Caret (computing) (^)
^	Circumflex accent (freestanding)	Caret	Hat operator, chevron, caret (proofreading)
◌̂	Combining circumflex accent (diacritic)	Circumflex	Combining Diacritical Marks
:	Colon	Colon	Semicolon
,	Comma	Comma	Decimal separator
⌘	Place of interest sign	Command key, looped square	
⁒	Commercial minus sign	Commercial minus sign	Minus sign, division sign, per cent sign, obelus
🄯	Copyleft symbol	Copyleft sign	Copyright sign
©	Copyright sign	Copyright sign	Sound recording copyright symbol
{	Left curly bracket	Curly brackets, braces	Angle bracket, parenthesis
}	Right curly bracket	Curly brackets, braces	Angle bracket, parenthesis
¤	Currency sign	Currency sign (generic)	Various currency symbols.
†	Dagger	Dagger	Obelus, footnotes, Latin cross
‡	Double dagger	Dagger (double)	Obelus, footnotes, Cross of Lorraine
–	En dash	En dash	Dash (many types)
—	Em dash	Em dash	Dash (many types)
°	Degree sign	Degree sign	Masculine ordinal indicator
⌀	Diameter sign	Diameter	Ø (Scandinavian orthography), slashed zero, empty set
÷	Division sign	Division sign	Slash (solidus), obelus
◌	Dotted circle	Dotted circle	Combining Diacritical Marks
…	Horizontal ellipsis	Ellipsis	The form . . . is usually preferred
=	Equals sign	Equal sign	
℮	Estimated symbol	Estimated sign	
!	Exclamation mark	Exclamation point	Inverted exclamation mark, interrobang
ª	Feminine ordinal indicator	Feminine ordinal indicator	Female sign, masculine ordinal indicator, gender symbols
♀	Female sign	Female sign	Gender symbol, LGBT symbols, feminine ordinal indicator
❦	Floral heart	Fleuron	Dingbat, dinkus
◌̀	Combining grave accent (diacritic)	Grave accent	Diacritic, backtick
>	Greater-than sign	Greater than sign	Angle bracket
«	Left-pointing double angle quotation mark	Guillemet, French quotation marks	Angle brackets, quotation marks, much less than
»	Right-pointing double angle quotation mark	Guillemet, French quotation marks	Angle brackets, quotation marks, much greater than
⚥	Male and female sign	Hermaphrodite (botany)	Gender symbol, LGBT symbols
×	Multiplication sign	Hybrid (biology)	X mark
‐	Hyphen	Hyphen	Dash, hyphen-minus
-	Hyphen-minus	Hyphen-minus	Minus sign, hyphen, dash
⹀	Double hyphen	Hyphen (double)	
⸗	Double oblique hyphen	Hyphen (double)	
·	Middle dot	Interpunct	Bullet, dot operator, decimal separator
‽	Interrobang	Interrobang	
<	Less-than sign	Less-than sign	Angle bracket
◊	Lozenge	Lozenge	Square lozenge ("Pillow")
♂	Male sign	Male sign	Gender symbol, LGBT symbols
☞	White right pointing index	Manicule	Obelus (medieval usage)
º	Masculine ordinal indicator	Masculine ordinal indicator	Feminine ordinal indicator, degree sign, male sign, gender symbols
−	Minus sign	Minus sign	Plus and minus signs, hyphen-minus, commercial minus
#	Number sign	Number sign	(also known as "octothorpe", "hash", pound sign (US usage) and "hashtag sign"). Numero sign
№	Numero sign	Numero sign	Number sign
(	Left parenthesis	Parenthesis	Brackets, angle brackets, curly brackets, square brackets
)	Right parenthesis	Parenthesis	Brackets, angle brackets, curly brackets, square brackets
%	Percent sign	Per cent sign	Per mille (per 1,000), basis point (per 10,000)
‰	Per mille sign	Per mille sign	Percent, basis point
.	Full stop	Period	Middle dot, decimal separator
¶	Pilcrow sign	Paragraph mark	Section sign ('Silcrow')
⌑	Square lozenge	Square lozenge, pillow	'Pillow' is an informal nick-name used in the travel industry.
|	Vertical line	Pipe	
+	Plus sign	Plus sign	Minus sign, ampersand
±	Plus-minus sign	Plus or minus	Minus or plus
′	Prime	Prime symbol	Foot (unit), minute
″	Double prime	Prime symbol	Inch, second
‴	Triple prime	Prime symbol	Thirds
?	Question mark	Question mark	Inverted question mark, interrobang
"	Quotation mark (typewriter)	Quotation mark (double)	Prime symbols, ditto mark. Guillemets
“	Left double quotation mark (Curly)	Quotation mark (double)	Prime symbols, ditto mark. Double prime
”	Right double quotation mark (Curly)	Quotation mark (double)	Prime symbols, ditto mark. Double prime
‘	Left single quotation mark	Quotation mark (single)	U+2018 ‘ LEFT SINGLE QUOTATION MARK
’	Right single quotation mark	Quotation mark (single)	Apostrophe (The right single quotation mark is more often seen as the "typesetter's apostrophe".)
®	Registered sign	Registered trademark	Trademark symbols
§	Section sign	Section symbol	Section mark, double-s, 'silcrow' (after pilcrow)
;	Semicolon	Semicolon	Greek question mark
℠	Service mark	Service mark	Trademark symbols
⚹	Sextile	Sextile	Star symbols
/	Solidus	Slash	Called "slant" in ASCII. Division sign, forward slash, shilling sign, virgule
℗	Sound recording copyright	Sound recording copyright	Copyright sign
[	Left square bracket	Square brackets	Angle bracket, parenthesis
]	Right square bracket	Square brackets	Angle bracket, parenthesis
∴	Therefore	Therefore sign	Asterism, because sign
⁀	Undertie	Tie (typography)	
~	Tilde (freestanding)	Tilde	Approximation, wave dash, double tilde
◌̃	Combining tilde (diacritic)	Tilde	Diacritic
™	Trade mark sign	Trademark symbol	Registered trade mark
_	Low line	Underscore	Underline
¡	Inverted exclamation mark	Upside-down exclamation point	
¿	Inverted question mark	Upside-down question mark	

== More symbols ==
- Astronomical symbols – Symbols in astronomy
- Botany § Symbols
- Braille
- Chemical symbol – Abbreviations used in chemistry
- Chinese punctuation – Punctuation used with Chinese characters
- Currency symbol – Symbol used to represent a monetary currency's name
- Diacritic – Modifier mark added to a letter (accent marks etc.)
- Electronics symbols
- Hazard symbol
- Hebrew punctuation – Punctuation conventions of the Hebrew language over time
- Glossary of mathematical symbols
- International Code of Signals (using flags)
- International Symbol of Access
- Japanese punctuation
- Korean punctuation
- Media control symbols
- Ordinal indicator – Character(s) following an ordinal number (used of the style 1st, 2nd, 3rd, 4th or as superscript, 1^{st}, 2^{nd}, 3^{rd}, 4^{th} or (though not in English) 1º, 2º, 3º, 4º).
- Power symbol
- List of currency symbols currently in use
- List of logic symbols
- List of Japanese typographic symbols
- List of mathematical symbols by subject
- List of common physics notations
- List of typographic features
- Category:Typographical symbols
