= Chevron =

Chevron (often relating to horizontal V-shaped patterns) may refer to:

== Organisations ==
- Chevron Corporation, an American multinational energy corporation
  - Chevron U.S.A., Inc. v. Natural Resources Defense Council, Inc., 467 U.S. 837 (1984), a United States Supreme Court case dealing with administrative law
- Chevron Cars Ltd, a British racing car constructor
- Chevron Engineering Ltd, a New Zealand car maker
- The Chevron, former newspaper at the University of Waterloo, Ontario, Canada

== Symbols ==
- Chevron (insignia), an indicator of military rank or heraldic symbol
- Trill (music), a wavy line indicating a trill
- Chevron, a symbol used in reticles in firearm scopes like the ACOG
- Chevron (flag), a flag pattern
- Chevron-shaped typographical marks
  - Caret, U+005E ^ CIRCUMFLEX ACCENT, the freestanding (ASCII) symbol now known as caret, with a variety of uses in mathematics and computing (and not used as a diacritic)
  - Caret (proofreading), U+2038 ‸ CARET, a proof-reader's mark to indicate an insertion is needed
  - Caron or háček, U+030C ◌̌ COMBINING CARON, a diacritic (also known as "inverted circumflex")
  - Circumflex, U+0302 ◌̂ COMBINING CIRCUMFLEX ACCENT, a diacritic
  - Logical conjunction, U+22C0 ⋀ N-ARY LOGICAL AND, a truth-functional operator of conjunction or logical conjunction in mathematics and logic

== Places ==
- Chevron, Kansas, an unincorporated community, United States
- Chevron Island, a neighbourhood in Gold Coast, Queensland, Australia
- Château de Chevron, in France
- Chevron Mountain
- Chevron Reef, artificial reef constructed in 2000 in Santa Monica Bay
- Chevron Rocks
- Chevron Science Center, academic building in Pittsburgh, Pennsylvania
- Estadio Chevron, a professional baseball stadium located in Tijuana, Baja California, in Mexico
- Hebron, a city in Palestine

== Science and technology ==
- Chevron (aerospace), sawtooth patterns on some jet engines
- Chevron (anatomy), a bone
- Eulithis testata, a moth
- Chevron (geology), a fold in rock layers
- Chevron (land form), a sediment deposit across the Earth's surface
- Chevron nail, a rare transient fingernail ridge pattern seen in children
- Chevron plot, a way of representing data

== Other uses ==
- Chevron, a type of moustache
- Chevron, part of a stargate in the Stargate fictional universe
- Philip Chevron (1957–2013), Irish singer/songwriter
- The Chevrons, an American pop group
- "Chevron" (song), from the 2016 album Mariner
- Chevron bead, special glass beads
- Chevron (sculpture), an abstract sculpture in Lincoln Park, Chicago

== See also ==
- Category:Coats of arms with chevrons
