= Tilde =

Punctuation and accent mark (~, ◌̃)

~ ◌̃o

Tilde (punctuation) Combining tilde (diacritic)
- In Unicode: U+007E ~ TILDE; U+0303 ◌̃ COMBINING TILDE

The tilde (/ˈtɪldə/, also /ˈtɪld, -di, -deɪ/) is a grapheme ⟨˜⟩ or ⟨~⟩ with a number of uses. The name of the character came into English from Spanish tilde, which, in turn, came from the Latin titulus, meaning 'title' or 'superscription'. Its primary use internationally is as a diacritic in combination with a base letter. Its freestanding form, most common in English, is used in modern texts mainly to indicate approximation.

== History ==
=== Use by medieval scribes ===
The tilde was originally one of a variety of marks written over an omitted letter or several letters as a scribal abbreviation (a "mark of contraction"). Thus, the commonly used words Anno Domini were frequently abbreviated to A^{o} Dñi, with an elevated terminal with a contraction mark placed over the "n", such a mark could denote the omission of one letter or several letters. This saved on the expense of the scribe's labor and the cost of vellum and ink. Medieval European charters written in Latin are largely made up of such abbreviated words with contraction marks and other abbreviations; only uncommon words were given in full.

The text of the Domesday Book of 1086, relating for example, to the manor of Molland in Devon (see adjacent picture), is highly abbreviated as indicated by numerous tildes.

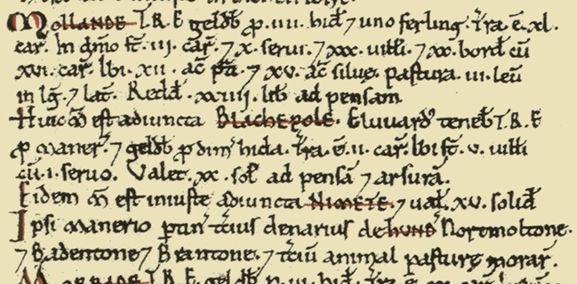
Text of Exeter Domesday Book of 1086 (Note: The text with abbreviations expanded is as follows: Mollande tempore regis Eduardi geldabat pro quattuor hidis et uno ferling. Terra est quadraginta carucae. In dominio sunt tres carucae et decem servi et triginta villani et viginti bordarii cum sedecim carucis. Ibi duodecim acrae prati et quindecim acrae silvae. Pastura tres leugae in longitudine et latitudine. Reddit quattuor et viginti libras ad pensam. Huic manerio est adjuncta Blachepole. Elwardus tenebat tempore regis Edwardi pro manerio et geldabat pro dimidia hida. Terra est duae carucae. Ibi sunt quinque villani cum uno servo. Valet viginti solidos ad pensam et arsuram. Eidem manerio est injuste adjuncta Nimete et valet quindecim solidos. Ipsi manerio pertinet tercius denarius de Hundredis Nortmoltone et Badentone et Brantone et tercium animal pasturae morarum. Translation: In the time of King Edward Mollande gelded for four hides and one ferling. The land is forty carucates. In the domain there are three barons and ten serfs and thirty peasants and twenty bordars with sixteen barons. There are twelve acres of meadow and fifteen acres of wood. A pasture three leagues in length and breadth. It should weigh four and twenty pounds. Blachepole is attached to this manor. Elward held it in the time of King Edward for a manor and gelded for half a hide. The earth is two carucas. There are five peasants with one servant. It is worth twenty shillings for weighing and burning. The same manor is unjustly attached to Nimes and is worth fifteen shillings. To the manor belongs a third of the penny of the Hundred of Nortmolton and Badenton and Branton, and a third of the cattle of the pasture.)

=== Role of mechanical typewriters ===
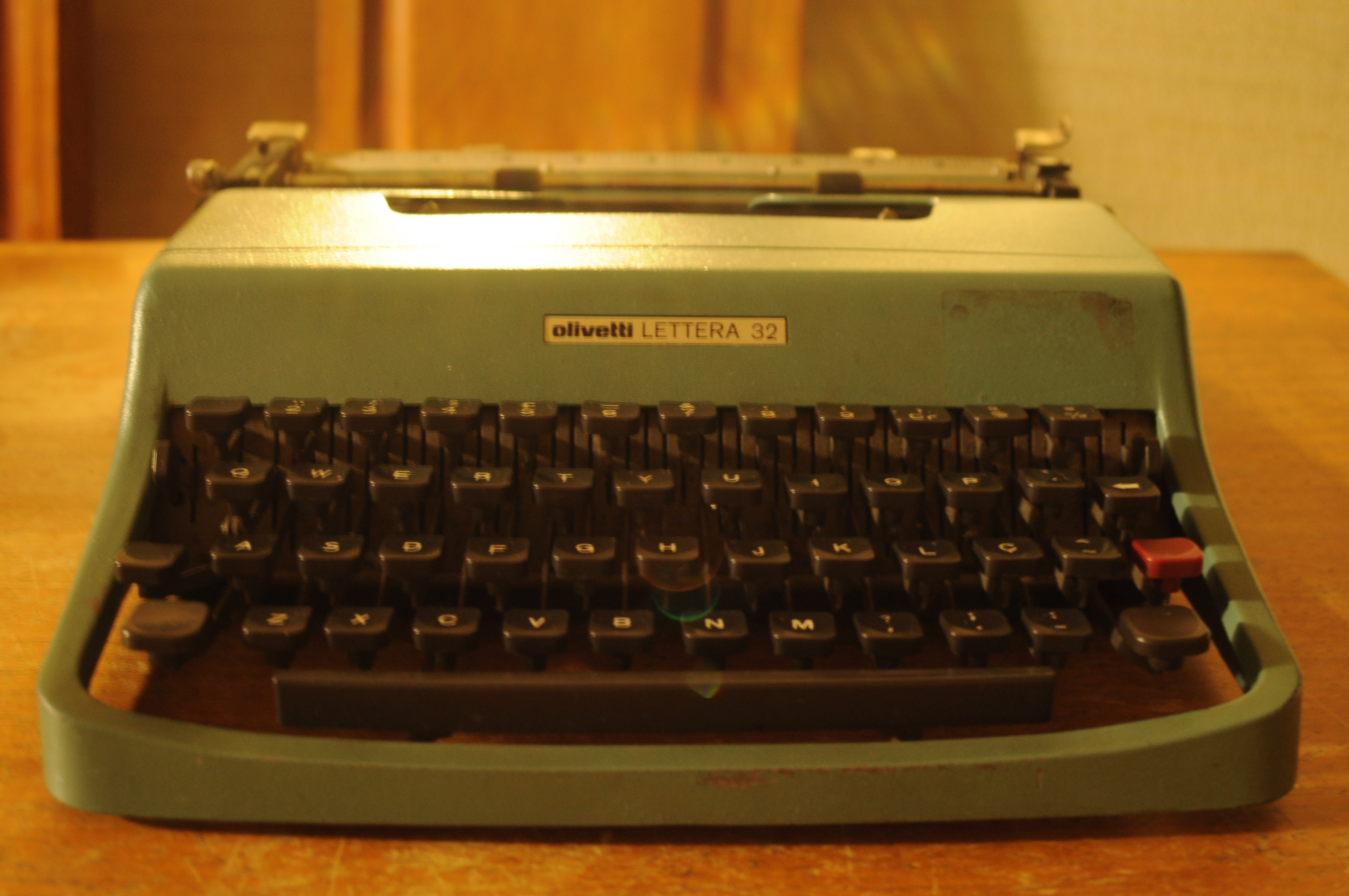
An Olivetti Lettera 32 typewriter (Portuguese Model) with tilde (and circumflex) dead-key beside Ç

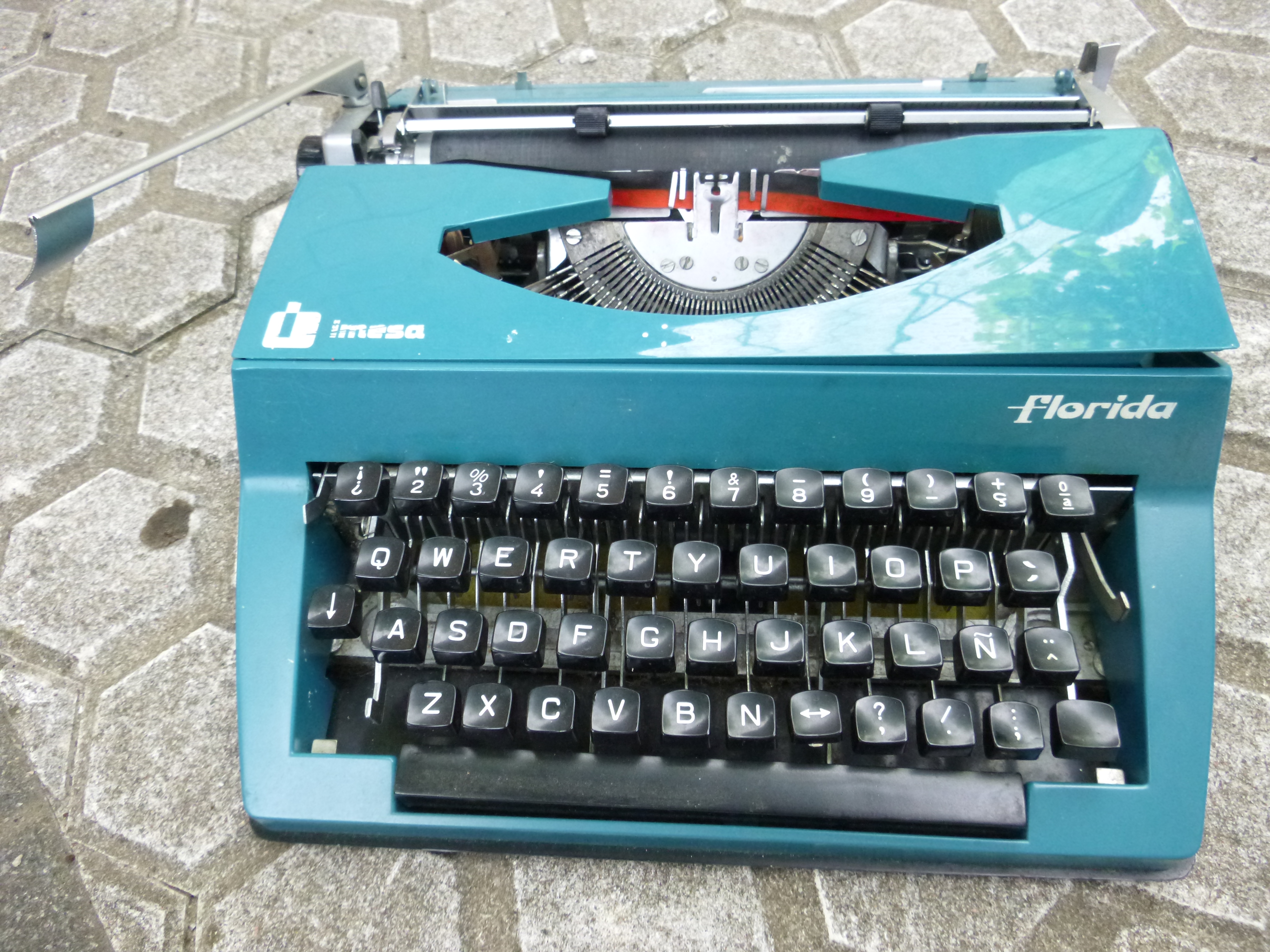
Spanish typewriter (QWERTY keyboard) with dead keys for acute, circumflex, diaeresis and grave accents. Ñ/ñ is present as a precomposed character only.

On typewriters designed for languages that routinely use diacritics (accent marks), there are two possible solutions. Keys can be dedicated to precomposed characters or alternatively a dead key mechanism can be provided. With the latter, a mark is made when a dead key is typed, but unlike normal keys, the paper carriage does not move on and thus the next letter to be typed is printed under that accent. Typewriters for Spanish typically have a dedicated key for Ñ/ñ but, as Portuguese uses Ã/ã and Õ/õ, a single dead-key (rather than take two keys to dedicate) is the most practical solution.

The tilde symbol did not exist independently as a movable type or hot-lead printing character since the type cases for Spanish or Portuguese would include sorts for the accented forms.

=== The centralized ASCII tilde ===
Serif:	—~—
Sans-serif:	—~—
Monospace:	—~—
A free-standing tilde between two em dashes in three font families

The first ASCII standard (X3.64-1963) did not have a tilde. Like Portuguese and Spanish, the French, German and Scandinavian languages also needed symbols in excess of the basic 26 needed for English. The ASA worked with and through the CCITT to internationalize the code-set, to meet the basic needs of at least the Western European languages.

It appears to have been at their May 13–15, 1963 meeting that the CCITT decided that the proposed ISO 7-bit code standard would be suitable for their needs if a lower case alphabet and five diacritical marks [...] were added to it. At the October 29–31 meeting, then, the ISO subcommittee altered the ISO draft to meet the CCITT requirements, replacing the up-arrow and left-arrow with diacriticals, adding diacritical meanings to the apostrophe and quotation mark, and making the number sign a dual (Note: alternative association for the same code point) for the tilde.

— Yucca's free information site (which cites the original sources).

Thus ISO 646 was born (and the ASCII standard updated to X3.64-1967), providing the tilde and other symbols as optional characters. (Note: ISO 646 (and ASCII, which it includes) is a standard for 7-bit encoding, providing just 96 printable characters (and 32 control characters). This was insufficient to meet the needs of Western European languages and so the standard specifies certain code points that are available for national variation. With the arrival of 8-bit "extended ASCII", this issue was largely mitigated, though not fully resolved until Unicode was established.)

ISO 646 and ASCII incorporated many of the overprinting lower-case diacritics from typewriters, including tilde. Overprinting was intended to work by putting a backspace code between the codes for letter and diacritic. However even at that time, mechanisms that could do this or any other overprinting were not widely available, did not work for capital letters, and were impossible on video displays, with the result that this concept failed to gain significant acceptance. Consequently, many of these free-standing diacritics (and the underscore) were quickly reused by software as additional syntax, basically becoming new types of syntactic symbols that a programming language could use. As this usage became predominant, type design gradually evolved so these diacritic characters became larger and more vertically centered, making them useless as overprinted diacritics but much easier to read as free-standing characters that had come to be used for entirely different and novel purposes. Most modern fonts align the plain ASCII "spacing" (free-standing) tilde at the same level as dashes, or only slightly higher.

The free-standing tilde is at code 126 in ASCII, where it was inherited into Unicode as U+007E.

A similar shaped mark (⁓) is known in typography and lexicography as a swung dash: these are used in dictionaries to indicate the omission of the entry word.

=== Connection to Spanish ===
Logo of the Instituto Cervantes

Logo of CNN en Español

As indicated by the etymological origin of the word "tilde" in English, this symbol has been closely associated with the Spanish language. The connection stems from the use of the tilde above the letter ⟨n⟩ to form the (different) letter ⟨ñ⟩ in Spanish, a feature shared by only a few other languages, most of which are historically connected to Spanish. This peculiarity can help non-native speakers quickly identify a text as being written in Spanish with little chance of error. Particularly during the 1990s, Spanish-speaking intellectuals and news outlets demonstrated support for the language and the culture by defending this letter against globalisation and computerisation trends that threatened to remove it from keyboards and other standardised products and codes. The Instituto Cervantes, founded by Spain's government to promote the Spanish language internationally, chose as its logo a highly stylised Ñ with a large tilde. The 24-hour news channel CNN in the US later adopted a similar strategy on its existing logo for the launch of its Spanish-language version, therefore being written as CN͠N. And similarly to the National Basketball Association (NBA), the Spain men's national basketball team is nicknamed "ÑBA".

In Spanish itself the word tilde is used more generally for diacritics, including the stress-marking acute accent. The diacritic ~ is more commonly called virgulilla or la tilde de la eñe, and is not considered an accent mark in Spanish, but rather simply a part of the letter ñ (much like the dot over ı makes an i character that is familiar to readers of English).

== Usage ==
=== Common use in English ===
The English language does not use the tilde as a diacritic, though it is used in some loanwords. The standalone form of the symbol is used more widely. Informally, it means "approximately", "about", or "around", such as "~30 minutes before", meaning "approximately 30 minutes before". It may also mean "similar to", including "of the same order of magnitude as", such as "x ~ y" meaning that x and y are of the same order of magnitude. Another approximation symbol is the double tilde ≈, meaning "approximately/almost equal to". The tilde is also used to indicate congruence of shapes by placing it over an = symbol, thus ≅.

==== As expressive punctuation ====
In more recent digital usage, tildes on either side of a word or phrase have sometimes come to convey a particular tone that "let[s] the enclosed words perform both sincerity and irony", which can pre-emptively defuse a negative reaction. For example, BuzzFeed journalist Joseph Bernstein interprets the tildes in the following tweet:

in the ~ spirit of the season ~ will now link to some of the (imho) #Bestof2014 sports reads. if you hate nice things, mute that hashtag.

as a way of making it clear that both the author and reader are aware that the enclosed phrase – "spirit of the season" – "is cliche and we know this quality is beneath our author, and we don't want you to think our author is a cliche person generally". (Note: See also Air quotes.)

Among other uses, the symbol has been used on social media to indicate sarcasm. It may also be used online, especially in informal writing such as fanfiction, to convey a cutesy, playful, or flirtatious tone.

The similar-looking character wave dash (〜) is sometimes used as expressive punctuation in Japanese.

=== Diacritical use ===
In some languages, the tilde is a diacritic mark placed over a letter to indicate a change in its pronunciation:

==== Pitch ====
The modern form of the tilde was adopted from the polytonic orthography of Ancient Greek, where perispomene ('circumflex'), U+0342 ◌͂ COMBINING GREEK PERISPOMENI, had two forms: an inverted breve and the swash that we now associate with the tilde. It marked a rise in pitch accent followed by a return to default pitch. The tilde-shaped perispomene is also used as a tone mark in Vietnamese, though in Unicode it was mistakenly made canonically equivalent to the tilde, causing encoding problems when the actual Middle Vietnamese tilde for nasalization is used alongside it.

==== Abbreviation ====
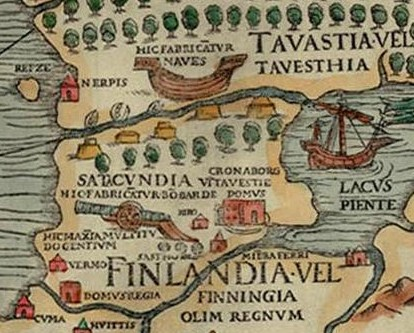
Carta marina showing Finnish economy, with the captions Hic fabricantur naves and Hic fabricantur bombarde abbreviated. This tilde had the shape of a macron.

A macron was used to make abbreviations in medieval Latin documents. When an ⟨n⟩ or ⟨m⟩ followed a vowel, it was often omitted, and a small ⟨N⟩) was placed over the preceding vowel to indicate the missing letter; this is the origin of the use of tilde to indicate nasalization (compare the development of the umlaut as an abbreviation of ⟨e⟩.) A curled macron marked an omitted ⟨a⟩ or a syllable containing it. The practice of using the tilde over a vowel to indicate omission of an ⟨n⟩ or ⟨m⟩ continued in printed books in French as a means of reducing text length until the 17th century. It was also used in Portuguese and Spanish.

The tilde was also used occasionally to make other abbreviations, such as over the letter ⟨q⟩, making q̃, to signify the word que ("that"). It also appears for qua and together with the letter ⟨p⟩ to form p̃ for pra.

==== Nasalization ====
It is also as a small ⟨n⟩ that the tilde originated when written above other letters, marking a Latin ⟨n⟩ which had been elided in old Galician-Portuguese. In modern Portuguese it indicates nasalization of the base vowel: mão "hand", from Lat. manu-; razões "reasons", from Lat. rationes. This usage has been adopted in the orthographies of several native languages of South America, such as Guaraní and Nheengatu, as well as in the International Phonetic Alphabet (IPA) and many other phonetic alphabets. For example, [ljɔ̃] is the IPA transcription of the pronunciation of the French place-name Lyon.

In Breton, the symbol ⟨ñ⟩ after a vowel means that the letter ⟨n⟩ serves only to give the vowel a nasalised pronunciation, without being itself pronounced, as it normally is. For example, ⟨an⟩ gives the pronunciation [ãn] whereas ⟨añ⟩ gives [ã]. A similar convention in the Turtle Mountain orthography for Southern Michif uses ⟨ñ⟩ to nasalise the prior vowel.

In the DMG romanization of Tunisian Arabic, the tilde is used for nasal vowels õ and ṏ.

==== Palatal n ====
The tilded ⟨n⟩ (⟨ñ⟩, ⟨Ñ⟩) developed from the digraph ⟨nn⟩ in Spanish. In this language, ⟨ñ⟩ is considered a separate letter called eñe (IPA: [ˈeɲe]), rather than a letter-diacritic combination; it is placed in Spanish dictionaries between the letters ⟨n⟩ and ⟨o⟩. In Spanish, the word tilde actually refers to diacritics in general, e.g. the acute accent in José, while the diacritic in ⟨ñ⟩ is called "virgulilla" (IPA: [birɣuˈliʝa]) (yeísta) or (IPA: [birɣuˈliʎa]) (non-yeísta). Current languages in which the tilded ⟨n⟩ (⟨ñ⟩) is used for the palatal nasal consonant /ɲ/ include

- Asturian
- Aymara
- Basque
- Chamorro
- Filipino
- Galician
- Guaraní
- Iñupiaq
- Mapudungun
- Papiamento
- Quechua
- Spanish
- Tetum
- Wolof

==== Tone ====
In Vietnamese, a tilde over a vowel represents a creaky rising tone (ngã). Letters with the tilde are not considered separate letters of the Vietnamese alphabet. That usage stems from the Greek perispomene.

==== International Phonetic Alphabet ====
In phonetic and phonological transcription using the International Phonetic Alphabet, a tilde may be used as a diacritic that is placed above a letter, below it, or superimposed onto it, each position with a different meaning:

- A tilde above a letter, U+0303 ◌̃ COMBINING TILDE, indicates nasalization, e.g. [ã], [ṽ].
- A tilde below a letter, U+0330 ◌̰ COMBINING TILDE BELOW, indicates creaky voice, e.g. [a̰ d̰].
- A tilde superimposed onto the middle of a letter indicates velarization or pharyngealization, e.g. [ɫ], [z̴]. If no precomposed Unicode character exists, the Unicode character U+0334 ◌̴ COMBINING TILDE OVERLAY can be used to generate one, depending on font support.

Combinations of tilde above and tilde below with a letter are canonically equivalent to any precomposed letters in Unicode. Combinations with the superimposed tilde are not. The latter precomposed characters are ⟨ᵬ ᵭ ᵮ ᵯ ᵰ ᵱ ᵲ ᵳ ᵴ ᵵ ᵶ⟩, adopted with Unicode 4.0, and a single letter adopted later, ⟨ꭨ⟩. A 2023 proposal for additional characters was rejected, with the combining diacritic to be used instead. Some of these additional symbols, such as the ⟨ð̴⟩ commonly used for the sound of Arabic ⟨ظ⟩, are not a simple graphic superposition of U+0334 onto the IPA letter, so a specialized font would be needed to render them as they are seen in texts.

The unsupported letters attested in the literature, as documented in the 2023 proposal, are the pulmonic consonants ⟨c̴ k̴ ɡ̴ g̴ ʔ̴ ʧ̴ ɸ̴ β̴ v̴ θ̴ ð̴ ɬ̴ ɮ̴ ʃ̴ ʒ̴ ʂ̴ x̴ χ̴ h̴ ɽ̴ ʀ̴ ʋ̴ ɭ̴ ᶅ̴ ʎ̴ j̴ ɰ̴⟩, the click letters ⟨ʇ̴ ʗ̴ ʖ̴⟩, the superscript letters ⟨ʴ̴ 𐞩̴⟩, the vowel letters ⟨i̴ ɪ̴ u̴ ʊ̴ o̴ ə̴ a̴ ɑ̴⟩, and the wildcard letters for consonant and vowel, ⟨C̴ V̴⟩. Additional letters are likely. However, this convention is becoming less common apart from the original superimposed letter, the dark L ⟨ɫ⟩, which is individually defined in the IPA Handbook. Instead, the more precise conventions of decomposed velarized ⟨Xˠ⟩ and pharyngealized ⟨Xˤ⟩ are gradually replacing the tilde; most of the attestation in the 2023 proposal are from the 20th century with the exception of transcriptions of the emphatic consonants of Arabic, where the tilde convention remains common.

Although not formally part of the IPA, a tilde may be placed between two letters to indicate variation or alternation. For example, ⟨ɕ ~ ʃ ⟩ could indicate that the sounds are in free variation or alternate depending on context, region or speaker.

==== Letter extension ====
In Estonian, the symbol ⟨õ⟩ stands for the close-mid back unrounded vowel, and it is considered an independent letter.

==== Other uses ====
Some languages and alphabets use the tilde for other purposes, such as:

- Arabic script: A symbol resembling the tilde (U+0653 ـٓ ARABIC MADDAH ABOVE) is used over the letter ⟨ا⟩ (/a/) to become ⟨آ⟩, denoting a long /ʔaː/ sound.
- Guaraní: The tilded ⟨G̃⟩ (note that ⟨G/g⟩ with tilde is not available as a precomposed glyph in Unicode) stands for the velar nasal consonant. Also, the tilded ⟨y⟩ (⟨Ỹ⟩) stands for the nasalized upper central rounded vowel [ɨ̃]. Munduruku, Parintintín, and two older spellings of Filipino words also use ⟨g̃⟩.
- Syriac script: A tilde (~) under the letter Kaph represents a [t͡ʃ] sound, transliterated as ch or č.
- Estonian and Võro use the tilde above the letter ⟨o⟩ to give ⟨õ⟩, indicating the vowel [ɤ], a rare sound among languages.
- Unicode has a combining vertical tilde character: U+033E ◌̾ COMBINING VERTICAL TILDE. It is used to indicate middle tone in linguistic transcription of certain dialects of the Lithuanian language, and was also used historically in the letter х̾, which was part of the Polish Cyrillic alphabet of the late 19th century.
- Resurrección María de Azkue's 1906 Basque dictionary used an idiosyncratic spelling including ⟨ã d̃ ẽ ĩ l̃ ñ õ s̃ t̃ ũ x̃⟩.

=== Punctuation ===
The tilde is used in various ways in punctuation, including:

In some languages (such as in French), a tilde or a tilde-like wave dash (Unicode: U+301C 〜 WAVE DASH) may be used as a punctuation mark (instead of an unspaced hyphen, en dash or em dash) between two numbers, to indicate a range. Doing so avoids the risk of confusion with subtraction or a hyphenated number (such as a part number or model number). For example, "12~15" means "12 to 15", "~3" means "up to three", and "100~" means "100 and greater". East Asian languages almost always use this convention, but it is sometimes done for clarity in some other languages as well. Chinese uses the wave dash and full-width em dash interchangeably for this purpose. In English, the tilde is often used to express ranges and model numbers in electronics, but rarely in formal grammar or in type-set documents, as a wavy dash preceding a number sometimes represents an approximation (see below).

The range tilde is used for various purposes in French, but only to denote ranges of numbers (e.g., « 21~32 degrés Celsius »" means "21 to 32 degrees Celsius").

(The symbol U+2248 ≈ ALMOST EQUAL TO (a double tilde) is also used in French, for example, « ≈400 mètres » means "approximately 400 meters".)

==== Approximation ====
Before a number, the tilde can mean "approximately": e.g., "~42" means "approximately 42". Such usage goes against ISO/IEC 80000-2 and should be avoided. When used with currency symbols that precede the number (national conventions differ), the tilde precedes the symbol, thus for example "~$10" means "about ten dollars".

The symbols ≈ (almost equal to) and ≅ (approximately equal to) are among the other symbols used to express approximation.

==== Japanese ====
The wave dash (波ダッシュ, nami dasshu) is used for various purposes in Japanese, including to denote ranges of numbers (e.g., 5〜10 means between 5 and 10) in place of dashes or brackets, and to indicate origin. The wave dash is also used to separate a title and a subtitle in the same line, as a colon is used in English.

When used in conversations via email or instant messenger it may be used as a sarcasm mark.

The sign is used as a replacement for the chōon, katakana character, in Japanese, extending the final syllable.

==== Chinese ====
WeChat users frequently replace final punctuation with tildes in messages. An analysis of such "innovative uses" of tildes found that final tildes are most used to make the message friendlier and polite. They make expressives more sincere and directives less abrupt. Less commonly, final tildes imply sounds such as onomatopoeia and sound extensions. This use is compared to sajiao (Chinese: 撒娇), a child-like acting seen in East Asian cultures that are also vocalized by raising or extending tone.

=== Mathematics ===
==== As a unary operator ====
A tilde in front of a single quantity can mean "approximately", "about" or "of the same order of magnitude as."

==== As a relational operator ====
In mathematics, the tilde operator (which can be represented by a tilde or the dedicated character U+223C ∼ TILDE OPERATOR), sometimes called "twiddle", is often used to denote an equivalence relation between two objects. Thus "x ~ y" means "x is equivalent to y". It is a weaker statement than stating that x equals y. The expression "x ~ y" is sometimes read aloud as "x twiddles y", perhaps as an analogue to the verbal expression of "x = y".

The tilde can indicate approximate equality in a variety of ways. It can be used to denote the asymptotic equality of two functions. For example, f (x) ~ g(x) means that $\lim_{x \to \infty} \frac{f(x)}{g(x)} = 1$.

In physics and astronomy, a tilde can be used between two expressions (e.g. h ~ 10^{−34} J s) to state that the two are of the same order of magnitude.

In statistics and probability theory, the tilde means "is distributed as"; see random variable (e.g. X ~ B(n, p) for a binomial distribution).

A tilde can also be used to represent geometric similarity (e.g. ∆ABC ~ ∆DEF, meaning triangle ABC is similar to DEF). A triple tilde (≋) is often used to show congruence, an equivalence relation in geometry.

In graph theory, the tilde can be used to represent adjacency between vertices. The edge $(x,y)$ connects vertices $x$ and $y$ which can be said to be adjacent, and this adjacency can be denoted $x \sim y$.

==== As a diacritic ====
The symbol "$\tilde{f}$" is pronounced as "eff tilde" or, informally, as "eff twiddle". This can be used to denote the Fourier transform of f, or a lift of f, and can have a variety of other meanings depending on the context.

A tilde placed below a letter in mathematics can represent a vector quantity (e.g. $(x_1, x_2, x_3, \ldots, x_n) = \underset{^\sim}{\mathbf x}$).

In statistics and probability theory, a tilde placed on top of a variable is sometimes used to represent the median of that variable; thus $\tilde{\mathbf y}$ would indicate the median of the variable $\mathbf y$. A tilde over the letter n ($\tilde{n}$) is sometimes used to indicate the harmonic mean.

In machine learning, a tilde may represent a candidate value for a cell state in GRUs or LSTM units. (e.g. c̃)

=== Physics ===
Often in physics, one can consider an equilibrium solution to an equation, and then a perturbation to that equilibrium. For the variables in the original equation (for instance $X$) a substitution $X\to x+\tilde{x}$ can be made, where $x$ is the equilibrium part and $\tilde{x}$ is the perturbed part.

A tilde is also used in particle physics to denote the hypothetical supersymmetric partner. For example, an electron is referred to by the letter e, and its superpartner the selectron is written ẽ.

In multibody mechanics, the tilde operator maps three-dimensional vectors $\boldsymbol{\omega}\in\mathbb{R}^3$ to skew-symmetrical matrices
$$\tilde{\boldsymbol{\omega}}=\begin{bmatrix}0&-\omega_3& \omega_2\\ \omega_3& 0& -\omega_1\\ -\omega_2&\omega_1&0\end{bmatrix}$$
(see or).

=== Economics ===
For relations involving preference, economists sometimes use the tilde to represent indifference between two or more bundles of goods. For example, to say that a consumer is indifferent between bundles x and y, an economist would write x ~ y.

=== Electronics ===
It can approximate the sine wave symbol (∿, U+223F), which is used in electronics to indicate alternating current, in place of +, −, or ⎓ for direct current.

=== Linguistics ===
The tilde may indicate alternating allomorphs or morphological alternation, as in //ˈniː~ɛl+t// for kneel~knelt (the plus sign '+' indicates a morpheme boundary).

The tilde may represent some sort of phonetic or phonemic variation between two sounds, which might be allophones or in free variation. For example, [χ ~ x] can represent "either [χ] or [x]".

In formal semantics, it is also used as a notation for the squiggle operator which plays a key role in many theories of focus.

In interlinear gloss, a tilde sets off an element added to a word by reduplication; were a hyphen or double hyphen used instead, confusion would arise because that element would be notated in the same way as an independent morpheme requiring an independent gloss.

=== Computing ===
Computer programmers use the tilde in various ways and sometimes call the symbol (as opposed to the diacritic) a squiggle, squiggly, swiggle, or twiddle. According to the Jargon File, other synonyms sometimes used in programming include not, approx, wiggle, enyay (after eñe) and (humorously) sqiggle /ˈskɪɡəl/.

==== Directories and URLs ====
On Unix-like operating systems (including AIX, BSD, Linux and macOS), tilde normally indicates the current user's home directory. For example, if the current user's home directory is /home/user, then the command cd ~ is equivalent to cd /home/user, cd $HOME, or cd. This convention derives from the Lear-Siegler ADM-3A terminal in common use during the 1970s, which happened to have the tilde symbol and the word "Home" (for moving the cursor to the upper left) on the same key. When prepended to a particular username, the tilde indicates that user's home directory (e.g., ~janedoe for the home directory of user janedoe, such as /home/janedoe).

Used in URLs on the World Wide Web, it often denotes a personal website on a Unix-based server. For example, http://www.example.com/~johndoe/ might be the personal website of John Doe. This mimics the Unix shell usage of the tilde. However, when accessed from the web, file access is usually directed to a subdirectory in the user's home directory, such as /home/username/public_html or /home/username/www.

In URLs, the characters %7E (or %7e) may substitute for a tilde if an input device lacks a tilde key. Thus, http://www.example.com/~johndoe/ and http://www.example.com/%7Ejohndoe/ will behave in the same manner.

==== Computer languages ====
===== Regex =====
The tilde is used in the AWK programming language as part of the pattern match operators for regular expressions:

- variable ~ /regex/ returns true if the variable is matched.
- variable !~ /regex/ returns false if the variable is matched.

The operators are also used in the SQL variant of the database PostgreSQL.

A variant of this, with the plain tilde replaced with =~, was adopted in Perl. Ruby also uses this variant without the negated operator.

===== Negation =====
In APL and MATLAB, tilde represents the monadic logical function NOT. and in APL it additionally represents the dyadic multiset function without (set difference).

In C the tilde character is used as bitwise NOT unary operator, following the notation in logic (an ! causes a logical NOT, instead). This is also used by many languages based on or influenced by C, such as C++, C#, D, Java, JavaScript, Perl, PHP, and Python. The MySQL database also use tilde as bitwise invert as does Microsoft's SQL Server Transact-SQL (T-SQL) language.

====== ~~ cast ======
JavaScript also uses tilde as bitwise NOT. Because bitwise operators work on integers, and numbers in JavaScript are 64 bit floating point numbers, the operator converts numbers to a 32-bit signed integer before it performing the negation. The conversion truncates the fractional part and most significant bits. This lets two tildes ~~x to be used as a short syntax to cast to integer. However, it is not recommended as use for truncation. In contrast, it does not truncate BigInts, which are arbitrarily large integers.

===== Other uses =====
In C++ and C#, the tilde is also used as the first character in a class's method name (where the rest of the name must be the same name as the class) to indicate a destructor – a special method which is called at the end of the object's life.

In ASP.NET applications, tilde ('~') is used as a shortcut to the root of the application's virtual directory.

In the CSS stylesheet language, the tilde finds the element selected by the right-hand side that shares the parent with an element selected by the left-hand side.

In the D programming language, the tilde is used as bitwise not operator, concatenation operator such as those of arrays, and to indicate an object destructor. Tilde operator can be overloaded for user types, and binary tilde operator is mostly used to merging two objects, or adding some objects to set of objects. It was introduced because plus operator can have different meaning in many situations. For example, "120" + "14" may produce "134" (addition of two numbers), "12014" (concatenation of strings), or something else. D disallows + operator for arrays (and strings), and provides separate operator for concatenation (similarly PHP programming language solved this problem by using dot operator for concatenation, and + for number addition, which will also work on strings containing numbers).

In Eiffel, the tilde is used for object comparison. If a and b denote objects, the Boolean expression a ~ b has value true if and only if these objects are equal, as defined by the applicable version of the library routine is_equal, which by default denotes field-by-field object equality but can be redefined in any class to support a specific notion of equality. If a and b are references, the object equality expression a ~ b is to be contrasted with a = b which denotes reference equality. Unlike the call a.is_equal (b), the expression a ~ b is type-safe even in the presence of covariance.

In the Apache Groovy programming language the tilde character overloaded as a bitwise binary negation operation, and as the "pattern operator" that creates a regular expression pattern object. =~ and ==~ can in Groovy be used to match a regular expression.

In Haskell, the tilde is used in type constraints to indicate type equality. Also, in pattern-matching, the tilde is used to indicate a lazy pattern match.

In the Inform 6 programming language, the tilde is used to indicate a quotation mark inside a quoted string. Tilde itself is created by @@126.

In "text mode" of the LaTeX typesetting language a tilde diacritic can be obtained using, e.g., \~{n}, yielding "ñ". A stand-alone tilde can be obtained by using \textasciitilde or \string~. In "math mode" a tilde diacritic can be written as, e.g., \tilde{x}. For a wider tilde \widetilde can be used. The \sim command produce a tilde-like binary relation symbol that is often used in mathematical expressions, and the double-tilde ≈ is obtained with \approx.In both text and math mode, a tilde on its own (~) renders a white space with no line breaking.In both text and math mode, a tilde on its own (~) renders a white space with no line breaking. The url package also supports entering tildes directly, e.g., \url{http://server/~name}.

In MediaWiki syntax, four tildes are a shortcut for a user's signature. Three and five tildes puts the signature without timestamp and only the timestamp, respectively.

In Common Lisp, the tilde is used as the prefix for format specifiers in format strings.

In Max/MSP, MSP objects have names ending with a tilde. MSP objects process at the computer's sampling rate and mainly deal with sound.

In Standard ML, the tilde is used as the prefix for negative numbers and as the unary negation operator.

In OCaml, the tilde is used to specify the label for a labeled parameter.

In R, the tilde operator is used to separate the left- and right-hand sides in a model formula.

In Object REXX, the twiddle is used as a "message send" symbol. For example, Employee.name~lower() would cause the lower() method to act on the object Employee's name attribute, returning the result of the operation. ~~ returns the object that received the method rather than the result produced. Thus, it can be used when the result need not be returned or when cascading methods are to be used. team~~insert("Jane")~~insert("Joe")~~insert("Steve") would send multiple concurrent insert messages, thus invoking the insert method three consecutive times on the team object.

In Raku, a prefixing tilde converts a value to a string. An infix tilde concatenates strings, taking place of the dot operator in Perl, as the dot is used for member access instead of ->. ~~ is called "the smartmatch operator" and its semantics depend on the type of the right-side argument. Namely, it checks numeric and string equalities, performs regular expression match tests (as opposed to =~ in Perl), and type checking.

my $concatResult = "Hello " ~ "world!";
$concatResult ~~ /<|w><[A..Z]><[a..z]>*<|w>/;

say $/; # outputs "Hello"
# the $/ variable holds the last regex match result

In YAML, the "Core schema," a set of aliases that processors are recommended to use, resolves a tilde as null.

==== Keyboards ====
The presence (or absence) of a tilde engraved on the keyboard depends on the territory where it was sold. In either case, computer's system settings determine the keyboard mapping and the default setting will match the engravings on the keys. Even so, it certainly possible to configure a keyboard for a different locale than that supplied by the retailer. On American and British keyboards, the tilde is a standard keytop and pressing it produces a free-standing "ASCII Tilde". To generate a letter with a tilde diacritic requires the US international or UK extended keyboard setting.

- With US-international, the ~ key is a dead key: pressing that key and then a letter produces the tilde-accented form of that letter. (For example, ~ a produces ã.) With this setting active, an ASCII tilde can be inserted with the dead key followed by the space bar, or alternatively by striking the dead key twice in a row.
- With UK-extended, the key works normally but becomes a 'dead key' when combined with AltGr. Thus AltGr+# followed by a letter produces the accented form of that letter.
- With a Mac either of the Alt/Option keys function similarly (for an AZERTY keyboard: Opt + n → ~).
- With Linux, the compose key facility is used.

Instructions for other national languages and keyboards are beyond the scope of this article.

==== Backup filenames ====
The dominant Unix convention for naming backup copies of files is appending a tilde to the original file name. It originated with the Emacs text editor and was adopted by many other editors and some command-line tools.

Emacs also introduced an elaborate numbered backup scheme, with files named filename.~1~, filename.~2~ and so on. It didn't catch on, as the rise of version control software eliminates the need for this usage.

==== Microsoft filenames ====
The tilde was part of Microsoft's filename mangling scheme when it extended the FAT file system standard to support long filenames for Microsoft Windows. Programs written prior to this development could only access filenames in the so-called 8.3 format—the filenames consisted of a maximum of eight characters from a restricted character set (e.g. no spaces), followed by a period, followed by three more characters. In order to permit these legacy programs to access files in the FAT file system, each file had to be given two names—one long, more descriptive one, and one that conformed to the 8.3 format. This was accomplished with a name-mangling scheme in which the first six characters of the filename are followed by a tilde and a digit. For example, "Program Files" might become "PROGRA~1".

The tilde symbol is also often used to prefix hidden temporary files that are created when a document is opened in Windows. For example, when a document "Document1.doc" is opened in Word, a file called "~$cument1.doc" is created in the same directory. This file contains information about which user has the file open, to prevent multiple users from attempting to change a document at the same time.

=== Juggling notation ===
In the juggling notation system Beatmap, tilde can be added to either "hand" in a pair of fields to say "cross the arms with this hand on top". Mills' Mess is thus represented as (~2x,1)(1,2x)(2x,~1)*.

== Unicode encoding ==
=== Letters with tilde ===
Unicode encodes a number of cases of "letter with tilde" as precomposed characters and these are displayed below. In addition, many more symbols may be composed using the combining character facility (U+0303 ◌̃ COMBINING TILDE, U+0330 ◌̰ COMBINING TILDE BELOW and others) that may be used with any letter or other diacritic to create a customised symbol but this does not mean that the result has any real-world application and are not shown in the table.

- Tilde ◌̃
  Latin: Ã ã
- Ẵ ẵ
- Ẫ ẫ
- ᵬ
- ᵭ
- Ẽ ẽ
- Ễ ễ
- Ḛ ḛ
- ᵮ
- Ĩ ĩ
- Ḭ ḭ
- ɫ
- ᵯ
- Ñ ñ
- ᵰ
- Õ õ
- Ỗ ỗ
- Ỡ ỡ
- Ṍ ṍ
- Ṏ ṏ
- Ȭ ȭ
- ᵱ
- ᵳ
- ᵲ
- ꭨ
- ᵴ
- ᵵ
- Ũ ũ
- Ữ ữ
- Ṹ ṹ
- Ṵ ṵ
- Ṽ ṽ
- Ỹ ỹ
- ᵶ

A tilde diacritic can be added to almost any character by using a combining tilde. Greek and Cyrillic letters with tilde (Α͂ ᾶ, Η͂ ῆ, Ι͂ ῖ, ῗ, Υ͂ ῦ, ῧ and А̃ а̃, Ә̃ ә̃, Е̃ е̃, И̃ и̃, О̃ о̃, У̃ у̃, Ј̃ j̃) are formed using this method.

=== Unicode and Shift JIS encoding of wave dash ===
Correct JIS wave dash, current in Unicode

Previous Unicode wave dash (incorrect)

In practice the full-width tilde (全角チルダ, zenkaku chiruda) (Unicode U+FF5E ～ FULLWIDTH TILDE), is often used instead of the wave dash (波ダッシュ, nami dasshu) (Unicode U+301C 〜 WAVE DASH), because the Shift JIS code for the wave dash, 0x8160, which should be mapped to U+301C, is instead mapped to U+FF5E in Windows code page 932 (Microsoft's code page for Japanese), a widely used extension of Shift JIS.

This decision avoided a shape definition error in the original (6.2) Unicode code charts: the wave dash reference glyph in JIS / Shift JIS matches the Unicode reference glyph for U+FF5E FULLWIDTH TILDE, while the original reference glyph for U+301C was reflected, incorrectly, when Unicode imported the JIS wave dash. In other platforms such as the classic Mac OS and macOS, 0x8160 is correctly mapped to U+301C. It is generally difficult, if not impossible, for users of Japanese Windows to type U+301C, especially in legacy, non-Unicode applications.

A similar situation exists regarding the Korean KS X 1001 character set, in which Microsoft maps the EUC-KR or UHC code for the wave dash (0xA1AD) to U+223C ∼ TILDE OPERATOR, while IBM and Apple map it to U+301C. Microsoft also uses U+FF5E to map the KS X 1001 raised tilde (0xA2A6), while Apple uses U+02DC ˜ SMALL TILDE.

The Unicode reference glyph for U+301C was corrected in Uncode 8.0.0 to match the JIS standard in response to a 2014 proposal, which noted that, while the existing Unicode reference glyph had been matched by fonts from the discontinued Windows XP, all other major platforms including later versions of Microsoft Windows shipped with fonts matching the JIS reference glyph for U+301C.

The JIS / Shift JIS wave dash is still formally mapped to U+301C as of JIS X 0213, whereas the WHATWG Encoding Standard used by HTML5 follows Microsoft in mapping 0x8160 to U+FF5E. These two code points have a similar or identical glyph in several computer fonts, reducing the confusion and incompatibility.

=== Combining double tilde ===
According to the Unicode 17.0.0 specification, "IPA, pronunciation systems, some transliteration systems, and a few languages such as Tagalog, use diacritics that are applied to a sequence of two letters". Accordingly, it provides encoding for a combining tilde diacritic that spans adjacent characters (although conventionally called a "double tilde", it is in fact a wide single tilde):

- U+0360 ◌͠◌ COMBINING DOUBLE TILDE
- Two other encodings exist but Unicode now discourages their use:
  - U+FE22 ◌︢ COMBINING DOUBLE TILDE LEFT HALF
  - U+FE23 ◌︣ COMBINING DOUBLE TILDE RIGHT HALF

== See also ==
- Backtick – Typographical mark (`) (Freestanding grave accent)
- Circumflex – Diacritical mark (◌̂)
  - Caret (computing) – Typographical mark (^)
- Double tilde (disambiguation)
- Tittle – Diacritical mark, the dot of the letters i and j
- Vietnamese tilde – Curved diacritic used in the early Vietnamese alphabet, a graphical variant of the tilde that was once used as a special diacritic mark in Vietnamese
- Wave dash – East Asian character primarily used to represent a range
