= Insertion symbol =

The term insertion symbol has more than one meaning,,

- when using a cursor (user interface), it is (usually) a vertical bar indicating where text being typed will be inserted
- a caret (proofreading) is a V-shaped grapheme, usually inverted and sometimes extended, used to indicate that additional material needs to be inserted at this point in the text.
- U+2380 ⎀ INSERTION SYMBOL a symbol from ISO 9995-7, representing the Insert key, styled after the proofreading caret

== See also ==
- Caret (computing)
