= Warri State =

Proposed state for Itsekiri people in Nigeria

Warri State is a proposed state intended to be formed for the Itsekiri people, who inhabit the regions of Warri South, Warri South West, Warri North, and itsekiri parts of Edo State in Nigeria. The movement for the creation of Warri State stems from concerns regarding the marginalization of the Itsekiri people by the Delta State Government and the pursuit of lasting peace in the Niger Delta region. In 2012, Edward Ekpoko, then Assistant Secretary of the Itsekiri Leaders of Thought, presented a memorandum calling for the creation of Warri State. The memorandum proposed that the state should be coterminous with the former Warri Division, comprising the present-day Warri North, Warri South and Warri South West local government areas of Delta State. Warri

== Background ==
The Itsekiri people have long voiced grievances regarding their representation and treatment within the Delta state government. Despite contributing significantly to the oil and gas resources of Delta State, Itsekiri communities feel underrepresented and neglected in terms of government representatives, infrastructure, development and resource allocation.

== Demand for state creation ==
The Itsekiri people have long advocated for the establishment of a Warri State as a means to address their concerns about their rights and cry's of being constantly marginalized by the Delta State government because of their minority status. They propose that the new state's boundaries should align with those of the former Warri Division, which encompasses their ancestral homeland. This region, now divided into Warri North, Warri South, and Warri South West local government areas in Delta State, was historically governed as the Warri Kingdom prior to colonial rule.

The Itsekiri people lament that despite being a significant contributor to Nigeria's oil and gas sector, their lands lack basic infrastructure such as federal or state universities, polytechnics, good roads, and hospitals. They accuse the Delta State government of intentionally neglecting them, diverting resources generated from Itsekiri lands to develop other areas while leaving Itsekiri towns and villages in a state of disrepair. The Itsekiri people believe that having their own state would resolve at least 80% of their problems and bring an end to the marginalization they currently face at the hands of the Delta State government.

Despite being a significant contributor to Nigeria's oil and gas production, accounting for over 33% of the nation's output, the Itsekiri people lack adequate representation in government. They hold only one seat in the Federal House Of Representatives out of 360 and have just two representatives in the 29-member Delta State House of Assembly.

The call for a Warri State has been ongoing, with formal submissions made to the National Assembly in 2010 and the National Conference in March 2014. These efforts have garnered support from prominent figures, including the Olu of Warri at the time, Ogiame Atuwatse II, as well as community leaders, legislators, and members of the Itsekiri Leaders of Thought.

The Itsekiri Leaders of Thought also submitted their demands for a Warri State to the Nigerian House of Representatives in April 2024.

== Economic viability of the proposed Warri State ==
=== Oil and gas ===
The 3 Warri LGAs are the source of about 33% of Nigeria's total oil production, and over 78% of Delta State quantum. Warri, the proposed headquarters of the state, is the mega metropolis of the present Delta State and contributes about 70% of its internally generated revenue. Other assets:

- i. Chevron Tank Farm at Escravos
- ii. The EGTL Projects in Escravos (all in Warri South West LGA)
- iii. The Bonga, Okan and over 20 other oil fields
- Iv. The Warri Refinery in Warri South LGA
- V. Chevron & Shell Field Offices in Warri & Escravos
- vi. Ogidigben proposed Export Processing Gas Zone

=== Ports ===
There are three major seaports in Warri, Koko and Escravos, and the last-named loads ocean-liners from its tank farm.

=== Agriculture ===
Fishing trawlers are based within the proposed state for fishing, shrimping & crayfishing. These industries are bound to be major pieces in their agricultural sector.

=== Tourism ===
The Nanna Living History Museum in Koko – the first of its kind in this part of Africa – and the Royal Cemetery, Ijala in Warri – a potential World Heritage Site – are the must-see areas in the new state.

The Itsekiri nation contribute substantially to Nigeria's oil and gas sector, accounting for 60% of Delta State's oil and gas production and 33% of the nation's total production. Despite this significant contribution, they feel marginalized and underserved by the Delta State government.
