= Natural Wonder Beauty Concept =

Studio album by Ana Roxanne and DJ Python
- Released: July 14, 2023
- Studio: Gary's Electric Studio, Brooklyn, New York City, New York, US; Home studios in California and New York
- Genre: Electronic music
- Length: 38:50
- Language: English
- Label: Mexican Summer
- Producer: DJ Python; Ana Roxanne; Al Carlson (additional production); Brian Foote (additional production); CZ Wang (additional production)

Ana Roxanne chronology
Because of a Flower (2020)	Natural Wonder Beauty Concept (2023)

“When we were done, we noticed there’s a theme of falling and it comes out in different ways. It’s not just falling in love. it’s a descent into feeling, losing your sanity, or choosing to do something that’s bad... Feeling hopeless about certain aspects of life.”

—Ana Roxanne on themes in Natural Wonder Beauty Concept.

Natural Wonder Beauty Concept is a 2023 collaborative album between American experimental musician Ana Roxanne and Ecuadorian electronic musician DJ Python. It has received positive reviews from critics.

== Reception ==
Editors at AllMusic rated this album 3.5 out of 5 stars, with critic Paul Simpson writing that this album "bears hardly any resemblance to Roxanne's intimate, R&B-influenced ambient or Python's signature fusion of deep house and reggaetón" and is "a curious and exploratory album that incorporates ever-mutating electronic beats, abstract neo-classical interludes, and cloudlike atmospheric textures, making "a strange, sometimes unsettling record that attempts to make sense of displacement and detachment, and it's most effective when it also provides a sense of comfort and reassurance". Online retailer Bandcamp chose this for Album of the Day and critic Ann-Derrick Gaillot wrote that "atmospheric production, metallic samples, and graceful melodies dance across Natural Wonder Beauty Concept, reminiscent of blinking satellites winding past each other through deep space", making an album that "crystallizes the discomfort of floating through space alone into an electronic-ambient-pop experience for all to share". An overview of the best releases of the week from The Fader included Natural Wonder Beauty Concept, highlighting "Driving" as a stand-out track.

Editors at Pitchfork scored this release 7.4 out of 10 and critic Sam Goldner wrote that the musicians "set about exploring the shared spaces in their practices, uncovering subtle new emotional territories in the process", with some tracks that occasionally tend toward "formlessness" and "a nondescript electronic haze", but which ultimately "shines is in the way it uses Roxanne and Piñeyro’s common ground to reveal deeper textures buried within each artist’s work". Writing for Resident Advisor, Miguel Otárola stated that "Roxanne's steadfast performance that gives the album its strongest moments", calling her vocal delivery "nimble and cathartic", summing up that the musicians have "a winning formula bursting with possibilities". In The Skinny, Joe Creely scored this release 3 out of 5 stars, calling this "a collaboration that meshes their individual styles to occasionally superb ends", continuing that "sonically the record is magnificent, every sound feels perfectly formed and mulled over until it achieves the ideal balance of dreamy and claustrophobic".

== Track listing ==
All songs written by Brian Piñeyro and Ana Roxanne.

1. "Fallen Angel" – 4:00
2. "Sword" – 3:05
3. "III" – 3:44
4. "The Veil I" – 3:02
5. "Natural Wonder Beauty Concept" – 4:24
6. "The Veil II" – 3:30
7. "Young Adult Fiction" – 4:53
8. "Driving" – 4:02
9. "Clear" – 3:04
10. "World Freehand Circle Drawing" – 5:04

== Personnel ==
- DJ Python – instrumentation, vocals
- Ana Roxanne – instrumentation, vocals
- Al Carlson – recording, additional production, additional mixing at Gary's Electric Studio
- Alejandro Carrion – artwork
- Brian Foote – recording, additional production
- Alexandra Tults – layout
- CZ Wang – recording, additional production, mixing at Casa de Haiku, Brooklyn, New York City, New York, United States*Joshua Eustis – audio mastering

== See also ==
- 2023 in American music
- List of 2023 albums
