= Insertion point =

Insertion point may refer to:

- Cursor (user interface), an indicator for a point where input is inserted into a display device
- Landing zone, a military term used for the landing area of an airborne force
- Caret (proofreading), to indicate that additional material needs to be inserted at the point indicated
- Unicode character U+2041 ⁁ CARET INSERTION POINT
