= Filename mangling =

Translation of the file name for compatibility at the operating system level

The process of filename mangling, in computing, involves a translation of the file name for compatibility at the operating system level. It occurs when a filename on a filesystem appears in a form incompatible with the operating system accessing it. Such mangling occurs, for example, on computer networks when a Windows machine attempts to access a file on a Unix server and that file has a filename which includes characters not valid in Windows.

== FAT Derivative Filesystem ==
=== Legacy support under VFAT ===
A common example of name mangling occurs on VFAT file systems on versions of Windows from Windows 95 onwards. The VFAT specification allows Long File Names (LFNs). For backwards-compatibility with MS-DOS and older Windows software, which recognizes filenames of a maximum of 11 characters in length with 8.3 format (i.e.: an eight-letter filename, a dot and a three-letter extension, such as autoexec.bat), files with LFNs get stored on disk in 8.3 format (longfilename.txt becoming longfi~1.txt), with the long file name stored elsewhere on the disk.

Normally, when using compatible Windows programs which use standard Windows methods of reading the disk, the I/O subsystem returns the long filename to the program — however, if an old DOS application or an old Windows application tries to address the file, it will use the older, 8.3-only APIs, or work at a lower level and perform its own disk access, which results in the return of an 8.3 filename. In this case, the filenames become mangled by taking the first six non-space characters in the filename and adding a tilde (~) and then a number to ensure the uniqueness of the 8.3 filename on the disk. This mangling scheme can turn (for example) Program Files into PROGRA~1. This technique persists today when DOSBox is used to run DOS or Win16 programs.

== Unix Filesystems ==
Unix file names can contain colons or backslashes, whereas Windows interprets such characters in other ways: colons are used to specify drives such as A: or B:, and backslashes are used as path separators (unlike Unix systems which use forward slashes). Because of these differences, software could mangle the Unix file "Notes: 11\04\03" as "Notes_ 11-04-03" to enable Windows software to remotely access the file. Other Unix-like systems, such as Samba on Unix, use different mangling systems to map long filenames to DOS-compatible filenames (although Samba administrators can configure this behavior in the config file).

== Mac OS ==
macOS's Finder displays instances of ":" in file and directory names with a "/". This is because the classic Mac OS used the ":" character internally as a path separator. Listing these files or directories using a terminal emulator displays a ":" rather than the "/" character however.
