= I with tilde (Cyrillic) =

Cyrillic letter used for /ĩ/ in Khinalug and Godoberi

- И̃ и̃

Usage
- Writing system: Cyrillic
- Type: Alphabetic
- Sound values: [ĩ]

I with tilde (И̃ и̃; italics: И̃ и̃) is a letter of the Cyrillic script.

I with tilde is used in the Khinalug and Godoberi language where it represents a nasalized close front unrounded vowel /ĩ/. It is a variant of the Cyrillic letter И and is very similar to the Latin letter Ñ.

== See also ==
- Ĩ ĩ : Latin letter Ĩ
- Ñ ñ : Latin letter Ñ
- Cyrillic characters in Unicode
