= U with tilde (Cyrillic) =

Cyrillic letter used for /ũ/ in Khinalug

- У̃ у̃

Usage
- Writing system: Cyrillic
- Type: Alphabetic
- Sound values: /ũ/

U with tilde (У̃ у̃; italics: У̃ у̃) is a letter of the Cyrillic script.

U with tilde is used in the Khinalug language where it represents a nasalized close back rounded vowel /ũ/.

== See also ==
- Ũ ũ : Latin letter Ũ
- Cyrillic characters in Unicode
