= A with tilde (Cyrillic) =

Cyrillic letter used in Khinalug

- А̃ а̃

Usage
- Writing system: Cyrillic
- Type: Alphabetic
- Sound values: [ɑ̃]

A with tilde (А̃ а̃; italics: А̃ а̃) is a letter of the Cyrillic script. In all its forms it looks identical to the Latin letter A with tilde (Ã ã Ã ã).

== Usage ==
A with tilde is used only in the alphabet of the Khinalug language where it represents a nasalized open back unrounded vowel /ɑ̃/.

== In Unicode ==
There is no precomposed character codepoint for this grapheme. It is generated using U+0410 А CYRILLIC CAPITAL LETTER A combined with U+0303 ◌̃ COMBINING TILDE.

== See also ==
- Ã ã : Latin letter Ã - a Portuguese and Silesian letter
- Cyrillic characters in Unicode
