= Khinalug language =

Northeast Caucasian language

Khinalug
- Xinaliq
- каьтш мицI kätš micʼ кетш мицI ketš micʼ
- Pronunciation: [kætʃ mit͡sʼ]
- Native to: Azerbaijan
- Region: Quba
- Ethnicity: Khinalugs
- Native speakers: 3,000 (2007)
- Language family: Northeast Caucasian: ? Lezgic; Khinalug
- Writing system: Cyrillic script, Latin script

Language codes
- ISO 639-3: kjj
- Glottolog: khin1240
- ELP: Khinalugh
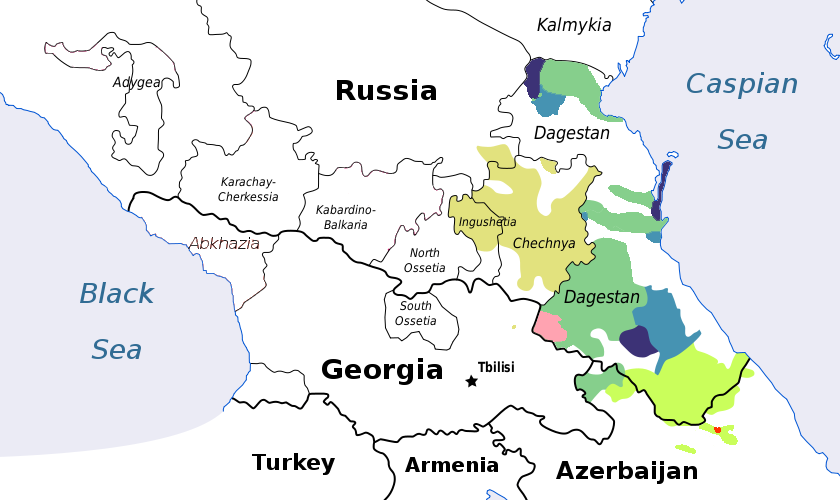
- Khinalug (in Azerbaijan)

- Khinalug is classified as Severely Endangered by the UNESCO Atlas of the World's Languages in Danger (2010)

Khinalug (also spelled Khinalig, Khinalugi, Xinalug(h), Xinaliq or Khinalugh) is a Northeast Caucasian language spoken by about 3,000 people in the villages of Khinalug and Gülüstan, Quba in the mountains of Quba Rayon, northern Azerbaijan. It may either belong to the Lezgic branch of the Northeast Caucasian language family, or it may form its own independent branch within that family.

Khinalug is endangered, and classified as "severely endangered" by UNESCO's Atlas of the World's Languages in Danger.

== History ==
Khinalug is the language of the village Khinalug in the Quba district of Azerbaijan. It has been tentatively classified by previous researchers as a member of the Lezgic branch of the Northeast Caucasian languages. Although Khinalug is the official language of the village, it is mostly spoken by villagers in informal circumstances, while the national language Azerbaijani is used formally for educational purposes and to communicate with non-Khinalug speakers. Khinalug is considered to be a threatened language. In recent years, the road leading to the villages where it is spoken has fallen into disrepair, leaving the area mostly isolated.

== Phonology ==
The Khinalug language previously had its own script. Alexander Kibrik and a team of 13 linguists from Moscow State University visited the village in 2005. In 2007 they developed a Latin orthography for Khinalug, in collaboration with local school teachers in the village. It is presented in angle brackets on the tables below.

=== Consonants ===
Consonants
		Labial	Dental	Postalveolar/ Palatal	Velar	Uvular	Pharyngeal	Glottal
Nasal		m ⟨m⟩	n ⟨n⟩					
Plosive	voiceless lenis	p ⟨p⟩	t ⟨t⟩		k ⟨k⟩	q ⟨q⟩		ʔ ⟨ʔ⟩
Plosive	voiceless fortis	pː ⟨pp⟩	tː ⟨tt⟩		kː ⟨kk⟩	qː ⟨qq⟩		
Plosive	voiced	b ⟨b⟩	d ⟨d⟩		ɡ ⟨g⟩			
Plosive	ejective	pʼ ⟨pʼ⟩	tʼ ⟨tʼ⟩		kʼ ⟨kʼ⟩			
Affricate	voiceless lenis		t͡s ⟨c⟩	t͡ʃ ⟨ç⟩	k͡x ⟨kx⟩^{3}	q͡χ ⟨x̂⟩		
Affricate	voiceless fortis		t͡sː ⟨cc⟩	t͡ʃː ⟨çç⟩				
Affricate	voiced			d͡ʒ ⟨j⟩				
Affricate	ejective		t͡sʼ ⟨cʼ⟩	t͡ʃʼ ⟨çʼ⟩		q͡χʼ ⟨qʼ⟩		
Fricative	voiceless	f ⟨f⟩	s ⟨s⟩	ʃ ⟨ş⟩	x ⟨kh⟩^{2}	χ ⟨x⟩	ħ ⟨hh⟩^{4}	h ⟨h⟩
Fricative	voiced	v ⟨v⟩	z ⟨z⟩	ʒ ⟨z̧⟩^{1}	ɣ ⟨gh⟩^{2}	ʁ ⟨ğ⟩	ʕ ⟨ʕ⟩^{4}	
Trill			r ⟨r⟩					
Approximant			l ⟨l⟩	j ⟨y⟩	w ⟨w⟩			

^{1} The cedilla in the orthography is in the middle of the bottom of the <z>, as is typical of Russian linguistics.

^{2} Kh and gh are rare.

^{3} Kx is very rare.

^{4} The pharyngeal sounds mostly appear in Arabic loanwords.

=== Vowels ===
Khinalug has nine vowels and four diphthongs.

	Front		Back	
	unrounded	rounded	unrounded	rounded
High	i ⟨i⟩	y ⟨ü⟩	ɯ ⟨ı⟩	u ⟨u⟩
Mid	e ⟨e⟩	ø ⟨ö⟩		o ⟨o⟩
Low	æ ⟨ə⟩		a ⟨a⟩	

Diphthongs include: [iu] [ui] [oe] [oa].

== Alphabet ==
Khinalug Cyrillic alphabet
1	2	3	4	5	6	7	8	9	10	11	12	13	14	15	16	17	18	19	20	21	22	23	24	25	26	27	28	29	30	31	32	33	34	35	36	37
А	А̃	Аь	Б	В	Г	Гъ	ГӀ	ГӀв	Д	Дж	Дз	Е	Е̃	Ж	З	И	И̃	Й	К	Кв	Кк	Кх	Кхв	Кхкх	Къв	Кь	КьӀ	КӀ	КӀв	Л	Лъ	М	Н	О	О̃	Оь
а	а̃	аь	б	в	г	гъ	гӀ	гӀв	д	дж	дз	е	е̃	ж	з	и	и̃	й	к	кв	кк	кх	кхв	кхкх	къв	кь	кьӀ	кӀ	кӀв	л	лъ	м	н	о	о̃	оь

38	39	40	41	42	43	44	45	46	47	48	49	50	51	52	53	54	55	56	57	58	59	60	61	62	63	64	65	66	67	68	69	70	71	72	73	74
П	Пв	ПӀ	Р	С	Т	Тт	ТӀ	ТӀв	ТӀтӀ	У	У̃	Уь	Ф	Х	Хъ	Хъв	Хь	ХӀ	Ӏ	Ӏъ	Ц	Цв	Цц	ЦӀ	ЦӀв	Ч	Чч	ЧӀ	ЧӀв	Ш	Шв	Ъ	Ы	Э	Ә	Ә̃
п	пв	пӀ	р	с	т	тт	тӀ	тӀв	тӀтӀ	у	у̃	уь	ф	х	хъ	хъв	хь	хӀ	Ӏ	Ӏъ	ц	цв	цц	цӀ	цӀв	ч	чч	чӀ	чӀв	ш	шв	ъ	ы	э	ә	ә̃

The version below was created by scientists from Frankfurt University in 2013, following research into Khinalug phonology by Moscow specialists.

Khinalug Latin alphabet (2013)
a	b	c	ç	ĉ	ċ	d	e	ə	f
g	ğ	ĝ	h	ĥ	ḣ	x	x̂	ı	i̇
j	k	k̂	k̇	q	q̂	q̇	l	m	n
o	ö	p	p̂	ṗ	r	s	ŝ	ş	t
t̂	ṫ	u	ü	v	y	z	ẑ	ż

Kibrik's alphabet from above is presented again, this time in table form.

A a	B b	C c	Cc cc	Cʼ cʼ	Ç ç	Çç çç	Çʼ çʼ	Ə ə	F f
G g	Gh gh	Ğ ğ	H h	Hh hh	İ i	I ı	J j	K k	Kk kk
Kʼ kʼ	Kh kh	Kx kx	L l	M m	N n	O o	Ö ö	P p	Pp pp
Pʼ pʼ	Q q	Qq qq	Qʼ qʼ	R r	S s	Ş ş	T t	Tt tt	Tʼ tʼ
U u	Ü ü	V v	X x	Y y	Z z	Z̧ z̧	ʕ

== Vocabulary ==
The following words were phonetically transcribed from Khinalug:

Khinalug singular	Khinalug plural	Translation
arhaz	arhazırdır	pen (enclosure for livestock)
cʼimir	cʼimirdir	sparrow
izin	izindir	gingiva
kırab	kırabırdır	galoshes
mısır	mısırdır	rope
nekʼid	nekʼidirdir	back
tʼukʼun	tʼukʼundur	cheek
tʼumbol	tʼumboldur	prune
ustot	ustoturdur	pepper
ustul	ustuldur	table
dalıg	dalιgιrdιr	work
culoz	culozurdur	tooth
jalkan	jalkandιr	mane
kotuk	kotukurdur	tree stump
mekteb	mektebirdir	school (compare: maktab)
mizer	mizerdir	textile

Note: ı is roughly pronounced as the e in "fallen". u is roughly pronounced as the ou in "coup".

== Audio samples ==
Recording by Kamal Kabir-oglu Khasammadov of William Shakespeare’s Romeo and Juliet, 2.2.2–3	Khinalug (phonetic): Iylesh toxun, ment’ekhiyly talashpy chshyi yaza? De inq’qalsh me Juliet’dam inq’me.	English: But soft, what light through yonder window breaks? It is the east, and Juliet is the sun.
Recording by Kamal Kabir-oglu Khasammadov of Shakespeare's Hamlet, 3.1.57 & 84	Khinalug (phonetic): Tagvual sam Tagondaval lishirji deme [...] De kin k’ulluqurval, kin bitiyn inqxer kir me.	English: To be, or not to be, that is the question [...] Thus conscience does make cowards of us all.
Recording by Kamal Kabir-oglu Khasammadov of Shakespeare's Sonnet 36, ll.1–2	Khinalug (phonetic): Yaxe chkne yem, kin djyre kotka djmin q’iq’aly djyresh konde mheppetysh saj me.	English: Let me confess that we two must be twain, Although our undivided loves are one[.]
Recording by Kamal Kabir-oglu Khasammadov of a line from Giuseppe Tomasi di Lampedusa’s The Leopard	Khinalug (phonetic): Djym q’yy kin yag’yqalm Chendj kui ukkoetti q’yy, kin hoz shyspqrt koa.	English: If we want things to stay as they are, things will have to change.

== See also ==
- Khinalug people
- Lists of endangered languages
- List of endangered languages in Asia
