= Ana Roxanne =

American musical artist

- Born: Ana Roxanne Recto; April 1, 1987 (age 39); California, U.S.
- Origin: San Francisco Bay Area
- Genres: Ambient; experimental
- Occupations: Musician; singer; songwriter
- Instruments: Synthesizers; keyboards; vocals; guitar
- Years active: 2015–present
- Labels: Leaving Records; Kranky

Ana Roxanne Recto (born April 1, 1987) is an American experimental and ambient musician and singer. She is known for her blend of jazz, choral, electronic, and Hindustani sounds, and thematic exploration of self-concept and gender identity. She has released an EP titled "~~~" (2015) and two full-length albums, Because of a Flower (2020) and Poem 1 (2026).

== Early life and education ==
Recto was born on April 1, 1987. She is of Filipino descent, and was raised Catholic in a predominantly Filipino community in Vallejo, a city in the San Francisco Bay Area. She was homeschooled until later attending a Catholic high school. Her parents both listened to music often; her father would listen to classical music and oldies, and her mother would listen to rhythm and blues. Recto developed singing ambitions after watching Alicia Keys perform "Fallin'" on MTV. She initially thought she wanted to be a jazz singer. In 2005, she moved to rural Iowa to study in a jazz and classical music program at a community college. While at school, she performed choral music across cathedrals in the Midwest. She eventually dropped out of the program, but finished college and moved to Minneapolis, where she played in a "spazzy prog/math rock" band for three years.

In 2013, she had traveled to Uttarakhand, India to learn traditional Hindustani singing. The experience helped show her how the voice can be used as an instrument in ways that she did not learn in Western music education. After returning to the United States from India in 2013, Recto enrolled in Mills College in Oakland, California, a small university known for its electronic music programs and its queer community. While there, she began experimenting with analog synthesizers and electronic instruments, writing her own music through as a mix of jazz, choral, Hindustani, and experimental music.

== Music ==
Recto compiled several of her songs for her debut EP, titled "~~~". The EP was released at first only among her close friends in 2015. As the work was deeply personal, she kept the release small out of fear of how it would be received. One of her friends passed on the EP to the experimental music label Leaving Records in 2018. The label reached out to Recto, who agreed with the label for a wide release of the EP in 2019. The album was well-received by critics. Pitchfork called it "restful and restorative", and a culmination of Recto's wide variety of musical training and influences. Resident Advisor applauded her vocal work and use of electronic instrumentation. The Quietus commended it as "an ode to self-recognition and revelation that delves deep into personal and sonic depths".

Recto released her first full-length studio album in 2020, Because of a Flower. Beats Per Minute wrote that the album builds upon the work in her EP, writing that her "penchant for textural, spacious, ambient pieces with just a whisper of pop was clear, her compositions projecting various moods and tones across their watery passages". AllMusic described the album as "balming and refreshing", and a reflection of the progress Recto is making on an "intense spiritual and physical journey". MusicOMH highlighted Recto's use of water sounds and field recordings to create an immersive sound. The Guardian wrote that the album "ponders the mutability of gender", and felt like an out-of-body experience. Reflecting similar thoughts, Pitchfork described the record as a "meditation on gender, identity, and self-love".

Recto partnered with DJ Python for the collaborative project Natural Wonder Beauty Concept. Their self-titled debut LP was released on July 14, 2023.

Her second full-length album, Poem 1, was released on May 1, 2026 to positive reviews.

== Personal life ==
Recto is intersex. Critics have noted how her music reflects themes of self-identity and gender introspection. Speaking of her song "I'm Every Sparkly Woman", Recto described it as "a testament to my femininity and empowerment as a woman".
