= Kha with vertical tilde =

Cyrillic letter

- Х̾ х̾

Usage
- Writing system: Cyrillic
- Type: Alphabetic
- Language of origin: Polish language
- Sound values: [x]

History
- Development: Χ χ: Х х; Х̾ х̾
- Time period: 1863–1874
- Transliterations: H h

Other
- Writing direction: left-to-right

Kha with vertical tilde (Х̾ х̾) is an additional Cyrillic letter used in the 19th century in the writing of the Polish language. It is composed of the letter Kha with a vertical tilde.

== Usage ==
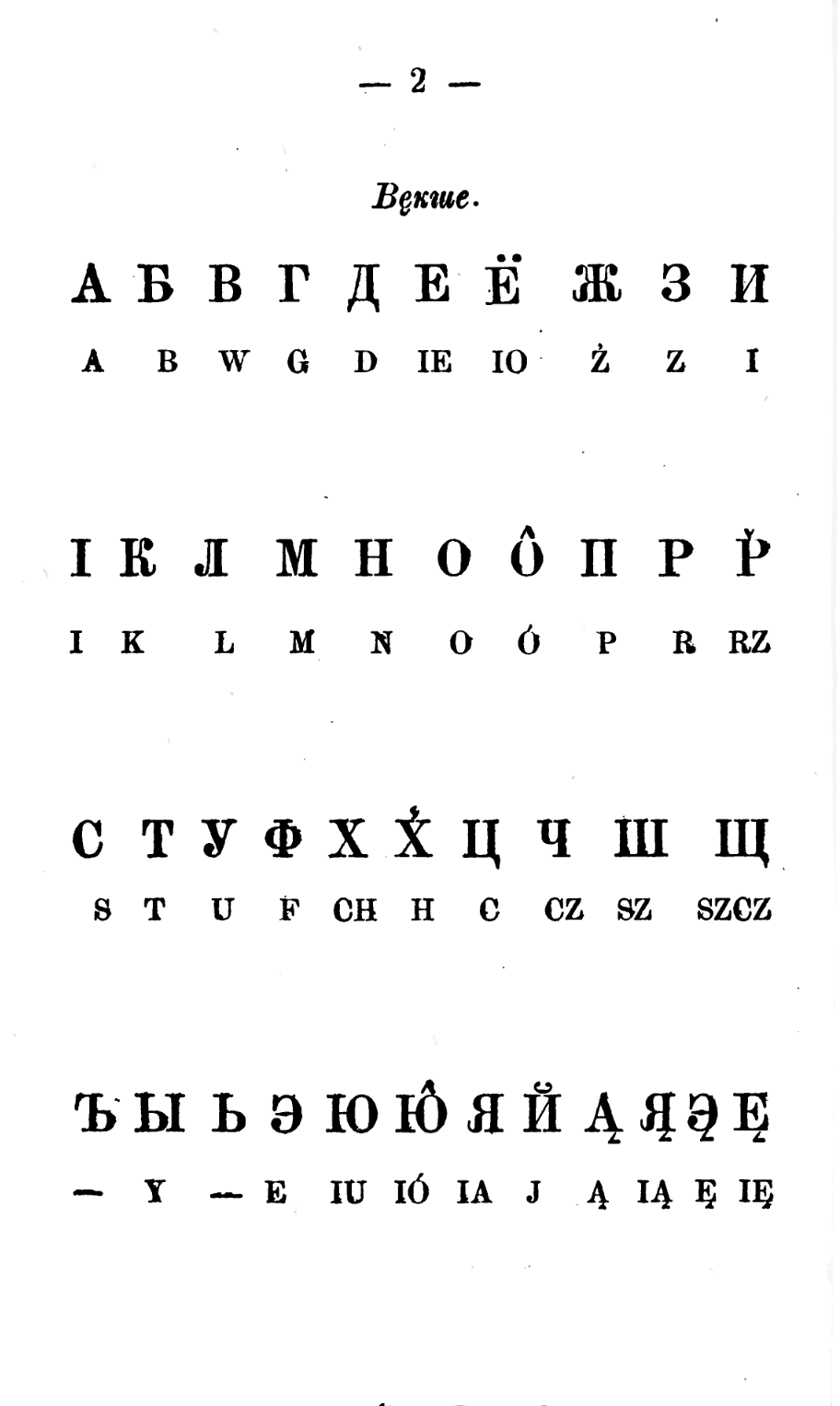

Kha with vertical tilde ⟨х̾⟩ was used in the writing of the Polish language, after the January Uprising and the ban on Latin letters in official documents from 1864 to 1904.

The adaptation of the civil script used kha with vertical tilde as an equivalent to the Latin letter H.

== Computing codes ==
Kha with vertical tilde can be represented with the following Unicode characters (Cyrillic, Combining Diacritical Marks) :

Character information
Preview	Х		х		̾	
Unicode name	CYRILLIC CAPITAL LETTER HA		CYRILLIC SMALL LETTER HA		COMBINING VERTICAL TILDE	
Encodings	decimal	hex	dec	hex	dec	hex
Unicode	1061	U+0425	1093	U+0445	830	U+033E
UTF-8	208 165	D0 A5	209 133	D1 85	204 190	CC BE
Numeric character reference	&#1061;	&#x425;	&#1093;	&#x445;	&#830;	&#x33E;
Named character reference	&KHcy;		&khcy;			

== See also ==
- Tilde vertical
- Cyrillic script
- Kha

== Bibliography ==
- Luto-Kamińska, Anetta (2023). The Cambridge Handbook of Historical Orthography. Cambridge University. pp. 224–244. ISBN 978-1-108-48731-3.
- Элемэнтар̌ъ для дзеци вейскихъ (in Polish). С. Петербургъ. 1865.
- Грамматыка е̨зыка польскего (in Polish). Варшава. 1866.
- Хрэстоматія вейска (in Polish). Варшава. 1867.
