= Double tilde =

Double tilde (~~ or ≈) may refer to:

- Approximation ≈
- Double negation ~(~x)
- Smart match operator in Perl, ~~
- In PostgreSQL the operator ~~ is equivalent to LIKE
- In certain programming languages, ~ transforms a value into an integer and takes its complement, and so ~~ (sometimes called 'two tildes' to indicate a form of double negation) is a way to transform a value into an integer.
- U+0360 ◌͠◌ COMBINING DOUBLE TILDE , a tilde diacritic that spans a pair of adjacent characters: ◌͠◌

== See also ==
- ~~~, an EP by Ana Roxanne
