= Because of a Flower (album) =

Studio album by Ana Roxanne
- Released: November 13, 2020
- Studio: Los Angeles, California, US
- Genre: Ambient
- Length: 39:15
- Label: Kranky

Ana Roxanne chronology
| ~~~ (2015) | Because of a Flower (2020) | Natural Wonder Beauty Concept (2023) |

Because of a Flower is the first full-length studio album by American experimental musician Ana Roxanne. It has received positive reviews from critics and is Roxanne's first release with wide distribution, from Kranky.

== Background ==
Ana Roxanne on the significance of the title and discovering being intersex:

The earliest memory where a flower had some significance was when I was 18, and I found out that I was intersex for the first time. I just was trying to find resources on what it meant and trying to figure out how to meet other people like me. I was living in rural Iowa at the time, at my music school, and just had no idea how to cope with that. This was in 2005, very early social media days. I ended up finding this private support group on Yahoo. The name had a giant umbrella term of "all disorders of sexual development". I don't remember the terminology now.

It was mostly older women and no one lived close to me, but the symbol was an orchid. I can't remember why exactly, but they related it to the rareness of our conditions and our bodies. That was a significant moment. I'm no botanist or plant expert, but through my limited research, there's different species on the planet that are hermaphroditic or have "male" and "female" parts. When I learned that most flowering plants are hermaphrodites, that felt significant to me. I saw flowers in this new sense because they're universally very beautiful. Whereas historically, intersex people are not seen in the same way.

== Reception ==
Because of a Flower professional ratings
Aggregate scores
| Source | Rating |
|---|---|
| Metacritic | 83/100 |
Review scores
| Source | Rating |
| AllMusic | 4/5 stars |
| Beats Per Minute | 79% |
| The Guardian | 4/5 stars |
| MusicOMH | 4/5 stars |
| Pitchfork | 8.0/10 |

According to the review aggregator Metacritic, Because of a Flower received "universal acclaim" based on a weighted average score of 83 out of 100 from 8 critic scores. It is the 80th highest-ranked album of 2020.

Editors at AllMusic rated this album 4 out of 5 stars, with critic Paul Simpson writing that "Roxanne's music is balming and refreshing, yet also reflective of an intense spiritual and physical journey, and Because of a Flower is a quietly powerful encapsulation of the progress she's made". Online retailer Bandcamp chose this for Album of the Day, where critic Alex Westfall noted the detail in Roxanne's compositions, stating that "little nods to humanity become stars in the firmament of Because of a Flower's celestial soundscapes, making their grandeur connect intimately and immediately" and that she has an ability that "amplifies the smallest elements to universal scale without losing their specific character". Ben Beaumont-Thomas of The Guardian rated this release 4 out of 5 stars, characterizing it as an "ambitious follow-up, resulting in greater clarity and vulnerability" than debut ~~~ from 2015, calling this "a magical record, one that instils a mindful awareness of your body while also taking you utterly outside of it".

Matt Cotsell of musicOMH scored this album 4 out of 5 stars, calling it "seven transcendentally harmonious pieces of music that recall the intense delight of cool precipitation upon prickly skin". and predicted that Roxanne's "musical genius will encapsulate multiplicities and blossom of its own accord". Editors at Pitchfork scored this release 8.0 out of 10 and critic Philip Sherburne stated that the mix of "new age, dream pop, Medieval choral music, and Hindustani singing [makes] for a hypnotic and tender meditation on gender, identity, and self-love". Writing for The Quietus, Ed Power noted this release takes the elements of Roxanne's biography and make them "enter a fugue state of mutual empathy, held together by Roxanne's voice which comes swirling in as if from blowing down from a forbidding mountain top" to make music that is "wildly, irresistibly esoteric" with a "sense of wonder... on an LP that largely communicates in a language of its own invention yet continues to have a lot to say". Richard Akingbehin of Resident Advisor stated that this "pieces together a similar set of songs to ~~~, but with a more open and assured mindset", with music that has "introverted euphoria" that "is open to soundtrack any journey of self-discovery".

Because of a Flower placed at 14 on Gorilla Versus Bear's ranking of the best albums of 2020. The Quietus collaborated with Norman Records to publish a ranking of the best albums of the year and this was 30th.

== Track listing ==
All songs written by Ana Roxanne, except where noted.

1. "[untitled]" (lyrics: W. A. Mathieu) – 0:52
2. "A Study in Vastness" – 6:52
3. "Suite pour l'invisible" – 7:03
4. "- - -" – 5:17
5. "Camille" – 5:06
6. "Venus" (lyrics: Jessica Shepherd) – 8:00
7. "Take the Thorn, Leave the Rose" – 6:04

== Personnel ==
- Ana Roxanne – instrumentation, vocals, recording
- Joshua Eustis – audio mastering at Del Olmo
- Brian Foote – recording
- Alessandro Moreschi – piano from J. S. Bach's "Prelude in C Major, BWV 846" on "Take the Thorn, Leave the Rose"
- Jennifer Shear – design
- Vinnie Smith – photography

== See also ==
- 2020 in American music
- List of 2020 albums
