= Chevron (sculpture) =

Sculpture in Chicago, Illinois, U.S.

- The sculpture in 2023
- Location: Chicago, Illinois, U.S.; 41°56′0.2″N 87°37′50.2″W

Chevron is a 50-foot tall, 30-foot wide abstract steel sculpture by artist John Raymond Henry, currently displayed in Chicago's Lincoln Park.

Chevron was originally put on display outside a private home in Chicago's Lincoln Park neighborhood, before its owner was forced to remove it due to the structure overhanging the sidewalk and violating city ordinance. Following several years in storage, Chevron was loaned to the Chicago Sculpture Exhibit, which placed it on display in Lincoln Park next to Lake Michigan in 2015.
