= Top-hat filter =

Signal filtering technique

Top-hat filters are several real-space or Fourier space filtering techniques. The name top-hat originates from the shape of the filter, which is a rectangle function, when viewed in the domain in which the filter is constructed.

== Real space ==
In real-space the filter performs nearest-neighbour filtering, incorporating components from neighbouring y-function values. Despite its ease of implementation, its practical use is limited as the real-space representation of a top-hat filter is the sinc function, which has the often undesirable effect of incorporating non-local frequencies.

=== Analogue implementations ===
Exact non-digital implementations are only theoretically possible. Top-hat filters can be constructed by chaining theoretical low-band and high-band filters. In practice, an approximate top-hat filter can be constructed in analogue hardware using approximate low-band and high-band filters.

== Fourier space ==
In Fourier space, a top hat filter selects a band of signal of desired frequency by the specification of lower and upper bounding frequencies. Top-hat filters are particularly easy to implement digitally.

== Related functions ==
The top hat function can be generated by differentiating a linear ramp function of width $\epsilon$. The limit of $\epsilon$ then becomes the Dirac delta function. Its real-space form is the same as the moving average, with the exception of not introducing a shift in the output function.

== See also ==
- Boxcar averager
- Rectangular function
- Step function
- Boxcar function
