= Ye with tilde =

Cyrillic letter used in Khinalug

- Е̃ е̃

Usage
- Writing system: Cyrillic
- Type: Alphabetic
- Sound values: [ẽ~ɛ̃]

Ye with tilde (Е̃ е̃; italics: Е̃ е̃) is a letter of the Cyrillic script. In all its forms, it looks exactly like the Latin letter E with tilde (Ẽ ẽ Ẽ ẽ).

Ye with tilde is used in the Khinalug language, where it represents a nasalized close-mid front unrounded vowel or open-mid front unrounded vowel /ẽ~ɛ̃/.

== See also ==
- Ẽ ẽ : Latin letter Ẽ
- Cyrillic characters in Unicode
