= Tilde Tilde Tilde =

~~~
- Cover to the digital edition. The cassette and vinyl versions have this photo in white with a border and text.

EP by Ana Roxanne
- Released: March 19, 2015
- Genre: Ambient; experimental music
- Length: 27:07
- Language: English
- Label: Leaving Records

Ana Roxanne chronology
~~~ (2015)	Because of a Flower (2020)

"It feels like I was always singing in code with these songs. Music, even if no one knows what I'm talking about, is a way to be heard. There came a point where I felt like I needed to be out, because even though I was singing about these parts of myself, I still felt invisible."

—Roxanne on re-releasing ~~~ to a wider audience in 2019, after having come out as intersex.

~~~ is the 2015 debut release from American experimental musician Ana Roxanne. It received positive reviews from critics.

== Reception ==
Editors at Pitchfork scored this release 7.3 out of 10 and critic Anna Gaca called the release "restful and restorative, using lo-fi tones and textures to create a work that subtly transcends" and suggested that these songs could stand out among the large quantity of available ambient music as "Ana Roxanne's quiet soundscapes offer the promise of artisanship in an automated age". Jo Higgs of The Quietus characterized this music as "a plethora of synth and organ sounds sees Roxanne's production reach heights at which it births a warming buzz, enveloping the sounds around it, smothering sparse vocal melodies and gushing field recordings of an incoming tide" and completed her review, "requiring a deep and attentive listen, Roxanne's project is certainly not one for anyone, yet still exists for those who can apply themselves to it, opening up a world of electronic sensuality". Writing for Resident Advisor, Lewis Gordon stated the album's last two tracks are particularly impactful for how intimate they are, calling them "an intimate, life-affirming conclusion to a quietly affecting release".

~~~ appeared on several yearly best-of lists. Online retailer Bandcamp put this work at number 11, where J. Edward Keyes wrote that "the six songs on [Roxanne's] hypnotic debut" create "an environment that can be transformative or just very peaceful" with a "sense of solemnity in the face of divinity" that is "a soothing balm to comfort troubled souls". It placed at 43 on Gorilla Versus Bear's ranking for 2019. The Quietus collaborated with Norman Records to publish a ranking of the best albums of the year and this was 76th, where Jo Higgs noted the water themes of the lyrics.

== Track listing ==
All songs written by Ana Roxanne, except where noted.

1. "Immortality" – 4:04
2. "Slowness" – 4:20
3. "It's a Rainy Day on the Cosmic Shore" – 5:20
4. "Nocturne" – 5:36
5. "I'm Every Sparkly Woman" (Nickolas Ashford and Valerie Simpson) – 2:23
6. "In a Small Valley" – 5:24

== Personnel ==
- Ana Roxanne – instrumentation (including Moog IIIP), recording
- Matthewdavid – audio mastering
- Tammy Nguyen – photography, layout
- Jen Shear – artwork, design

== See also ==
- 2015 in American music
- List of 2015 albums
