= O with tilde (Cyrillic) =

Cyrillic letter used for /õ/ in Khinalug

- О̃ о̃

Usage
- Writing system: Cyrillic
- Type: Alphabetic
- Sound values: [õ]

O with tilde (О̃ о̃; italics: О̃ о̃) is a letter of the Cyrillic script. In all its forms, it looks exactly like the Latin letter O with tilde (Õ õ Õ õ).

O with tilde is used in the Khinalug language, where it represents a nasalized close-mid back rounded vowel /õ/.

== See also ==
- Õ õ : Latin letter Õ - an Estonian and Silesian letter
- Cyrillic characters in Unicode
