= Chevron Engineering =

New Zealand based kit-car and race-car manufacturer

Chevron Engineering Specialties Ltd is a New Zealand–based kit-car and race-car manufacturer owned by Evan and Barbara Fray and founded in 1980. It is based in Massey, Auckland and manufactures three different models, with the Aprisa and Cypher competing in New Zealand sports car racing.

== Classic ==
The most numerous Chevron model is the Classic, which is based on the same design concepts as the Lotus Seven. Chevron's first Classic was built in 1984 and was developed further since that time. There were at least two constructed with Leyland P76 V8s.

== Aprisa ==
In the 1990s Chevron developed a race car–based on the Mazda RX-7 drivetrain called the "Aprisa" which was raced successfully on the New Zealand sports car circuit. The car is still available and uses suspension and running gear from both series 4 and 5 RX-7s.

== Cypher ==
In 2010 Chevron began developing a new road/race version of the Cypher. The Cypher has a carbon fibre-kevlar composite chassis and a fuel-injected lightweight 4.4 litre V8 multi-valve engine. It is offered in two forms: a touring version for road, and a race version with a turbocharged fuel-injected engine, space-frame chassis, and unitary body.
