= Schwa with tilde =

Cyrillic letter used in Khinalug

Usage
- Writing system: Cyrillic
- Type: Alphabetic
- Sound values: /æ̃/

Schwa with tilde (Ә̃ ә̃; italics: Ә̃ ә̃) is a letter of the Cyrillic script.

Schwa with tilde is used only in the alphabet of the Khinalug language where it represents the nasalized near-open front unrounded vowel /æ̃/.

== Similar and related characters ==
- Ə: Latin letter schwa, used in Azerbaijani
- Ә: Cyrillic letter schwa

== See also ==
- Cyrillic characters in Unicode
