= Mas Amable =

2020 studio album by DJ Python

Studio album by DJ Python
- Released: 10 April 2020
- Length: 48:32
- Label: Incienso

DJ Python chronology
Derretirse (2019)	Mas Amable (2020)	Club Sentimientos Vol. 2 (2022)

Singles from Mas Amable
- 1. "ADMSDP" Released: 27 March 2020

Mas Amable (transl. "more friendly") is the second studio album by Ecuadorian musician DJ Python. It is considered a pivotal album in the "Latin Club" or "Deep Reggaeton," genres a term the producer uses jokingly. Said to have influenced and helped bring attention to labels such as TraTraTrax. Many artists such as Nick León, Bitter Babe, Veracco, DJ Florentino, and more cite it as highly influential. It was released on 10 April 2020 by Incienso.

== Critical reception ==
Professional ratings
Aggregate scores
Source	Rating
Metacritic	82/100
Review scores
Source	Rating
AllMusic	4/5 stars
Crack	7/10
The Guardian	4/5 stars
NME	4/5 stars
Pitchfork	7.4/10
PopMatters	8/10

At Metacritic, which assigns a weighted rating out of 100 to reviews from mainstream critics, the album has an average score of 82 based on 6 reviews, indicating "universal acclaim".

Year-end lists rankings for Mas Amable
Publication	Accolade	Rank	Ref.
Crack	The Top 50 Albums of 2020	3	
Mixmag	The Best Albums of the Year 2020	—N/a	
Resident Advisor	2020's Best Albums	1	

== Track listing ==
Mas Amable track listing
No.	Title	Length
1.	"Te Conocí"	5:36
2.	"Pia"	5:11
3.	"Alejandro"	4:29
4.	"Oooophi"	6:39
5.	"Descanse"	4:32
6.	"ADMSDP" (with LA Warman)	11:39
7.	"Juntos"	5:34
8.	"Mmmm"	4:52
Total length:		48:32
