= Chevron nail =

- Other names: Herringbone nail
- Specialty: Dermatology

Chevron nail, also known as a herringbone nail, is a rare transient fingernail ridge pattern seen in children, a ridge arising from the proximal nailfold and converging in a V-shaped pattern towards the midpoint distally. The nail growth pattern has no known association with medical problems and tends to resolve by early adulthood.

== See also ==
- Nail anatomy
- List of cutaneous conditions
