= Hat notation =

Mathematical notation

A "hat" (circumflex (ˆ)), placed over a symbol is a mathematical notation with various uses.

== Estimated value ==
In statistics, a circumflex (ˆ), nicknamed a "hat", is used to denote an estimator or an estimated value. For example, in the context of errors and residuals, the "hat" over the letter $\hat{\varepsilon}$ indicates an observable estimate (the residuals) of an unobservable quantity called $\varepsilon$ (the statistical errors).

Another example of the hat denoting an estimator occurs in simple linear regression. Assuming a model of $y_i = \beta_0+\beta_1 x_i+\varepsilon_i$, with observations of independent variable data $x_i$ and dependent variable data $y_i$, the estimated model is of the form $\hat{y}_i = \hat{\beta}_0+\hat{\beta}_1 x_i$ where $\sum_i (y_i-\hat{y}_i)^2$ is commonly minimized via least squares by finding optimal values of $\hat{\beta}_0$ and $\hat{\beta}_1$ for the observed data.

== Hat matrix ==
In statistics, the hat matrix H projects the observed values y of response variable to the predicted values ŷ:

$$\hat{\mathbf{y}} = H \mathbf{y}.$$

== Cross product ==
In screw theory, one use of the hat operator is to represent the cross product operation. Since the cross product is a linear transformation, it can be represented as a matrix. The hat operator takes a vector and transforms it into its equivalent matrix.

$$\mathbf{a} \times \mathbf{b} = \mathbf{\hat{a}} \mathbf{b}$$

For example, in three dimensions,

$$\mathbf{a} \times \mathbf{b} = \begin{bmatrix} a_x \\ a_y \\ a_z \end{bmatrix} \times \begin{bmatrix} b_x \\ b_y \\ b_z \end{bmatrix} = \begin{bmatrix} 0 & -a_z & a_y \\ a_z & 0 & -a_x \\ -a_y & a_x & 0 \end{bmatrix} \begin{bmatrix} b_x \\ b_y \\ b_z \end{bmatrix} = \mathbf{\hat{a}} \mathbf{b}.$$

== Unit vector ==
In mathematics, a unit vector in a normed vector space is a vector (often a spatial vector) of length 1. A unit vector is often denoted by a lowercase letter with a circumflex, or "hat", as in $\hat {\mathbf {v} }$ (pronounced "v-hat"). This is especially common in physics context.

== Fourier transform ==
The Fourier transform of a function $f$ is traditionally denoted by $\hat{f}$.

== Operator ==
In quantum mechanics, operators are denoted with hat notation. For instance, see the time-independent Schrödinger equation, where the Hamiltonian operator is denoted $\hat{H}$.

$\hat{H}\psi = E\psi$

== See also ==
- Exterior algebra – Algebra associated to any vector space
- Glossary of mathematical symbols
- Top-hat filter
- Circumflex – Diacritic (◌̂) in European scripts
