= Caret =

Typographical mark (^)

^o

Caret
- In Unicode: U+005E ^ CIRCUMFLEX ACCENT (&Hat;)

Different from
- Different from: U+2038 ‸ CARET

Caret (from Latin caret 'it lacks') is the name used familiarly for the character ^ provided on most QWERTY keyboards by typing ⇧ Shift+6. The symbol has a variety of uses in programming and mathematics. The name "caret" arose from its visual similarity to the original proofreader's caret, ‸, a mark used in proofreading to indicate where a punctuation mark, word, or phrase should be inserted into a document. The ASCII standard (X3.64.1977) calls it a "circumflex"; the Unicode standard calls it a "circumflex accent", although it is no longer practicable to use it for that purpose.

== History ==
=== Typewriters ===
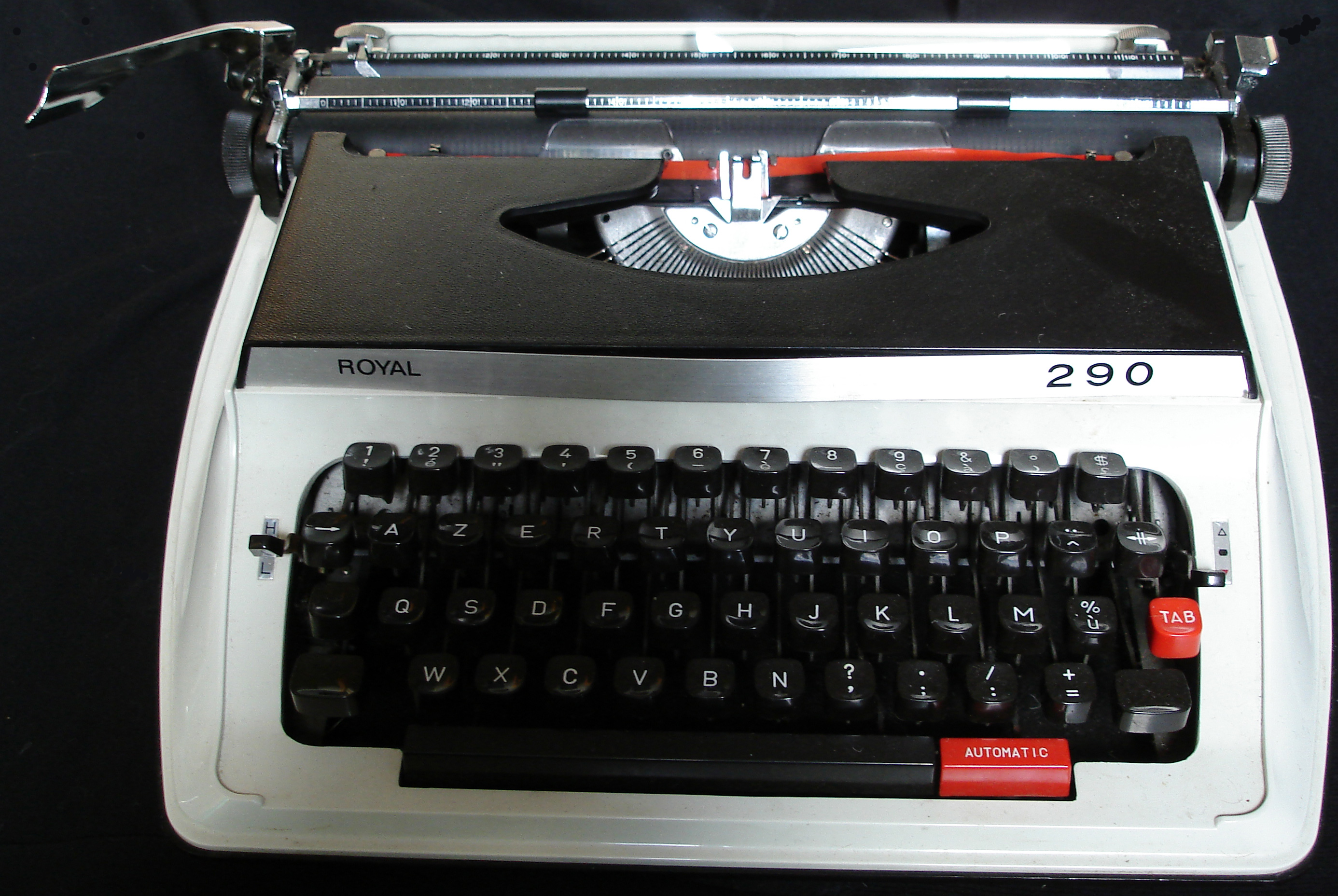
Typewriter with French (AZERTY) keyboard: à, è, é, ç ù have dedicated keys; the circumflex and diaeresis accents have dead keys

On typewriters designed for languages that routinely use diacritics (accent marks), there are two possible ways to type these: keys can be dedicated to precomposed characters (with the diacritic included); alternatively a dead key mechanism can be provided. With the latter, a mark is made when a dead key is typed but, unlike normal keys, the paper carriage does not move on and thus the next letter to be typed is printed under the accent. The ^ symbol was originally provided in typewriters and computer printers so that circumflex accents could be overprinted on letters (as in ô or ŵ).

=== Transposition into ISO/IEC 646 and ASCII ===
The incorporation of the circumflex symbol into ASCII is a consequence of this prior existence on typewriters: this symbol did not exist independently as a type or hot-lead printing character. The original 1963 version of the ASCII standard used the code point 0x5E for an up-arrow ↑. However, the 1965 ISO/IEC 646 standard defined code point 0x5E as one of five available for national variation, (Note: ISO 646 (and ASCII, which it includes) is a standard for 7-bit encoding, providing just 96 printable characters (and 32 control characters). This was insufficient to meet the needs of Western European languages and so the standard specifies certain code points that are available for national variation.) with the circumflex ^ diacritic as the default and the up-arrow as one of the alternative uses. In 1967, the second revision of ASCII followed suit.

^â
Caret compared to lower-case circumflex accent

Overprinting to add an accent mark was not always supported well by printers, and was almost never possible on video terminals. The freestanding circumflex (which had come to be called a caret) quickly became reused for many other purposes, such as in computer languages and mathematical notation. As the mark did not need to fit above a letter any more, it became larger in appearance such that it can no longer be used to overprint an accent in most fonts. Support for accented characters eventually came to be provided by including precomposed characters in character sets, (Note: For instance in ISO Latin-1) rather than by using overprinting.

== Uses ==
=== Programming languages ===
The symbol ^ has many uses in programming languages, where it is typically called a caret. It can signify exponentiation, the bitwise XOR operator, string concatenation, and control characters in caret notation, among other uses. In regular expressions, the caret is used to match the beginning of a string or line; if it begins a character class, then the inverse of the class is to be matched.

ANSI C can transcribe the caret in the form of the trigraph ??', as the character was originally not available in all character sets and keyboards. C++ additionally supports tokens like xor (for ^) and xor_eq (for ^=) to avoid the character altogether. RFC 1345 recommends that the character be transcribed as digraph '> when required.

Pascal uses the caret for declaring and dereferencing pointers. In Smalltalk, the caret is the method return statement. In C++/CLI, .NET reference types are accessed through a handle using the ClassName^ syntax. In Apple's C extensions for Mac OS X and iOS, carets are used to create blocks and to denote block types. Go uses it as a bitwise NOT operator.

Node.js uses the caret in package.json files to signify dependency resolution behavior being used for each particular dependency. In the case of Node.js, a caret allows any kind of update, unless it is seen as a "major" update as defined by semver.

=== Surrogate symbol for superscript and exponentiation ===
In mathematics, the caret can signify exponentiation (e.g. 3^5 for 3^{5}) where the usual superscript is not readily usable (as on some graphing calculators). It is also used to indicate a superscript in TeX typesetting.

The use of the caret for exponentiation can be traced back to ALGOL 60, which expressed the exponentiation operator as an upward-pointing arrow, intended to evoke the superscript notation common in mathematics. The upward-pointing arrow is now used to signify hyperoperations in Knuth's up-arrow notation, with a single arrow representing exponentiation and multiple adjacent arrows representing higher-level operations.

=== Escape character ===
It is often seen in caret notation to show control characters: for instance, ^A means the control character with value 1.

The Windows command-line interpreter (cmd.exe) uses the caret to escape reserved characters (most other shells use the backslash). For example, to pass a 'less-than' sign as an argument to a program, one would type ^<.

=== Upward-pointing arrow ===
In internet forums, on social networking sites such as Facebook, or in online chats, one or more carets may be used beneath the text of another post, representing an upward-pointing arrow to that post; in addition to the arrow usage, it can also mean that the user who posted the ^ agrees with the above post. Multiple carets may be used to indicate that the comment is replying to, or relating to, the post above that correlates with the number of carets used, or to "underscore" the correct portion of the previous post, or simply for emphasis.

A similar use has been adopted by programming language compilers, such as the Java compiler, to point out where a compilation error has occurred. The compiler prints out the faulty line of code and uses a single caret on the next line, padded by spaces, to give a visual indication of the error location.

== Unicode ==
The ASCII assignment to 0x5E was inherited by Unicode. Carets and related and similar characters in Unicode include:

- U+005E ^ CIRCUMFLEX ACCENT (&Hat;)
- U+028C ʌ LATIN SMALL LETTER TURNED V
- U+02C6 ˆ MODIFIER LETTER CIRCUMFLEX ACCENT
- U+0302 ◌̂ COMBINING CIRCUMFLEX ACCENT
- U+039B Λ GREEK CAPITAL LETTER LAMDA
- U+2038 ‸ CARET
- U+2227 ∧ LOGICAL AND
- U+FF3E ＾ FULLWIDTH CIRCUMFLEX ACCENT

== See also ==
- Hat operator, a notation used in mathematics and statistics, is sometimes called a caret
