= Caret (proofreading) =

Inverted V-shaped proof-reader's symbol

‸ ⁁ ⎀o

Caret (proofreading)
- In Unicode: U+2038 ‸ CARET; U+2041 ⁁ CARET INSERTION POINT; U+2380 ⎀ INSERTION SYMBOL

Different from
- Different from: U+005E ^ CIRCUMFLEX ACCENT; U+028C ʌ LATIN SMALL LETTER TURNED V U+2227 ∧ LOGICAL AND; U+03BB λ GREEK SMALL LETTER LAMDA; U+039B Λ GREEK CAPITAL LETTER LAMDA

The caret (/ˈkærɪt/) is a V-shaped grapheme, usually inverted and sometimes extended, used in proofreading and typography to indicate that additional material needs to be inserted at the point indicated in the text. In some of its forms, it is quite similar in appearance to the inverted-v shaped symbol used as a diacritical mark modifying another character known as a circumflex (as in â).

== Usage ==
The caret was originally and continues to be used in handwritten form as a proofreading mark to indicate where a punctuation mark, word, or phrase should be inserted into a document. The term comes from the Latin word caret, "it lacks", from carēre, "to lack; to be separated from; to be free from". The caret symbol can be written just below the line of text for a punctuation mark at low line position, such as a comma, or just above the line of text as an inverted caret (somewhat akin to U+02C7 ˇ CARON) for a character at a higher line position, such as an apostrophe, or in either position to indicate insertion of a letter, word or phrase; the material to be inserted may be placed inside the caret, in the margin, or above the line.

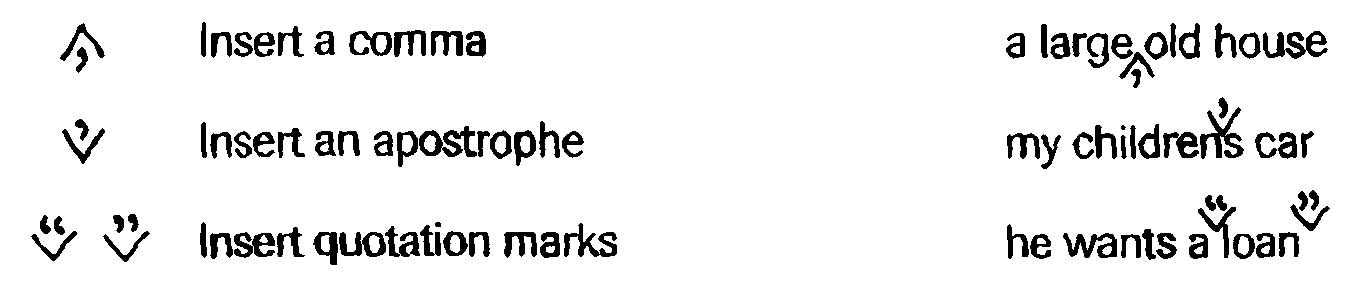
Carets telling reader to insert a comma, an apostrophe, and quotation marks.
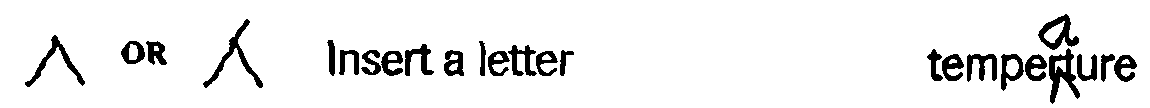
Caret telling a reader to insert a letter.

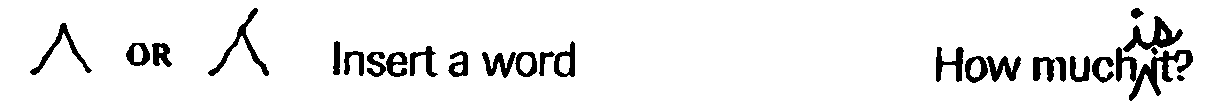
Caret telling reader to insert a word.

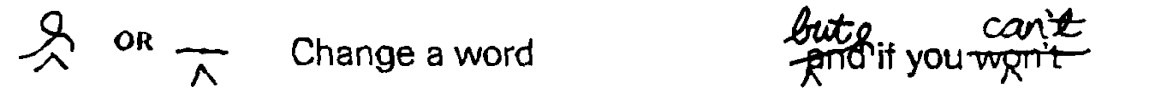
Caret telling reader to change a word.

== See also ==
- List of proofreader's marks
- Circumflex (computing)
