= ISO-IR-68 =

7-bit ASCII variant used for APL

APL Character Set for Workspace Interchange
- Alias(es): IBM-371, ISO-IR-68
- Language: APL syntax and symbols
- Created by: Canadian Standards Association APL Working Group
- Classification: 7-bit modified ASCII with mandatory BS composition

The APL Character Set for Workspace Interchange, registered for use with ISO/IEC 2022 as ISO-IR-68, is a character set developed by the APL Working Group of the Canadian Standards Association. IBM calls it Code page 371. It is one of several APL code pages used for the syntax and symbols used by the APL programming language.

== Character set ==
ISO IR-68
	0	1	2	3	4	5	6	7	8	9	A	B	C	D	E	F
0x	NUL	SOH	STX	ETX	EOT	ENQ	ACK	BEL	BS	HT	LF	VT	FF	CR	SO	SI
1x	DLE	DC1	DC2	DC3	DC4	NAK	SYN	ETB	CAN	EM	SUB	ESC	FS	GS	RS	US
2x	SP	¨	)	<	≤	=	>	]	∨	∧	≠	÷	,	+	.	/
3x	0	1	2	3	4	5	6	7	8	9	(	[	;	×	:	\
4x	¯	⍺	⊥	∩	⌊	∊	_	∇	∆	⍳	∘	'	⎕	∣	⊤	○
5x	⋆	?	⍴	⌈	∼	↓	∪	⍵	⊃	↑	⊂	←	⊢	→	≥	-
6x	⋄	A	B	C	D	E	F	G	H	I	J	K	L	M	N	O
7x	P	Q	R	S	T	U	V	W	X	Y	Z	{	⊣	}	$	DEL

== Composite characters ==
The encoding intends that certain of the above characters should be able to be represented at the same character position to produce additional symbols required for APL as composite characters, such as the following:

Combined characters	Composite character(s)	Unicode
÷ and ⎕	⌹	U+2339 APL FUNCTIONAL SYMBOL QUAD DIVIDE
_ and ∆	⍙	U+2359 APL FUNCTIONAL SYMBOL DELTA UNDERBAR
_ and A to Z	A to Z	
∘ and ⊥	⍎	U+234E APL FUNCTIONAL SYMBOL DOWN TACK JOT
∘ and ∩	⍝	U+235D APL FUNCTIONAL SYMBOL UP SHOE JOT
∘ and ⊤	⍕	U+2355 APL FUNCTIONAL SYMBOL UP TACK JOT
' and .	!	U+0021 EXCLAMATION MARK
' and ⎕	⍞	U+235E APL FUNCTIONAL SYMBOL QUOTE QUAD
| and ∇	⍒	U+234B APL FUNCTIONAL SYMBOL DEL STILE
| and ∆	⍋	U+2352 APL FUNCTIONAL SYMBOL DELTA STILE
○ and \	⍉	U+2349 APL FUNCTIONAL SYMBOL CIRCLE BACKSLASH
○ and |	⌽	U+233D APL FUNCTIONAL SYMBOL CIRCLE STILE
○ and ⋆	⍟	U+235F APL FUNCTIONAL SYMBOL CIRCLE STAR
○ and -	⊖	U+2296 CIRCLED MINUS
∼ and ∧	⍲	U+2372 APL FUNCTIONAL SYMBOL UP CARET TILDE
∼ and ∨	⍱	U+2371 APL FUNCTIONAL SYMBOL DOWN CARET TILDE
∼ and ∇	⍫	U+236B APL FUNCTIONAL SYMBOL DEL TILDE
and /	⌿	U+233F APL FUNCTIONAL SYMBOL SLASH BAR
and \	⍀	U+2340 APL FUNCTIONAL SYMBOL BACKSLASH BAR
