= Digital encoding of APL symbols =

Code pages used specifically to write programs in the APL programming language

The programming language APL uses a number of symbols, rather than words from natural language, to identify operations, similarly to mathematical symbols. Prior to the wide adoption of Unicode, a number of special-purpose EBCDIC and non-EBCDIC code pages were used to represent the symbols required for writing APL.

== Character sets ==
Due to its origins on IBM Selectric-based teleprinters, APL symbols have traditionally been represented on the wire using a unique, non-standard character set. In the 1960s and 1970s, few terminal devices existed which could reproduce them, the most popular ones being the IBM 2741 and IBM 1050 fitted with a specific APL print head. Over time, with the universal use of high-quality graphic display, printing devices and Unicode support, the APL character font problem has largely been eliminated.

=== Character repertoire ===
IBM assigns the following character IDs (GCGIDs) to APL syntax, which are used in the definitions of its code pages.

"SL" (APL functional symbol) series GCGIDs
GCGID	IBM name	Unicode	Notes and other mappings
SL010000	Up Stile (APL)	U+2308 ⌈ LEFT CEILING	
SL020000	Down Stile (APL)	U+230A ⌊ LEFT FLOOR	
SL030000	Del (APL)	U+2207 ∇ NABLA	
SL040000	Del Tilde (APL)	U+236B ⍫ APL FUNCTIONAL SYMBOL DEL TILDE	
SL050000	Del Stile (APL)	U+2352 ⍒ APL FUNCTIONAL SYMBOL DEL STILE	
SL060000	Delta (APL)	U+2206 ∆ INCREMENT	
SL070000	Delta Stile (APL)	U+234B ⍋ APL FUNCTIONAL SYMBOL DELTA STILE	
SL080000	Circle (APL)	U+25CB ○ WHITE CIRCLE	This is SM750000 in a non-APL context, for example, in the C0 replacement graphics from code page 437, which code pages 907, 909 and 910 inherit some or all of, retaining SM750000 in the C0 area and also including SL080000 outside of it. Both map to U+25CB when APL is represented using Unicode characters, although SL080000 can be mapped to U+F890 in IBM's private use area scheme. Compare SL590000 through SL620000 below.
SL090000	Circle Stile (APL)	U+233D ⌽ APL FUNCTIONAL SYMBOL CIRCLE STILE	
SL100000	Circle Slope (APL)	U+2349 ⍉ APL FUNCTIONAL SYMBOL CIRCLE BACKSLASH	
SL110000	Circle Star (APL)	U+235F ⍟ APL FUNCTIONAL SYMBOL CIRCLE STAR	
SL120000	Circle Bar	U+2296 ⊖ CIRCLED MINUS	
SL130000	Quad Quote (APL)	U+235E ⍞ APL FUNCTIONAL SYMBOL QUOTE QUAD	
SL140000	Quad Divide (APL)	U+2339 ⌹ APL FUNCTIONAL SYMBOL QUAD DIVIDE	
SL150000	Slash Bar (APL)	U+233F ⌿ APL FUNCTIONAL SYMBOL SLASH BAR	
SL160000	Slope Bar (APL)	U+2340 ⍀ APL FUNCTIONAL SYMBOL BACKSLASH BAR	
SL170000	Up Caret Tilde (APL)	U+2372 ⍲ APL FUNCTIONAL SYMBOL UP CARET TILDE	
SL180000	Down Caret Tilde (APL)	U+2371 ⍱ APL FUNCTIONAL SYMBOL DOWN CARET TILDE	
SL190000	Down Tack Jot (APL) (Note: There are two naming conventions (which way around "up" and "down" are, and which way around "left" and "right" are) for tack characters, the "London" and "Bosworth" conventions. Which convention is used differs between IBM and Unicode. Naming also differs between composite Unicode characters intended solely for APL (which match IBM naming and use the Bosworth convention) versus plain tacks also intended for other applications (which use the London convention). APL specifications subsequently adopted the London convention. The documentation for Dyalog APL notes that the Unicode naming for composite tacks (and thus the IBM naming for all tacks), which follows the lesser-used "Bosworth" convention, runs contrary to convention in the APL community.)	U+234E ⍎ APL FUNCTIONAL SYMBOL DOWN TACK JOT	
SL200000	Up Tack Jot (APL)	U+2355 ⍕ APL FUNCTIONAL SYMBOL UP TACK JOT	
SL210000	Up Shoe Null (APL)	U+235D ⍝ APL FUNCTIONAL SYMBOL UP SHOE JOT	
SL220000	Up Tack (APL)	U+22A4 ⊤ DOWN TACK	
SL230000	Down Tack (APL)	U+22A5 ⊥ UP TACK	
SL240000	Down Tack Up Tack (APL)	U+2336 ⌶ APL FUNCTIONAL SYMBOL I-BEAM	
SL250000	Jot (APL)	U+2218 ∘ RING OPERATOR	
SL260000	Left Bracket Right Bracket (APL)	U+2337 ⌷ APL FUNCTIONAL SYMBOL SQUISH QUAD	
SL270000	Quad Jot (APL)	U+233B ⌻ APL FUNCTIONAL SYMBOL QUAD JOT	
SL280000	Quad Slope (APL)	U+2342 ⍂ APL FUNCTIONAL SYMBOL QUAD BACKSLASH	
SL290000	Ampersand Underbar		Not used in any documented code page. Can be represented in Unicode with the sequence U+0026 U+0332 &̲
SL300000	Equal Underbar (APL)	U+2261 ≡ IDENTICAL TO	
SL310000	OUT Symbol (APL)	none (Note: Unicode 1.0 had the "APL out" character at U+2301, but it was removed in Unicode 1.0.1.)	Not used in any IBM-documented code page. IBM's reference glyph resembles oblique underlined forms of the letters O, U and T overstruck in the same character position.
SL320000	Diaeresis Dot (APL)	U+2235 ∵ BECAUSE	
SL330000	Delta Underbar (APL)	U+2359 ⍙ APL FUNCTIONAL SYMBOL DELTA UNDERBAR	
SL340000	Left Tack (APL)	U+22A2 ⊢ RIGHT TACK	
SL350000	Right Tack (APL)	U+22A3 ⊣ LEFT TACK	
SL360000	Quad (APL)	U+2395 ⎕ APL FUNCTIONAL SYMBOL QUAD	U+25AF ▯ WHITE VERTICAL RECTANGLE
SL370000	Less Greater (APL)	U+22C4 ⋄ DIAMOND OPERATOR	U+25CA ◊ LOZENGE, U+25C6 ◆ BLACK DIAMOND
SL380000	Stile (APL)	U+2223 ∣ DIVIDES	U+2502 │ BOX DRAWINGS LIGHT VERTICAL, U+007C | VERTICAL LINE
SL400000	Up Shoe (APL)	U+2229 ∩ INTERSECTION	U+22C2 ⋂ N-ARY INTERSECTION
SL410000	Down Shoe (APL)	U+222A ∪ UNION	U+22C3 ⋃ N-ARY UNION
SL420000	Left Shoe (APL)	U+2282 ⊂ SUBSET OF	
SL430000	Right Shoe (APL)	U+2283 ⊃ SUPERSET OF	
SL440000	Underbar (APL)	U+005F _ LOW LINE	
SL450000	Diaeresis (APL)	U+00A8 ¨ DIAERESIS	
SL460000	Tilde (APL)	U+223C ∼ TILDE OPERATOR	U+F88F in IBM's private use area scheme. Also mapped to U+007E ~ TILDE, although SD190000 (U+007E in a non-APL context) co-occurs at 0xA1 (while SL460000 is at 0x80) in code page 213.
SL480000	Circle Plus	U+2295 ⊕ CIRCLED PLUS	
SL490000	Circle x	U+2297 ⊗ CIRCLED TIMES	
SL500000	Down Caret (APL)	U+2228 ∨ LOGICAL OR	
SL510000	Up Caret (APL)	U+2227 ∧ LOGICAL AND	U+22C0 ⋀ N-ARY LOGICAL AND
SL520000	Less (APL)	U+003C < LESS-THAN SIGN	
SL530000	Greater (APL)	U+003E > GREATER-THAN SIGN	
SL540000	Divide (APL)	U+00F7 ÷ DIVISION SIGN	
SL550000	Times (APL)	U+00D7 × MULTIPLICATION SIGN	
SL560000	Not Greater (APL)	U+2264 ≤ LESS-THAN OR EQUAL TO	
SL570000	Not Less (APL)	U+2265 ≥ GREATER-THAN OR EQUAL TO	
SL580000	Quote Dot (APL)	U+0021 ! EXCLAMATION MARK	U+F88E in IBM's private use area scheme. SP020000 (U+0021 ! EXCLAMATION MARK in a non-APL context) co-occurs at 0x5A in code page 293 (SL580000 is at 0xDB in code pages 293 and 310). Tachyonsoft lists U+01C3 ǃ LATIN LETTER RETROFLEX CLICK for SL580000.
SL590000	Left Arrow (APL)	U+2190 ← LEFTWARDS ARROW	These arrows are SM300000, SM310000, SM320000 and SM330000 respectively in a non-APL context, for example, in the C0 replacement graphics from code page 437, which code pages 907, 909 and 910 inherit some or all of. Their APL GCGIDs can be mapped to U+F88D, U+F88C, U+F88B and U+F88A respectively in IBM's private use area scheme. Code pages 907 and 910 keep the non-APL GCGIDs for the C0 replacements but use the APL GCGIDs where the arrows appear outside of the C0 area, while code page 909 uses the APL GCGIDs multiple times, both for the C0 replacements and for between one and two occurrences of each of these arrows outside of the C0 area. Compare SL080000 above. Duplicating C0 replacement graphics outside of the C0 area is not an uncommon practice in DOS code pages: compare, for example, the pilcrow and section sign in code page 850.
SL600000	Right Arrow (APL)	U+2192 → RIGHTWARDS ARROW	
SL610000	Up Arrow (APL)	U+2191 ↑ UPWARDS ARROW	
SL620000	Down Arrow (APL)	U+2193 ↓ DOWNWARDS ARROW	
SL630000	Overbar (APL)	U+203E ‾ OVERLINE	
SL640000	Slope (APL)	U+005C \ REVERSE SOLIDUS	U+F889 in IBM's private use area scheme. Also mapped to U+2216 ∖ SET MINUS. SM070000 (U+005C \ REVERSE SOLIDUS in a non-APL context) co-occurs at 0x5A (while SL640000 is at 0xB7) in code page 293.
SL650000	Star (APL)	U+22C6 ⋆ STAR OPERATOR	U+002A * ASTERISK
SL660000	Quote (APL)	U+0027 ' APOSTROPHE	
SL670000	Left Parenthesis (APL)	U+0028 ( LEFT PARENTHESIS	
SL680000	Right Parenthesis (APL)	U+0029 ) RIGHT PARENTHESIS	
SL690000	Bar (APL)	U+002D - HYPHEN-MINUS	U+2212 − MINUS SIGN
SL700000	Query (APL)	U+003F ? QUESTION MARK	U+F888 in IBM's private use area scheme.
SL710000	Alpha (APL)	U+237A ⍺ APL FUNCTIONAL SYMBOL ALPHA	U+03B1 α GREEK SMALL LETTER ALPHA
SL720000	Epsilon (APL)	U+220A ∊ SMALL ELEMENT OF	U+03B5 ε GREEK SMALL LETTER EPSILON, U+2208 ∈ ELEMENT OF
SL730000	Iota (APL)	U+2373 ⍳ APL FUNCTIONAL SYMBOL IOTA	U+03B9 ι GREEK SMALL LETTER IOTA
SL740000	Rho (APL)	U+2374 ⍴ APL FUNCTIONAL SYMBOL RHO	U+03C1 ρ GREEK SMALL LETTER RHO
SL750000	Omega (APL)	U+2375 ⍵ APL FUNCTIONAL SYMBOL OMEGA	U+03C9 ω GREEK SMALL LETTER OMEGA
SL760000	Slash (APL)	U+002F / SOLIDUS	
SL770000	Left Bracket (APL)	U+005B [ LEFT SQUARE BRACKET	
SL780000	Right Bracket (APL)	U+005D ] RIGHT SQUARE BRACKET	
SL790000	Plus (APL)	U+002B + PLUS SIGN	
SL800000	Semicolon (APL)	U+003B ; SEMICOLON	
SL810000	Equal (APL)	U+003D = EQUALS SIGN	
SL820000	Not Equal (APL)	U+2260 ≠ NOT EQUAL TO	
SL830000	Colon (APL)	U+003A : COLON	Form with fullwidth attribute set (SL830080) is used for 0xA1C3 (i.e. U+2236 ∶ RATIO) in EUC-CN.
SL840000	Dot (APL)	U+002E . FULL STOP	
SL850000	Comma (APL)	U+002C , COMMA	
SL860000	Iota Underbar (APL)	U+2378 ⍸ APL FUNCTIONAL SYMBOL IOTA UNDERBAR	
SL870000	Epsilon Underbar (APL)	U+2377 ⍷ APL FUNCTIONAL SYMBOL EPSILON UNDERBAR	

=== EBCDIC code pages ===
==== Code page 293 ====
Code page 293 (CCSID 293), called "APL (USA)", is an EBCDIC code page which includes APL symbols, in addition to preserving the basic Latin letters and Western Arabic numerals at their usual EBCDIC locations.

Code page 293
	0	1	2	3	4	5	6	7	8	9	A	B	C	D	E	F
0x	NUL	SOH	STX	ETX	SEL	HT	RNL	DEL	GE	SPS	RPT	VT	FF	CR	SO	SI
1x	DLE	DC1	DC2	DC3	RES/ ENP	NL	BS	POC	CAN	EM	UBS	CU1	IFS	IGS	IRS	IUS/ ITB
2x	DS	SOS	FS	WUS	BYP/ INP	LF	ETB	ESC	SA	SFE	SM/ SW	CSP	MFA	ENQ	ACK	BEL
3x			SYN	IR	PP	TRN	NBS	EOT	SBS	IT	RFF	CU3	DC4	NAK		SUB
4x	SP	𝐴̲	𝐵̲	𝐶̲	𝐷̲	𝐸̲	𝐹̲	𝐺̲	𝐻̲	𝐼̲	¢	.	<	(	+	|
5x	&	𝐽̲	𝐾̲	𝐿̲	𝑀̲	𝑁̲	𝑂̲	𝑃̲	𝑄̲	𝑅̲	!	$	⋆/*	)		¬
6x	-/−	/	𝑆̲	𝑇̲	𝑈̲	𝑉̲	𝑊̲	𝑋̲	𝑌̲	𝑍̲	¦	,	%	_	>	?
7x	⋄/◊/◆	∧/⋀	¨	⌻	⍸	⍷	⊢	⊣	∨	`	/∶		@	'	=	"
8x	∼/~	a	b	c	d	e	f	g	h	i	↑	↓	≤	⌈	⌊	→
9x	⎕	j	k	l	m	n	o	p	q	r	⊃	⊂		○		←
Ax	‾	~	s	t	u	v	w	x	y	z	∩/⋂	∪/⋃	⊥	[	≥	∘
Bx	⍺/α	∊/ε/∈	⍳/ι	⍴/ρ	⍵/ω		×	\/∖	÷		∇	∆	⊤	]	≠	∣/│
Cx	{	A	B	C	D	E	F	G	H	I	⍲	⍱	⌷	⌽	⍂	⍉
Dx	}	J	K	L	M	N	O	P	Q	R	⌶	!/ǃ	⍒	⍋	⍞	⍝
Ex	\	≡	S	T	U	V	W	X	Y	Z	⌿	⍀	∵	⊖	⌹	⍕
Fx	0	1	2	3	4	5	6	7	8	9		⍫	⍙	⍟	⍎	EO

Differences from Code page 37

==== Code page 310 ====
Code page 310 ("Graphic Escape APL/TN") includes a larger gamut of symbols, but does not itself include the basic Latin letters or the basic digits. It is used alongside Code page 37 (2), with the Code page 310 codes being prefixed by the Graphic Escape (EBCDIC 0x08) control character.

Code page 310 (prefixed with 0x08) (Note: Documented mappings vary.)
	0	1	2	3	4	5	6	7	8	9	A	B	C	D	E	F
0x																
1x																
2x																
3x																
4x	SP	𝐴̲	𝐵̲	𝐶̲	𝐷̲	𝐸̲	𝐹̲	𝐺̲	𝐻̲	𝐼̲						
5x		𝐽̲	𝐾̲	𝐿̲	𝑀̲	𝑁̲	𝑂̲	𝑃̲	𝑄̲	𝑅̲						
6x			𝑆̲	𝑇̲	𝑈̲	𝑉̲	𝑊̲	𝑋̲	𝑌̲	𝑍̲						
7x	◊/⋄/◆	∧/⋀	¨	⌻	⍸	⍷	⊢	⊣	∨							
8x	∼/~	║	═	⎸	⎹	│/⎥					↑	↓	≤	⌈	⌊	→
9x	⎕	▌	▐	▀	▄	█/■					⊃	⊂	⌑/¤	○	±	←
Ax	¯/‾	°	─	∙/•	ₙ						∩/⋂	∪/⋃	⊥	[	≥	∘
Bx	⍺/α	∊/∈/ε	⍳/ι	⍴/ρ	⍵/ω		×	∖/\	÷		∇	∆	⊤	]	≠	∣/│
Cx	{	⁽	⁺/+	■/∎	└	┌	├	┴	§		⍲	⍱	⌷	⌽	⍂	⍉
Dx	}	⁾	⁻/-	┼	┘	┐	┤	┬	¶		⌶	ǃ/!	⍒	⍋	⍞	⍝
Ex	≡	₁	₂	₃	⍤ (Note: Sharp extension.)	⍥	⍪	€			⌿	⍀	∵	⊖	⌹	⍕
Fx	⁰	¹	²	³	⁴	⁵	⁶	⁷	⁸	⁹		⍫	⍙	⍟	⍎	

==== Code page 351 ====
Code page 351 ("GDDM Default (USA)") contains most of the characters of Code page 293 and Code page 310 (except ⍷, epsilon with underline) in addition to the letters and digits, by replacing several control characters with symbols.

Code page 351
	0	1	2	3	4	5	6	7	8	9	A	B	C	D	E	F
0x	NUL				{	HT			▀		⎹		FF	CR		
1x						NL	BS	▌	█	▐	│	┐	┌		└	┘
2x	⁽	⁾	⁺	⁻	}	LF	⍸	║	▄	═	⎸	§	┼	─	⊢	⊣
3x	⁰	¹	²	³	⁴	⁵	⁶	⁷	⁸	⁹	¶	┬		├	┴	┤
4x	SP	𝐴̲	𝐵̲	𝐶̲	𝐷̲	𝐸̲	𝐹̲	𝐺̲	𝐻̲	𝐼̲	¢	.	<	(	+	|
5x	&	𝐽̲	𝐾̲	𝐿̲	𝑀̲	𝑁̲	𝑂̲	𝑃̲	𝑄̲	𝑅̲	!	$		)		¬
6x	-	/	𝑆̲	𝑇̲	𝑈̲	𝑉̲	𝑊̲	𝑋̲	𝑌̲	𝑍̲	¦	,	%	_	>	?
7x	⋄	∧	¨	₁	₂	₃	ₙ	°	∨	`			@	'	=	"
8x	∼	a	b	c	d	e	f	g	h	i	↑	↓	≤	⌈	⌊	→
9x	⎕	j	k	l	m	n	o	p	q	r	⊃	⊂	⌑	○	±	←
Ax	¯	~	s	t	u	v	w	x	y	z	∩	∪	⊥	[	≥	∘
Bx	⍺	∈/∊	⍳	⍴	⍵	■	×	∖ / \	÷	∙	∇	∆	⊤	]	≠	∣
Cx	{	A	B	C	D	E	F	G	H	I	⍲	⍱	⌷	⌽	⍂	⍉
Dx	}	J	K	L	M	N	O	P	Q	R	⌶	ǃ/!	⍒	⍋	⍞	⍝
Ex	\	≡	S	T	U	V	W	X	Y	Z	⌿	⍀	∵	⊖	⌹	⍕
Fx	0	1	2	3	4	5	6	7	8	9	⌻	⍫	⍙	⍟	⍎	

=== 7-bit modified ASCII ===
==== Code page 371 (IR-68) ====
Code page 371, registered for use with ISO/IEC 2022 as ISO-IR-68, is a 7-bit heavily modified ASCII, designed by the APL Working Group of the Canadian Standards Association, intended for use with APL in an environment allowing overstriking of characters using the BS (backspace, 0x08) control code.

=== 8-bit modified and/or extended ASCII ===
==== Code page 907 ====
Code page 907 is used by the IBM 3812, like code page 906.

Code page 907
	0	1	2	3	4	5	6	7	8	9	A	B	C	D	E	F
0x		☺	☻	♥	♦	♣	♠	•	◘	○	◙	♂	♀	♪	♬	☼
1x	►	◄	↕	‼	¶	§	▬	↨	↑	↓	→	←	∟	↔	▲	▼
2x	SP	!/ǃ	"		$	%	&	'	(	)	⋆/*	+	,	-/−	.	/
3x	0	1	2	3	4	5	6	7	8	9	/∶		<	=	>	?
4x	@	A	B	C	D	E	F	G	H	I	J	K	L	M	N	O
5x	P	Q	R	S	T	U	V	W	X	Y	Z	[	\/∖	]	∧/⋀	_
6x	`	a	b	c	d	e	f	g	h	i	j	k	l	m	n	o
7x	p	q	r	s	t	u	v	w	x	y	z	{	∣/│	}	∼/~	⌂
8x	𝐴̲	𝐵̲	𝐶̲	𝐷̲	𝐸̲	𝐹̲	𝐺̲	𝐻̲	𝐼̲	𝐽̲	𝐾̲	𝐿̲	𝑀̲	𝑁̲	𝑂̲	𝑃̲
9x	⎕	⍞	⌹	𝑄̲	𝑅̲	𝑆̲	𝑇̲	𝑈̲	⊤	𝑉̲	𝑊̲	¢	𝑋̲	⊥	←	⌶
Ax	𝑌̲	𝑍̲								⌈	¬	→	∪/⋃		⍕	⍎
Bx	░	▒	▓	│	┤	⍷	⍸	≡	∵	╣	║	╗	╝	⍂	⌻	┐
Cx	└	┴	┬	├	─	┼	⌷		╚	╔	╩	╦	╠	═	╬	
Dx	↑	↓	⍟	∆	∇	⌊				┘	┌	█	▄	▌	▐	▀
Ex	⍺/α	ß	⊂	⊃	⍝	⍲	⍴/ρ	⍱	⌽	⊖	○	∨	⍳/ι	⍉	∊/ε/∈	∩/⋂
Fx	⌿	⍀	≥	≤	≠	×	÷	⍙	∘	⍵/ω	⍫	⍋	⍒	‾	¨	NBSP

Differences from code page 437

==== Code page 909 ====
Code page 909 is another encoding for APL, differing from code page 907 in not including the underlined characters, assigning different codes to the APL characters which fall in the 0xB0–DF range, and replacing some of the C0 replacement graphics from code page 437 with alternative encodings for certain APL symbols.

Code page 909
	0	1	2	3	4	5	6	7	8	9	A	B	C	D	E	F
0x		⍷	⍸	♥	♦	♣	♠	•	◘	○	◙	≡	♀	♪	♬	⍟
1x	►	◄	∵	⌷	¶	§	⍂	⌻	↑	↓	→	←	⌊	↔	∆	∇
2x	SP	!/ǃ	"		$	%	&	'	(	)	⋆/*	+	,	-/−	.	/
3x	0	1	2	3	4	5	6	7	8	9	/∶		<	=	>	?
4x	@	A	B	C	D	E	F	G	H	I	J	K	L	M	N	O
5x	P	Q	R	S	T	U	V	W	X	Y	Z	[	\/∖	]	∧/⋀	_
6x	`	a	b	c	d	e	f	g	h	i	j	k	l	m	n	o
7x	p	q	r	s	t	u	v	w	x	y	z	{	∣/│	}	∼/~	⌂
8x	Ç	ü	é	â	ä	à	å	ç	ê	ë	è	ï	î	ì	Ä	Å
9x	⎕	⍞	⌹	ô	ö	ò	û	ù	⊤	Ö	Ü		£	⊥	←	⌶
Ax	á	í	ó	ú	ñ	Ñ	ª	º	¿	⌈	¬	→	∪/⋃	¡	⍕	⍎
Bx	░	▒	▓	│	┤	⍟	∆	∇	→	╣	║	╗	╝	←	⌊	┐
Cx	└	┴	┬	├	─	┼	↑	↓	╚	╔	╩	╦	╠	═	╬	≡
Dx	⍸	⍷	∵	⌷	⍂	⌻	⊢	⊣	⋄/◊/◆	┘	┌	█	▄			▀
Ex	⍺/α	ß	⊂	⊃	⍝	⍲	⍴/ρ	⍱	⌽	⊖	○	∨	⍳/ι	⍉	∊/ε/∈	∩/⋂
Fx	⌿	⍀	≥	≤	≠	×	÷	⍙	∘	⍵/ω	⍫	⍋	⍒	‾	¨	NBSP

Differences from code page 437

==== Code page 910 ====
Code page 910 is similar to code page 909, but with fewer duplicate horizontal arrows, using the same C0 graphics as code page 437, and including some additional characters.

Code page 910
	0	1	2	3	4	5	6	7	8	9	A	B	C	D	E	F
0x		☺	☻	♥	♦	♣	♠	•	◘	○	◙	♂	♀	♪	♬	☼
1x	►	◄	↕	‼	¶	§	▬	↨	↑	↓	→	←	∟	↔	▲	▼
2x	SP	!/ǃ	"		$	%	&	'	(	)	⋆/*	+	,	-/−	.	/
3x	0	1	2	3	4	5	6	7	8	9	/∶		<	=	>	?
4x	@	A	B	C	D	E	F	G	H	I	J	K	L	M	N	O
5x	P	Q	R	S	T	U	V	W	X	Y	Z	[	\/∖	]	∧/⋀	_
6x	`	a	b	c	d	e	f	g	h	i	j	k	l	m	n	o
7x	p	q	r	s	t	u	v	w	x	y	z	{	∣/│	}	∼/~	⌂
8x	Ç	ü	é	â	ä	à	å	ç	ê	ë	è	ï	î	ì	Ä	Å
9x	⎕	⍞	⌹	ô	ö	ò	û	ù	⊤	Ö	Ü	ø	£	⊥	₧	⌶
Ax	á	í	ó	ú	ñ	Ñ	ª	º	¿	⌈	¬	½	∪/⋃	¡	⍕	⍎
Bx	░	▒	▓	│	┤	⍟	∆	∇	→	╣	║	╗	╝	←	⌊	┐
Cx	└	┴	┬	├	─	┼	↑	↓	╚	╔	╩	╦	╠	═	╬	≡
Dx	⍸	⍷	∵	⌷	⍂	⌻	⊢	⊣	⋄/◊/◆	┘	┌	█	▄	¦	Ì	▀
Ex	⍺/α	ß	⊂	⊃	⍝	⍲	⍴/ρ	⍱	⌽	⊖	○	∨	⍳/ι	⍉	∊/ε/∈	∩/⋂
Fx	⌿	⍀	≥	≤	≠	×	÷	⍙	∘	⍵/ω	⍫	⍋	⍒	‾	¨	NBSP

Differences from code page 437

=== Unicode ===
Most APL symbols are present in Unicode, in the Miscellaneous Technical range, although some APL products may not yet feature Unicode, and some APL symbols may be unused or unavailable in a given vendor's implementation.

As of 2010, Unicode allows APL to be stored in text files, published in print and on the web, and shared through email and instant messaging. Entering APL characters still requires the use of either a specific input method editor or keyboard mapping, or of a specific touch interface. APL keyboard mappings are available for free for the most common operating systems, or can be obtained by adding the Unicode APL symbols to existing keyboard map.

=== Underscored alphabetic characters ===
Missing from Unicode are the traditional underscored alphabetic characters included in some of the APL code pages; their usage has been eliminated or deprecated in most APL implementations. These were produced on APL printing terminals by over-striking a straight capital letter with an underscore character. Some tables show them simulated with underlined and italic markup, not listing Unicode mappings.

IBM assigns them GCGIDs as "LA480000" (which they name "A Line Below Capital/A Underscore (APL)"), "LB480000" ("B Line Below Capital/B Underscore (APL)") and so forth, under the "L" series used for Latin letters. The use of an even number (48) rather than an odd number (47) is due to being uppercase: compare the use of SD110000 for a lone acute accent ´, LA110000 for the lowercase á, and LA120000 for the uppercase Á. They are included in IBM's private use area scheme, encoded in reverse‑alphabetical order in the odd-numbered code points from U+F8BF to U+F8F1.

Homologous uses of 47 include the "SD" (diacritic) series GCGID SD470000 for "Line Below/Discontinuous Underscore"—i.e. macron below, distinct from the ASCII underscore which is SP090000 ("Underline/Continuous Underscore")—and the "A" (Arabic letter) series GCGID AD470009 for the ḏāl, for example. Unicode's Latin Extended Additional block includes the following capital "Line Below" characters with the macron below diacritic, for Semitic transcription (it includes a pre-composed ẖ only in lowercase):

- U+1E06 Ḇ LATIN CAPITAL LETTER B WITH LINE BELOW
- U+1E0E Ḏ LATIN CAPITAL LETTER D WITH LINE BELOW
- U+1E34 Ḵ LATIN CAPITAL LETTER K WITH LINE BELOW
- U+1E3A Ḻ LATIN CAPITAL LETTER L WITH LINE BELOW
- U+1E48 Ṉ LATIN CAPITAL LETTER N WITH LINE BELOW
- U+1E5E Ṟ LATIN CAPITAL LETTER R WITH LINE BELOW
- U+1E6E Ṯ LATIN CAPITAL LETTER T WITH LINE BELOW
- U+1E94 Ẕ LATIN CAPITAL LETTER Z WITH LINE BELOW

However, this does not cover the entire ISO basic Latin alphabet, and IBM's reference glyphs for the APL characters show them both underlined and oblique, and tables simulating them with markup may follow suit. Unicode's Mathematical Alphanumeric Symbols block includes italic characters for use in notations where they are contrastive with non-italic characters. Unicode also includes combining forms of the macron below and underscore in the Combining Diacritical Marks block; the characters above canonically decompose with the former:

- U+0331 ◌̱ COMBINING MACRON BELOW
- U+0332 ◌̲ COMBINING LOW LINE

== Keyboard layout ==
There are mnemonics associating an APL character with a letter: ? (question mark) on Q, ⋆ (power) on P, ρ (rho) on R, ⊥ (base value) on B, ⊤ (eNcode) on N, ∣ (modulus) on M and so on. This makes it easier for an English-language speaker to type APL on a non-APL keyboard, providing one has visual feedback on one's screen. Also, decals have been produced for attachment to standard keyboards, either on the front of the keys or on the top of them.

APL keyboard layout.

Later IBM terminals, notably the IBM 3270 display stations, had an alternate keyboard arrangement which is the basis for some of the modern APL keyboard layouts in use today.

Further APL characters were available by overstriking one character with another. For example, the log symbol (⍟) was formed by overstriking ⇧ Shift+P with ⇧ Shift+O. This extended the graphic abilities of the earlier teleprinters, but made it more complex to correct errors and edit program lines.

New overstrikes were introduced by vendors as they produced versions of APL tailored to specific hardware, system features, file systems, and so on. Further, printing terminals and early APL cathode-ray terminals were able to display arbitrary overstrikes, but as personal computers rapidly replaced terminals as a data-entry device, APL character support became provided as an APL Character Generator ROM or a soft character set rendered by the display device. With the advent of the modern PC, APL characters were defined in specific fonts, eliminating the distinction between overstruck characters and standard characters.

Finally, the symbols were ratified in Unicode and given specific code points, with unambiguous interpretations, independently of the graphic font.

== See also ==
- APL syntax and symbols
- ISO IR-68
