= Overwriting =

Overwrite or overwriting can refer to:

- Overwriting (prose), a writing style of needlessly over-elaborating a point
- Overwriting (cognitive memory), a type of interference with memory
- Data erasure

== See also ==
- Overstrike
- Overtype
