= Overstrike =

Technique of printing two characters atop one another

In typography, overstrike is a method of printing characters that are missing from the printer's character set. The character is created by placing one character on another – for example, overstriking ⟨L⟩ with ⟨-⟩ results in printing a ⟨Ł⟩ (L with stroke) character.

The ASCII code supports six different diacritics. These are: grave accent, tilde, acute accent (approximated by the apostrophe), diaeresis (double quote), cedilla (comma), and circumflex accent. Each is typed by typing the preceding character, then backspace, and then the 'related character', which is ⟨`⟩, ⟨~⟩, ⟨'⟩, ⟨"⟩, or ⟨^⟩, respectively for the above-mentioned accents.

With the wide adoption of Unicode (especially UTF-8, which supports a much larger number of characters in different writing systems), this technique is of little use today. However, combining characters such as diacritics are still used to depict characters which cannot be shown otherwise.

Left: letter A in regular font. Middle: Two letter A's superimposed, one of which is slightly offset to the side. Right: Resulting "fake bold" character

Many font renderers in computer programs invent missing bold characters by overstriking the normal character with itself, slightly horizontally offset. The horizontal offset is essential since, unlike a typewriter where repeating a letter in exactly the same space will make it darker, most modern printers will not darken repeated "strikes" to the same space. Actual bold fonts are designed with some features thicker and others the same size as a regular font, so the use of this "fake bold" is considered undesirable from a typographic point of view. Overstriking with an offset was also used to created "Blackboard bold" style characters used in mathematics.

The character set for the APL programming language includes several characters that were printed by overstriking other characters on printing terminals such as the IBM 2741; for example, the "lamp"-shaped comment introducer ⍝ was achieved by overstriking ∩ with ∘. In fact, at least one APL implementation (Multics') recognized the overstriking of F with L as simply another spelling of E.

The WordPerfect word processor includes overstrike functionality. Collabora Online, LibreOffice and Microsoft Word do not; however Collabora Online and LibreOffice allow the use of the characters X and / (forward slash) to overstrike, using the strikethrough function. No known keyboard arrangement includes a function key that allows any two characters to be superimposed.
