= APL syntax and symbols =

Set of rules defining correctly structured programs

The programming language APL is distinctive in being symbolic rather than lexical: its primitives are denoted by symbols, not words. These symbols were originally devised as a mathematical notation to describe algorithms. APL programmers often assign informal names when discussing functions and operators (for example, "product" for ×/) but the core functions and operators provided by the language are denoted by non-textual symbols.

== Monadic and dyadic functions ==
Most symbols denote functions or operators. A monadic function takes as its argument the result of evaluating everything to its right. (Moderated in the usual way by parentheses.) A dyadic function has another argument, the first item of data on its left. Many symbols denote both monadic and dyadic functions, interpreted according to use. For example, ⌊3.2 gives 3, the largest integer not above the argument, and 3⌊2 gives 2, the lower of the two arguments.

== Functions and operators ==
APL uses the term operator in Heaviside’s sense as a moderator of a function as opposed to some other programming language's use of the same term as something that operates on data, ref. relational operator and operators generally. Other programming languages also sometimes use this term interchangeably with function, however both terms are used in APL more precisely. Early definitions of APL symbols were very specific about how symbols were categorized. For example, the operator reduce is denoted by a forward slash and reduces an array along one axis by interposing its function operand. An example of reduce:

      ×/2 3 4
24

<< Equivalent results in APL >>
<< Reduce operator / used at left

      2×3×4
24

In the above case, the reduce or slash operator moderates the multiply function. The expression ×/2 3 4 evaluates to a scalar (1 element only) result through reducing an array by multiplication. The above case is simplified, imagine multiplying (adding, subtracting or dividing) more than just a few numbers together. (From a vector, ×/ returns the product of all its elements.)

      1 0 1\45 67
45 0 67

<< Opposite results in APL >>
<< Expand dyadic function \ used at left
Replicate dyadic function / used at right >>

      1 0 1/45 0 67
45 67

The above dyadic functions examples [left and right examples] (using the same / symbol, right example) demonstrate how Boolean values (0s and 1s) can be used as left arguments for the \ expand and / replicate functions to produce exactly opposite results. On the left side, the 2-element vector {45 67} is expanded where Boolean 0s occur to result in a 3-element vector {45 0 67} — note how APL inserted a 0 into the vector. Conversely, the exact opposite occurs on the right side — where a 3-element vector becomes just 2-elements; Boolean 0s delete items using the dyadic / slash function. APL symbols also operate on lists (vector) of items using data types other than just numeric, for example a 2-element vector of character strings {"Apples" "Oranges"} could be substituted for numeric vector {45 67} above.

== Syntax rules ==
In APL the precedence hierarchy for functions or operators is strictly positional: expressions are evaluated right-to-left. APL does not follow the usual operator precedence of other programming languages; for example, × does not bind its operands any more "tightly" than +. Instead of operator precedence, APL defines a notion of scope.

The scope of a function determines its arguments. Functions have long right scope: that is, they take as right arguments everything to their right. A dyadic function has short left scope: it takes as its left arguments the first piece of data to its left. For example, (leftmost column below is actual program code from an APL user session, indented = actual user input, not-indented = result returned by APL interpreter):

   1 ÷ 2 ⌊ 3 × 4 - 5
¯0.3333333333
   1 ÷ 2 ⌊ 3 × ¯1
¯0.3333333333
   1 ÷ 2 ⌊ ¯3
¯0.3333333333
   1 ÷ ¯3
¯0.3333333333

<< First note there are no parentheses and
APL is going to execute from right-to-left.
Step 1{of topmost APL code entered at left}) 4-5 = -1.

Step 2) 3 times -1 = -3.
Step 3) Take the floor or lower of 2 and -3 = -3.
Step 4) Divide 1 by -3 = -0.3333333333 = final result.

An operator may have function or data operands and evaluate to a dyadic or monadic function. Operators have long left scope. An operator takes as its left operand the longest function to its left. For example:

     ∘.=/⍳¨3 3
 1 0 0
 0 1 0
 0 0 1

APL atomic or piecemeal sub-analysis (full explanation):
Beginning rightmost: ⍳¨3 3 produces a 2-element nested APL vector { {1 2 3} {1 2 3} } where each element is itself a vector {1 2 3}. Iota ⍳3 by itself would produce {1 2 3}.

The diaeresis ¨ or mini double-dot means repeat or over each or perform each separately so iota repeats (in human i.e., reversed terms, the APL interpreter reads 3 3 over each use iota), concisely: iota for each 3.

The left operand for the over-each operator ¨ is the index ⍳ function. The derived function ⍳¨ is used monadically and takes as its right operand the vector 3 3. The left scope of each is terminated by the reduce operator, denoted by the forward slash. Its left operand is the function expression to its left: the outer product of the equals function. The result of ∘.=/ is a monadic function. With a function's usual long right scope, it takes as its right argument the result of ⍳¨3 3. Thus

     (⍳3)(⍳3)
1 2 3  1 2 3
     (⍳3)∘.=⍳3
1 0 0
0 1 0
0 0 1
     ⍳¨3 3
1 2 3  1 2 3
     ∘.=/⍳¨3 3
 1 0 0
 0 1 0
 0 0 1

Equivalent results in APL: (⍳3)(⍳3) and ⍳¨3 3 << Rightmost expression is more concise.

The matrix of 1s and 0s similarly produced by ∘.=/⍳¨3 3 and (⍳3)∘.=⍳3 is called an identity matrix.

Identity matrices are useful in solving matrix determinants, groups of linear equations and multiple regression.

      im ← ∘.=⍨∘⍳
      im 3
 1 0 0
 0 1 0
 0 0 1

Some APL interpreters support the compose operator ∘ and the commute operator ⍨. The former ∘ glues functions together so that foo∘bar, for example, could be a hypothetical function that applies defined function foo to the result of defined function bar; foo and bar can represent any existing function. In cases where a dyadic function is moderated by commute and then used monadically, its right argument is taken as its left argument as well. Thus, a derived or composed function (named im at left) is used in the APL user session to return a 9-element identity matrix using its right argument, parameter or operand = 3.

      Letters←"ABCDE"
      Letters
ABCDE
      ⍴Letters
5
      FindIt←"CABS"
      FindIt
CABS
      ⍴FindIt
4

      Letters ⍳ FindIt
3 1 2 6

Example using APL to index ⍳ or find (or not find) elements in a character vector:

First, variable Letters is assigned a vector of 5-elements, in this case - letters of the alphabet.

The shape ⍴ or character vector-length of Letters is 5.

Variable FindIt is assigned what to search for in Letters and its length is 4 characters.

1 2 3 4 5 << vector positions or index #'s in Letters
ABCDE

At left, dyadic function iota searches through its left argument(Letters) for the search string (iota's right argument, FindIt).

Iota finds letter "C" at position 3 in Letters, it finds "A" at position 1, and "B" at position 2. Iota does not find letter "S"

anywhere in variable Letters so it returns the number 6 which is 1 greater than the length of Letters. Iota found letters

"CAB" (3 1 2). Iota correctly did not find "S" (6).

== Monadic functions ==
Name(s)	Notation	Meaning	Unicode code point
Roll	?B	One integer selected randomly from the first B integers	U+003F ? QUESTION MARK
Ceiling	⌈B	Least integer greater than or equal to B	U+2308 ⌈ LEFT CEILING
Floor	⌊B	Greatest integer less than or equal to B	U+230A ⌊ LEFT FLOOR
Shape, Rho	⍴B	Number of components in each dimension of B	U+2374 ⍴ APL FUNCTIONAL SYMBOL RHO
Not, Tilde	∼B	Logical: ∼1 is 0, ∼0 is 1	U+223C ∼ TILDE OPERATOR
Absolute value	∣B	Magnitude of B	U+2223 ∣ DIVIDES
Index generator, Iota	⍳B	Vector of the first B integers	U+2373 ⍳ APL FUNCTIONAL SYMBOL IOTA
Exponential	⋆B	e to the B power	U+22C6 ⋆ STAR OPERATOR
Negation	−B	Changes sign of B	U+2212 − MINUS SIGN
Conjugate	+B	The complex conjugate of B (real numbers are returned unchanged)	U+002B + PLUS SIGN
Signum	×B	¯1 if B<0; 0 if B=0; 1 if B>0	U+00D7 × MULTIPLICATION SIGN
Reciprocal	÷B	1 divided by B	U+00F7 ÷ DIVISION SIGN
Ravel, Catenate, Laminate	,B	Reshapes B into a vector	U+002C , COMMA
Matrix inverse, Monadic Quad Divide	⌹B	Inverse of matrix B	U+2339 ⌹ APL FUNCTIONAL SYMBOL QUAD DIVIDE
Pi times	○B	Multiply by π	U+25CB ○ WHITE CIRCLE
Logarithm	⍟B	Natural logarithm of B	U+235F ⍟ APL FUNCTIONAL SYMBOL CIRCLE STAR
Reversal	⌽B	Reverse elements of B along last axis	U+233D ⌽ APL FUNCTIONAL SYMBOL CIRCLE STILE
Reversal	⊖B	Reverse elements of B along first axis	U+2296 ⊖ CIRCLED MINUS
Grade up	⍋B	Indices of B which will arrange B in ascending order	U+234B ⍋ APL FUNCTIONAL SYMBOL DELTA STILE
Grade down	⍒B	Indices of B which will arrange B in descending order	U+2352 ⍒ APL FUNCTIONAL SYMBOL DEL STILE
Execute	⍎B	Execute an APL expression	U+234E ⍎ APL FUNCTIONAL SYMBOL DOWN TACK JOT
Monadic format	⍕B	A character representation of B	U+2355 ⍕ APL FUNCTIONAL SYMBOL UP TACK JOT
Monadic transpose	⍉B	Reverse the axes of B	U+2349 ⍉ APL FUNCTIONAL SYMBOL CIRCLE BACKSLASH
Factorial	!B	Product of integers 1 to B	U+0021 ! EXCLAMATION MARK
Depth	≡B	Nesting depth: 1 for un-nested array	U+2261 ≡ IDENTICAL TO
Table	⍪B	Makes B into a table, a 2-dimensional array.	U+236A ⍪ APL FUNCTIONAL SYMBOL COMMA BAR

== Dyadic functions ==
Name(s)	Notation	Meaning	Unicode code point
Add	A+B	Sum of A and B	U+002B + PLUS SIGN
Subtract	A−B	A minus B	U+2212 − MINUS SIGN
Multiply	A×B	A multiplied by B	U+00D7 × MULTIPLICATION SIGN
Divide	A÷B	A divided by B	U+00F7 ÷ DIVISION SIGN
Exponentiation	A⋆B	A raised to the B power	U+22C6 ⋆ STAR OPERATOR
Circle	A○B	Trigonometric functions of B selected by A A=1: sin(B)    A=2: cos(B)    A=3: tan(B)    A=5: sinh(B) A=6: cosh(B) A=7: tanh(B) Negatives produce the inverse of the respective functions	U+25CB ○ WHITE CIRCLE
Deal	A?B	A distinct integers selected randomly from the first B integers (without replacement)	U+003F ? QUESTION MARK
Membership, Epsilon	A∈B	1 for elements of A present in B; 0 where not.	U+2208 ∈ ELEMENT OF
Find, Epsilon Underbar	A⍷B	1 for starting point of multi-item array A present in B; 0 where not.	U+2377 ⍷ APL FUNCTIONAL SYMBOL EPSILON UNDERBAR
Maximum, Ceiling	A⌈B	The greater value of A or B	U+2308 ⌈ LEFT CEILING
Minimum, Floor	A⌊B	The smaller value of A or B	U+230A ⌊ LEFT FLOOR
Reshape, Dyadic Rho	A⍴B	Array of shape A with data B	U+2374 ⍴ APL FUNCTIONAL SYMBOL RHO
Take	A↑B	Select the first (or last) A elements of B according to ×A	U+2191 ↑ UPWARDS ARROW
Drop	A↓B	Remove the first (or last) A elements of B according to ×A	U+2193 ↓ DOWNWARDS ARROW
Decode	A⊥B	Value of a polynomial whose coefficients are B at A	U+22A5 ⊥ UP TACK
Encode	A⊤B	Base-A representation of the value of B	U+22A4 ⊤ DOWN TACK
Residue	A∣B	B modulo A; A divides B	U+2223 ∣ DIVIDES
Catenation	A,B	Elements of B appended to the elements of A	U+002C , COMMA
Expansion, Dyadic Backslash	A\B	Insert zeros (or blanks) in B corresponding to zeros in A	U+005C \ REVERSE SOLIDUS
Compression, Dyadic Slash	A/B	Select elements in B corresponding to ones in A	U+002F / SOLIDUS
Index of, Dyadic Iota	A⍳B	The location (index) of B in A; 1+⍴A if not found	U+2373 ⍳ APL FUNCTIONAL SYMBOL IOTA
Matrix divide, Dyadic Quad Divide	A⌹B	Solution to system of linear equations, multiple regression Ax = B	U+2339 ⌹ APL FUNCTIONAL SYMBOL QUAD DIVIDE
Rotation	A⌽B	The elements of B are rotated A positions	U+233D ⌽ APL FUNCTIONAL SYMBOL CIRCLE STILE
Rotation	A⊖B	The elements of B are rotated A positions along the first axis	U+2296 ⊖ CIRCLED MINUS
Logarithm	A⍟B	Logarithm of B to base A	U+235F ⍟ APL FUNCTIONAL SYMBOL CIRCLE STAR
Dyadic format	A⍕B	Format B into a character matrix according to A	U+2355 ⍕ APL FUNCTIONAL SYMBOL UP TACK JOT
General transpose	A⍉B	The axes of B are ordered by A	U+2349 ⍉ APL FUNCTIONAL SYMBOL CIRCLE BACKSLASH
Combinations	A!B	Number of combinations of B taken A at a time	U+0021 ! EXCLAMATION MARK
Diaeresis, Dieresis, Double-Dot	A¨B	Over each, or perform each separately; B = on these; A = operation to perform or using (e.g., iota)	U+00A8 ¨ DIAERESIS
Less than	A<B	Comparison: 1 if true, 0 if false	U+003C < LESS-THAN SIGN
Less than or equal	A≤B	Comparison: 1 if true, 0 if false	U+2264 ≤ LESS-THAN OR EQUAL TO
Equal	A=B	Comparison: 1 if true, 0 if false	U+003D = EQUALS SIGN
Greater than or equal	A≥B	Comparison: 1 if true, 0 if false	U+2265 ≥ GREATER-THAN OR EQUAL TO
Greater than	A>B	Comparison: 1 if true, 0 if false	U+003E > GREATER-THAN SIGN
Not equal	A≠B	Comparison: 1 if true, 0 if false	U+2260 ≠ NOT EQUAL TO
Or	A∨B	Boolean Logic: 0 (False) if both A and B = 0, 1 otherwise. Alt: 1 (True) if A or B = 1 (True)	U+2228 ∨ LOGICAL OR
And	A∧B	Boolean Logic: 1 (True) if both A and B = 1, 0 (False) otherwise	U+2227 ∧ LOGICAL AND
Nor	A⍱B	Boolean Logic: 1 if both A and B are 0, otherwise 0. Alt: ~∨ = not Or	U+2371 ⍱ APL FUNCTIONAL SYMBOL DOWN CARET TILDE
Nand	A⍲B	Boolean Logic: 0 if both A and B are 1, otherwise 1. Alt: ~∧ = not And	U+2372 ⍲ APL FUNCTIONAL SYMBOL UP CARET TILDE
Left	A⊣B	A	U+22A3 ⊣ LEFT TACK
Right	A⊢B	B	U+22A2 ⊢ RIGHT TACK
Match	A≡B	1 if A matches B exactly with respect to value, shape, and nesting; otherwise 0.	U+2261 ≡ IDENTICAL TO
Laminate	A⍪B	Concatenate along first axis	U+236A ⍪ APL FUNCTIONAL SYMBOL COMMA BAR

== Operators and axis indicator ==
Name(s)	Symbol	Example	Meaning (of example)	Unicode code point sequence
Reduce (last axis), Slash	/	+/B	Sum across B	U+002F / SOLIDUS
Reduce (first axis)	⌿	+⌿B	Sum down B	U+233F ⌿ APL FUNCTIONAL SYMBOL SLASH BAR
Scan (last axis), Backslash	\	+\B	Running sum across B	U+005C \ REVERSE SOLIDUS
Scan (first axis)	⍀	+⍀B	Running sum down B	U+2340 ⍀ APL FUNCTIONAL SYMBOL BACKSLASH BAR
Inner product	.	A+.×B	Matrix product of A and B	U+002E . FULL STOP
Outer product	∘.	A∘.×B	Outer product of A and B	U+2218 ∘ RING OPERATOR, U+002E . FULL STOP

Notes: The reduce and scan operators expect a dyadic function on their left, forming a monadic composite function applied to the vector on its right.

The product operator "." expects a dyadic function on both its left and right, forming a dyadic composite function applied to the vectors on its left and right. If the function to the left of the dot is "∘" (signifying null) then the composite function is an outer product, otherwise it is an inner product. An inner product intended for conventional matrix multiplication uses the + and × functions, replacing these with other dyadic functions can result in useful alternative operations.

Some functions can be followed by an axis indicator in (square) brackets, i.e., this appears between a function and an array and should not be confused with array subscripts written after an array. For example, given the ⌽ (reversal) function and a two-dimensional array, the function by default operates along the last axis but this can be changed using an axis indicator:

        A←4 3⍴⍳12
        A
 1  2  3
 4  5  6
 7  8  9
10 11 12

4 rows by 3 cols matrix created, using rho ⍴ and iota ⍳. The 4 x 3 matrix is then stored in a variable named A. (A will never be mutated in these examples. Refer back to this cell always for the original form of A.)

        ⌽A
 3  2  1
 6  5  4
 9  8  7
12 11 10

A reflected (or "flipped") along its vertical axis as symbol ⌽ visually indicates.

        ⌽[1]A
10 11 12
 7  8  9
 4  5  6
 1  2  3

A reflected using the [1] axis indicator or first dimension modifier. The result is that variable A has been reflected across the horizontal axis, instead of vertically.

        ⊖⌽A
12 11 10
 9  8  7
 6  5  4
 3  2  1

A reflected both vertically ⊖ and horizontally ⌽.

        ⍉A
1 4 7 10
2 5 8 11
3 6 9 12

A ⍉ transposed to a 3 row by 4 col matrix such that rows-cols become exchanged, as symbol ⍉ visually portrays. Compare the result here to the original matrix stored in A, topmost matrix. These types of data transformations are useful in time series analysis and spatial coordinates, just two examples, more exist.

As a particular case, if the dyadic catenate "," function is followed by an axis indicator (or axis modifier to a symbol/function), it can be used to laminate (interpose) two arrays depending on whether the axis indicator is less than or greater than the index origin (index origin = 1 in illustration below):

        B←1 2 3 4
        C←5 6 7 8
        B,C
1 2 3 4 5 6 7 8
        B,[0.5]C
1 2 3 4
5 6 7 8
        B,[1.5]C
1 5
2 6
3 7
4 8

At left, variable 'B' is first assigned a vector of 4 consecutive integers (e.g., ⍳4).
Var C is then assigned 4 more consecutive integers (such as 4+⍳4).
'B' and C are then concatenated or raveled together for illustration purposes,
resulting in a single vector (⍳8). In the particular case at left, if the dyadic catenate "," function is followed by an axis indicator ([0.5] which is less than 1), it can be used to laminate (interpose) two arrays (vectors in this case) depending on whether the axis indicator is less than or greater than the index origin(1). The first result (of B,[0.5]C) is a 2 row by 4 column matrix, vertically joining 'B' and C row-wise. The second result (of B,[1.5]C which is greater than 1) is a 4 row by 2 column matrix.

== Nested arrays ==
Arrays are structures which have elements grouped linearly as vectors or in table form as matrices—and higher dimensions (3D or cubed, 4D or cubed over time, etc.). Arrays containing both characters and numbers are termed mixed arrays. Array structures containing elements which are also arrays are called nested arrays.

Creating a nested array
User session with APL interpreter
Explanation

      X←4 5⍴⍳20
      X
 1  2  3  4  5
 6  7  8  9 10
11 12 13 14 15
16 17 18 19 20
      X[2;2]
7
      ⎕IO
1
      X[1;1]
1

X set = to matrix with 4 rows by 5 columns, consisting of 20 consecutive integers.

Element X[2;2] in row 2 - column 2 currently is an integer = 7.

Initial index origin ⎕IO value = 1.

Thus, the first element in matrix X or X[1;1] = 1.

      X[2;2]←⊂"Text"
      X[3;4]←⊂(2 2⍴⍳4)
      X
  1    2  3      4    5
  6 Text  8      9   10

 11   12 13    1 2   15
               3 4

 16   17 18     19   20

Element in X[row 2; col 2] is changed (from 7) to a nested vector "Text" using the enclose ⊂ function.

Element in X[row 3; col 4], formerly integer 14, now becomes a mini enclosed or ⊂ nested 2x2 matrix of 4 consecutive integers.

Since X contains numbers, text and nested elements, it is both a mixed and a nested array.

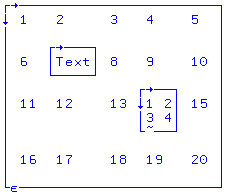
Visual representation of the nested array

== Flow control ==
A user may define custom functions which, like variables, are identified by name rather than by a non-textual symbol. The function header defines whether a custom function is niladic (no arguments), monadic (one right argument) or dyadic (left and right arguments), the local name of the result (to the left of the ← assign arrow), and whether it has any local variables (each separated by semicolon ';').

User functions
Niladic function PI or π(pi)

 ∇ RESULT←PI
   RESULT←○1
 ∇

Monadic function CIRCLEAREA

 ∇ AREA←CIRCLEAREA RADIUS
   AREA←PI×RADIUS⋆2
 ∇

Dyadic function SEGMENTAREA, with local variables

 ∇ AREA←DEGREES SEGMENTAREA RADIUS ; FRACTION ; CA
   FRACTION←DEGREES÷360
   CA←CIRCLEAREA RADIUS
   AREA←FRACTION×CA
 ∇

Whether functions with the same identifier but different adicity are distinct is implementation-defined. If allowed, then a function CURVEAREA could be defined twice to replace both monadic CIRCLEAREA and dyadic SEGMENTAREA above, with the monadic or dyadic function being selected by the context in which it was referenced.

Custom dyadic functions may usually be applied to parameters with the same conventions as built-in functions, i.e., arrays should either have the same number of elements or one of them should have a single element which is extended. There are exceptions to this, for example a function to convert pre-decimal UK currency to dollars would expect to take a parameter with precisely three elements representing pounds, shillings and pence.

Inside a program or a custom function, control may be conditionally transferred to a statement identified by a line number or explicit label; if the target is 0 (zero) this terminates the program or returns to a function's caller. The most common form uses the APL compression function, as in the template (condition)/target which has the effect of evaluating the condition to 0 (false) or 1 (true) and then using that to mask the target (if the condition is false it is ignored, if true it is left alone so control is transferred).

Hence function SEGMENTAREA may be modified to abort (just below), returning zero if the parameters (DEGREES and RADIUS below) are of different sign:

∇ AREA←DEGREES SEGMENTAREA RADIUS ; FRACTION ; CA ; SIGN     ⍝ local variables denoted by semicolon(;)
  FRACTION←DEGREES÷360
  CA←CIRCLEAREA RADIUS        ⍝ this APL code statement calls user function CIRCLEAREA, defined up above.
  SIGN←(×DEGREES)≠×RADIUS     ⍝ << APL logic TEST/determine whether DEGREES and RADIUS do NOT (≠ used) have same SIGN 1-yes different(≠), 0-no(same sign)
  AREA←0                      ⍝ default value of AREA set = zero
  →SIGN/0                     ⍝ branching(here, exiting) occurs when SIGN=1 while SIGN=0 does NOT branch to 0.  Branching to 0 exits function.
  AREA←FRACTION×CA
∇

The above function SEGMENTAREA works as expected if the parameters are scalars or single-element arrays, but not if they are multiple-element arrays since the condition ends up being based on a single element of the SIGN array - on the other hand, the user function could be modified to correctly handle vectorized arguments. Operation can sometimes be unpredictable since APL defines that computers with vector-processing capabilities should parallelise and may reorder array operations as far as possible - thus, test and debug user functions particularly if they will be used with vector or even matrix arguments. This affects not only explicit application of a custom function to arrays, but also its use anywhere that a dyadic function may reasonably be used such as in generation of a table of results:

        90 180 270 ¯90 ∘.SEGMENTAREA 1 ¯2 4
0 0 0
0 0 0
0 0 0
0 0 0

A more concise way and sometimes better way - to formulate a function is to avoid explicit transfers of control, instead using expressions which evaluate correctly in all or the expected conditions. Sometimes it is correct to let a function fail when one or both input arguments are incorrect - precisely to let user know that one or both arguments used were incorrect. The following is more concise than the above SEGMENTAREA function. The below importantly correctly handles vectorized arguments:

 ∇ AREA←DEGREES SEGMENTAREA RADIUS ; FRACTION ; CA ; SIGN
   FRACTION←DEGREES÷360
   CA←CIRCLEAREA RADIUS
   SIGN←(×DEGREES)≠×RADIUS
   AREA←FRACTION×CA×~SIGN  ⍝ this APL statement is more complex, as a one-liner - but it solves vectorized arguments: a tradeoff - complexity vs. branching
 ∇

        90 180 270 ¯90 ∘.SEGMENTAREA 1 ¯2 4
0.785398163 0           12.5663706
1.57079633  0           25.1327412
2.35619449  0           37.6991118
0           ¯3.14159265 0

Avoiding explicit transfers of control also called branching, if not reviewed or carefully controlled - can promote use of excessively complex one liners, veritably "misunderstood and complex idioms" and a "write-only" style, which has done little to endear APL to influential commentators such as Edsger Dijkstra. Conversely however APL idioms can be fun, educational and useful - if used with helpful comments ⍝, for example including source and intended meaning and function of the idiom(s). Here is an APL idioms list, an IBM APL2 idioms list here and Finnish APL idiom library here.

== Miscellaneous ==
Miscellaneous symbols
Name(s)	Symbol	Example	Meaning (of example)	Unicode code point
High minus	¯	¯3	Denotes a negative number	U+00AF ¯ MACRON
Lamp, Comment	⍝	⍝This is a comment	Everything to the right of ⍝ denotes a comment	U+235D ⍝ APL FUNCTIONAL SYMBOL UP SHOE JOT
RightArrow, Branch, GoTo	→	→This_Label	→This_Label sends APL execution to This_Label:	U+2192 → RIGHTWARDS ARROW
Assign, LeftArrow, Set to	←	B←A	B←A sets values and shape of B to match A	U+2190 ← LEFTWARDS ARROW

Most APL implementations support a number of system variables and functions, usually preceded by the ⎕ (quad) and/or ")" (hook=close parenthesis) character. Note that the quad character is not the same as the Unicode missing character symbol. Particularly important and widely implemented is the ⎕IO (Index Origin) variable, since while the original IBM APL based its arrays on 1 some newer variants base them on zero:

User session with APL interpreter	Description
X←⍳12         X 1 2 3 4 5 6 7 8 9 10 11 12         ⎕IO 1         X[1] 1	X set = to vector of 12 consecutive integers. Initial index origin ⎕IO value = 1. Thus, the first position in vector X or X[1] = 1 per vector of iota values {1 2 3 4 5 ...}.
⎕IO←0         X[1] 2         X[0] 1	Index Origin ⎕IO now changed to 0. Thus, the 'first index position' in vector X changes from 1 to 0. Consequently, X[1] then references or points to 2 from {1 2 3 4 5 ...} and X[0] now references 1.
⎕WA 41226371072	Quad WA or ⎕WA, another dynamic system variable, shows how much Work Area remains unused or 41,226 megabytes or about 41 gigabytes of unused additional total free work area available for the APL workspace and program to process using. If this number gets low or approaches zero - the computer may need more random-access memory (RAM), hard disk drive space or some combination of the two to increase virtual memory.
)VARS X	)VARS a system function in APL, )VARS shows user variable names existing in the current workspace.

There are also system functions available to users for saving the current workspace e.g., )SAVE and terminating the APL environment, e.g., )OFF - sometimes called hook commands or functions due to the use of a leading right parenthesis or hook. There is some standardization of these quad and hook functions.

== Fonts ==
The Unicode Basic Multilingual Plane includes the APL symbols in the Miscellaneous Technical block, which are thus usually rendered accurately from the larger Unicode fonts installed with most modern operating systems. These fonts are rarely designed by typographers familiar with APL glyphs. So, while accurate, the glyphs may look unfamiliar to APL programmers or be difficult to distinguish from one another.

Some Unicode fonts have been designed to display APL well: APLX Upright, APL385 Unicode, and SimPL.

Before Unicode, APL interpreters were supplied with fonts in which APL characters were mapped to less commonly used positions in the ASCII character sets, usually in the upper 128 code points. These mappings (and their national variations) were sometimes unique to each APL vendor's interpreter, which made the display of APL programs on the Web, in text files and manuals - frequently problematic.

== APL2 keyboard function to symbol mapping ==
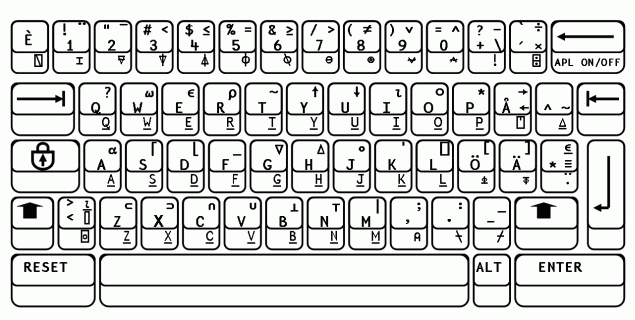
APL2 Keyboard

Note the APL On/Off Key - topmost-rightmost key, just below. Also note the keyboard had some 55 unique (68 listed per tables above, including comparative symbols but several symbols appear in both monadic and dyadic tables) APL symbol keys (55 APL functions (operators) are listed in IBM's 5110 APL Reference Manual), thus with the use of alt, shift and ctrl keys - it would theoretically have allowed a maximum of some 59 (keys) *4 (with 2-key pressing) *3 (with tri-key pressing, e.g., ctrl-alt-del) or some 472 different maximum key combinations, approaching the 512 EBCDIC character max (256 chars times 2 codes for each keys-combination). Again, in theory the keyboard pictured here would have allowed for about 472 different APL symbols/functions to be keyboard-input, actively used. In practice, early versions were only using something roughly equivalent to 55 APL special symbols (excluding letters, numbers, punctuation, etc. keys). Thus, early APL was then only using about 11% (55/472) of a symbolic language's at-that-time utilization potential, based on keyboard # keys limits, again excluding numbers, letters, punctuation, etc. In another sense keyboard symbols utilization was closer to 100%, highly efficient, since EBCDIC only allowed 256 distinct chars, and ASCII only 128.

== Solving puzzles ==
APL has proved to be extremely useful in solving mathematical puzzles, several of which are described below.

=== Pascal's triangle ===
Take Pascal's triangle, which is a triangular array of numbers in which those at the ends of the rows are 1 and each of the other numbers is the sum of the nearest two numbers in the row just above it (the apex, 1, being at the top). The following is an APL one-liner function to visually depict Pascal's triangle:

      Pascal ← {' '@(0=⊢)↑0,⍨¨a⌽¨⌽∊¨0,¨¨a∘!¨a←⌽⍳⍵} ⍝ Create a one-line user function called Pascal
      Pascal 7                            ⍝ Run function Pascal for seven rows and show the results below:
                     1                       
                 1       2                   
             1       3       3               
          1      4       6       4           
       1     5       10      10      5       
    1     6      15      20      15      6   
 1     7     21      35      35      21     7

=== Prime numbers, contra proof via factors ===
Determine the number of prime numbers (prime # is a natural number greater than 1 that has no positive divisors other than 1 and itself) up to some number N. Ken Iverson is credited with the following one-liner APL solution to the problem:

      ⎕CR 'PrimeNumbers'  ⍝ Show APL user-function PrimeNumbers
Primes←PrimeNumbers N     ⍝ Function takes one right arg N (e.g., show prime numbers for 1 ... int N)
Primes←(2=+⌿0=(⍳N)∘.|⍳N)/⍳N  ⍝ The Ken Iverson one-liner
      PrimeNumbers 100    ⍝ Show all prime numbers from 1 to 100
2 3 5 7 11 13 17 19 23 29 31 37 41 43 47 53 59 61 67 71 73 79 83 89 97
      ⍴PrimeNumbers 100
25                       ⍝ There are twenty-five prime numbers in the range up to 100.

Examining the converse or opposite of a mathematical solution is frequently needed (integer factors of a number): Prove for the subset of integers from 1 through 15 that they are non-prime by listing their decomposition factors. What are their non-one factors (#'s divisible by, except 1)?

      ⎕CR 'ProveNonPrime'
Z←ProveNonPrime R
⍝Show all factors of an integer R - except 1 and the number itself,
⍝ i.e., prove Non-Prime. String 'prime' is returned for a Prime integer.
Z←(0=(⍳R)|R)/⍳R  ⍝ Determine all factors for integer R, store into Z
Z←(~(Z∊1,R))/Z   ⍝ Delete 1 and the number as factors for the number from Z.
→(0=⍴Z)/ProveNonPrimeIsPrime               ⍝ If result has zero shape, it has no other factors and is therefore prime
Z←R,(⊂" factors(except 1) "),(⊂Z),⎕TCNL  ⍝ Show the number R, its factors(except 1,itself), and a new line char
→0  ⍝ Done with function if non-prime
ProveNonPrimeIsPrime: Z←R,(⊂" prime"),⎕TCNL  ⍝ function branches here if number was prime

      ProveNonPrime ¨⍳15      ⍝ Prove non-primes for each(¨) of the integers from 1 through 15 (iota 15)
    1  prime
    2  prime
    3  prime
    4  factors(except 1)   2 
    5  prime
    6  factors(except 1)   2 3 
    7  prime
    8  factors(except 1)   2 4 
    9  factors(except 1)   3 
    10  factors(except 1)   2 5 
    11  prime
    12  factors(except 1)   2 3 4 6 
    13  prime
    14  factors(except 1)   2 7 
    15  factors(except 1)   3 5

=== Fibonacci sequence ===
Generate a Fibonacci number sequence, where each subsequent number in the sequence is the sum of the prior two:

      ⎕CR 'Fibonacci'              ⍝ Display function Fibonacci
FibonacciNum←Fibonacci Nth;IOwas   ⍝ Funct header, funct name=Fibonacci, monadic funct with 1 right hand arg Nth;local var IOwas, and a returned num.
⍝Generate a Fibonacci sequenced number where Nth is the position # of the Fibonacci number in the sequence.  << function description
IOwas←⎕IO ⋄ ⎕IO←0 ⋄ FibonacciNum←↑0 1↓↑+.×/Nth/⊂2 2⍴1 1 1 0 ⋄ ⎕IO←IOwas   ⍝ In order for this function to work correctly ⎕IO must be set to zero.

      Fibonacci¨⍳14    ⍝ This APL statement says: Generate the Fibonacci sequence over each(¨) integer number(iota or ⍳) for the integers 1..14.
0 1 1 2 3 5 8 13 21 34 55 89 144 233   ⍝ Generated sequence, i.e., the Fibonacci sequence of numbers generated by APL's interpreter.

== See also ==
- Miscellaneous Technical – Unicode block including APL keys
- APL (codepage) § Keyboard layout – More modern APL keyboard layout information
