= Miscellaneous Technical =

Unicode character block

- Range: U+2300..U+23FF (256 code points)
- Plane: BMP
- Scripts: Common
- Symbol sets: Technical; APL symbols Dentistry notation
- Assigned: 256 code points
- Unused: 0 reserved code points 2 deprecated
- Source standards: ISO 2047, ISO 9995-7

Unicode Version History
- 1.0.0 (1991): 45 (+45)
- 1.0.1 (1992): 43 (−2)
- 1.1 (1993): 122 (+79)
- 3.0 (1999): 154 (+32)
- 3.2 (2002): 207 (+53)
- 4.0 (2003): 209 (+2)
- 4.1 (2005): 220 (+11)
- 5.0 (2006): 232 (+12)
- 5.2 (2009): 233 (+1)
- 6.0 (2010): 244 (+11)
- 7.0 (2014): 251 (+7)
- 9.0 (2016): 255 (+4)
- 10.0 (2017): 256 (+1)

Unicode documentation
- Code chart ∣ Web page
- Note: Two characters were removed from the Miscellaneous Technical block in version 1.0.1 during the process of unifying with ISO 10646.

Miscellaneous Technical is a Unicode block ranging from U+2300 to U+23FF. It contains various common symbols which are related to and used in the various technical, programming language, and academic professions. For example:

- Symbol ⌂ (HTML hexadecimal code is &#x2302;) represents a house or a home.
- Symbol ⌘ (&#x2318;) is a "place of interest" sign. It may be used to represent the Command key on a Mac keyboard.
- Symbol ⌚ (&#x231A;) is a watch (or clock).
- Symbol ⏏ (&#x23CF;) is the "Eject" button symbol found on electronic equipment.
- Symbol ⏚ (&#x23DA;) is the "Earth Ground" symbol found on electrical or electronic manual, tag and equipment.

It also includes most of the uncommon symbols used by the APL programming language.

== Miscellaneous Technical (2300–23FF) in Unicode ==
In Unicode, Miscellaneous Technical symbols placed in the hexadecimal range 0x2300–0x23FF, (decimal 8960–9215), as described below.

=== (2300–233F) ===
2300		2310		2320		2330		
Symbol	Name	Symbol	Name	Symbol	Name	Symbol	Name	Last Hex#
HTML Hex	Name	HTML Hex	Name	HTML Hex	Name	HTML Hex	Name	Last Hex#
Dec	Picture	Dec	Picture	Dec	Picture	Dec	Picture	Last Hex#
⌀	DIAMETER SIGN	⌐	REVERSED NOT SIGN	⌠	TOP HALF INTEGRAL	⌰	TOTAL RUNOUT	0
&#x2300;	DIAMETER SIGN	&#x2310;	REVERSED NOT SIGN	&#x2320;	TOP HALF INTEGRAL	&#x2330;	TOTAL RUNOUT	0
&#8960;		&#8976;		&#8992;		&#9008;		0
⌁	ELECTRIC ARROW	⌑	SQUARE LOZENGE	⌡	BOTTOM HALF INTEGRAL	⌱	DIMENSION ORIGIN	1
&#x2301;	ELECTRIC ARROW	&#x2311;	SQUARE LOZENGE	&#x2321;	BOTTOM HALF INTEGRAL	&#x2331;	DIMENSION ORIGIN	1
&#8961;		&#8977;		&#8993;		&#9009;		1
⌂	HOUSE	⌒	ARC	⌢	FROWN	⌲	CONICAL TAPER	2
&#x2302;	HOUSE	&#x2312;	ARC	&#x2322;	FROWN	&#x2332;	CONICAL TAPER	2
&#8962;		&#8978;		&#8994;		&#9010;		2
⌃	UP ARROWHEAD	⌓	SEGMENT	⌣	SMILE	⌳	SLOPE	3
&#x2303;	UP ARROWHEAD	&#x2313;	SEGMENT	&#x2323;	SMILE	&#x2333;	SLOPE	3
&#8963;		&#8979;		&#8995;		&#9011;		3
⌄	DOWN ARROWHEAD	⌔	SECTOR	⌤	UP ARROWHEAD BETWEEN TWO HORIZONTAL BARS	⌴	COUNTERBORE	4
&#x2304;	DOWN ARROWHEAD	&#x2314;	SECTOR	&#x2324;	UP ARROWHEAD BETWEEN TWO HORIZONTAL BARS	&#x2334;	COUNTERBORE	4
&#8964;		&#8980;		&#8996;		&#9012;		4
⌅	PROJECTIVE	⌕	TELEPHONE RECORDER	⌥	OPTION KEY	⌵	COUNTERSINK	5
&#x2305;	PROJECTIVE	&#x2315;	TELEPHONE RECORDER	&#x2325;	OPTION KEY	&#x2335;	COUNTERSINK	5
&#8965;		&#8981;		&#8997;		&#9013;		5
⌆	PERSPECTIVE	⌖	POSITION INDICATOR	⌦	ERASE TO THE RIGHT	⌶	APL FUNCTIONAL SYMBOL I-BEAM	6
&#x2306;	PERSPECTIVE	&#x2316;	POSITION INDICATOR	&#x2326;	ERASE TO THE RIGHT	&#x2336;	APL FUNCTIONAL SYMBOL I-BEAM	6
&#8966;		&#8982;		&#8998;		&#9014;		6
⌇	WAVY LINE	⌗	VIEWDATA SQUARE (Note: Substituted for the underscore in viewdata/teletext displays.)	⌧	X IN A RECTANGLE BOX	⌷	APL FUNCTIONAL SYMBOL SQUISH QUAD	7
&#x2307;	WAVY LINE	&#x2317;	VIEWDATA SQUARE	&#x2327;	X IN A RECTANGLE BOX	&#x2337;	APL FUNCTIONAL SYMBOL SQUISH QUAD	7
&#8967;		&#8983;		&#8999;		&#9015;		7
⌈	LEFT CEILING	⌘	PLACE OF INTEREST SIGN	⌨	KEYBOARD	⌸	APL FUNCTIONAL SYMBOL QUAD EQUAL	8
&#x2308;	LEFT CEILING	&#x2318;	PLACE OF INTEREST SIGN	&#x2328;	KEYBOARD	&#x2338;	APL FUNCTIONAL SYMBOL QUAD EQUAL	8
&#8968;		&#8984;		&#9000;		&#9016;		8
⌉	RIGHT CEILING	⌙	TURNED NOT SIGN	〈	LEFT-POINTING ANGLE BRACKET	⌹	APL FUNCTIONAL SYMBOL QUAD DIVIDE	9
&#x2309;	RIGHT CEILING	&#x2319;	TURNED NOT SIGN	&#x2329;	LEFT-POINTING ANGLE BRACKET	&#x2339;	APL FUNCTIONAL SYMBOL QUAD DIVIDE	9
&#8969;		&#8985;		&#9001;		&#9017;		9
⌊	LEFT FLOOR	⌚	WATCH	〉	RIGHT-POINTING ANGLE BRACKET	⌺	APL FUNCTIONAL SYMBOL QUAD DIAMOND	A
&#x230A;	LEFT FLOOR	&#x231A;	WATCH	&#x232A;	RIGHT-POINTING ANGLE BRACKET	&#x233A;	APL FUNCTIONAL SYMBOL QUAD DIAMOND	A
&#8970;		&#8986;		&#9002;		&#9018;		A
⌋	RIGHT FLOOR	⌛	HOURGLASS	⌫	ERASE TO THE LEFT	⌻	APL FUNCTIONAL SYMBOL QUAD JOT	B
&#x230B;	RIGHT FLOOR	&#x231B;	HOURGLASS	&#x232B;	ERASE TO THE LEFT	&#x233B;	APL FUNCTIONAL SYMBOL QUAD JOT	B
&#8971;		&#8987;		&#9003;		&#9019;		B
⌌	BOTTOM RIGHT CROP	⌜	TOP LEFT CORNER	⌬	BENZENE RING	⌼	APL FUNCTIONAL SYMBOL QUAD CIRCLE	C
&#x230C;	BOTTOM RIGHT CROP	&#x231C;	TOP LEFT CORNER	&#x232C;	BENZENE RING	&#x233C;	APL FUNCTIONAL SYMBOL QUAD CIRCLE	C
&#8972;		&#8988;		&#9004;		&#9020;		C
⌍	BOTTOM LEFT CROP	⌝	TOP RIGHT CORNER	⌭	CYLINDRICITY	⌽	APL FUNCTIONAL SYMBOL CIRCLE STILE	D
&#x230D;	BOTTOM LEFT CROP	&#x231D;	TOP RIGHT CORNER	&#x232D;	CYLINDRICITY	&#x233D;	APL FUNCTIONAL SYMBOL CIRCLE STILE	D
&#8973;		&#8989;		&#9005;		&#9021;		D
⌎	TOP RIGHT CROP	⌞	BOTTOM LEFT CORNER	⌮	ALL AROUND-PROFILE	⌾	APL FUNCTIONAL SYMBOL CIRCLE JOT	E
&#x230E;	TOP RIGHT CROP	&#x231E;	BOTTOM LEFT CORNER	&#x232E;	ALL AROUND-PROFILE	&#x233E;	APL FUNCTIONAL SYMBOL CIRCLE JOT	E
&#8974;		&#8990;		&#9006;		&#9022;		E
⌏	TOP LEFT CROP	⌟	BOTTOM RIGHT CORNER	⌯	SYMMETRY	⌿	APL FUNCTIONAL SYMBOL SLASH BAR	F
&#x230F;	TOP LEFT CROP	&#x231F;	BOTTOM RIGHT CORNER	&#x232F;	SYMMETRY	&#x233F;	APL FUNCTIONAL SYMBOL SLASH BAR	F
&#8975;		&#8991;		&#9007;		&#9023;		F
2300		2310		2320		2330		

1.Unicode code points U+2329 & U+232A are deprecated.

=== (2340–237F) ===
2340		2350		2360		2370		
Symbol	Name	Symbol	Name	Symbol	Name	Symbol	Name	Last Hex#
HTML Hex	Name	HTML Hex	Name	HTML Hex	Name	HTML Hex	Name	Last Hex#
Dec	Picture	Dec	Picture	Dec	Picture	Dec	Picture	Last Hex#
⍀	APL FUNCTIONAL SYMBOL BACKSLASH BAR	⍐	APL FUNCTIONAL SYMBOL QUAD UPWARDS ARROW	⍠	APL FUNCTIONAL SYMBOL QUAD COLON	⍰	APL FUNCTIONAL SYMBOL QUAD QUESTION	0
&#x2340;	APL FUNCTIONAL SYMBOL BACKSLASH BAR	&#x2350;	APL FUNCTIONAL SYMBOL QUAD UPWARDS ARROW	&#x2360;	APL FUNCTIONAL SYMBOL QUAD COLON	&#x2370;	APL FUNCTIONAL SYMBOL QUAD QUESTION	0
&#9024;		&#9040;		&#9056;		&#9072;		0
⍁	APL FUNCTIONAL SYMBOL QUAD SLASH	⍑	APL FUNCTIONAL SYMBOL UP TACK OVERBAR	⍡	APL FUNCTIONAL SYMBOL UP TACK DIAERESIS	⍱	APL FUNCTIONAL SYMBOL DOWN CARET TILDE	1
&#x2341;	APL FUNCTIONAL SYMBOL QUAD SLASH	&#x2351;	APL FUNCTIONAL SYMBOL UP TACK OVERBAR	&#x2361;	APL FUNCTIONAL SYMBOL UP TACK DIAERESIS	&#x2371;	APL FUNCTIONAL SYMBOL DOWN CARET TILDE	1
&#9025;		&#9041;		&#9057;		&#9073;		1
⍂	APL FUNCTIONAL SYMBOL QUAD BACKSLASH	⍒	APL FUNCTIONAL SYMBOL DEL STILE	⍢	APL FUNCTIONAL SYMBOL DEL DIAERESIS	⍲	APL FUNCTIONAL SYMBOL UP CARET TILDE	2
&#x2342;	APL FUNCTIONAL SYMBOL QUAD BACKSLASH	&#x2352;	APL FUNCTIONAL SYMBOL DEL STILE	&#x2362;	APL FUNCTIONAL SYMBOL DEL DIAERESIS	&#x2372;	APL FUNCTIONAL SYMBOL UP CARET TILDE	2
&#9026;		&#9042;		&#9058;		&#9074;		2
⍃	APL FUNCTIONAL SYMBOL QUAD LESS-THAN	⍓	APL FUNCTIONAL SYMBOL QUAD UP CARET	⍣	APL FUNCTIONAL SYMBOL STAR DIAERESIS	⍳	APL FUNCTIONAL SYMBOL IOTA	3
&#x2343;	APL FUNCTIONAL SYMBOL QUAD LESS-THAN	&#x2353;	APL FUNCTIONAL SYMBOL QUAD UP CARET	&#x2363;	APL FUNCTIONAL SYMBOL STAR DIAERESIS	&#x2373;	APL FUNCTIONAL SYMBOL IOTA	3
&#9027;		&#9043;		&#9059;		&#9075;		3
⍄	APL FUNCTIONAL SYMBOL QUAD GREATER-THAN	⍔	APL FUNCTIONAL SYMBOL QUAD DEL	⍤	APL FUNCTIONAL SYMBOL JOT DIAERESIS	⍴	APL FUNCTIONAL SYMBOL RHO	4
&#x2344;	APL FUNCTIONAL SYMBOL QUAD GREATER-THAN	&#x2354;	APL FUNCTIONAL SYMBOL QUAD DEL	&#x2364;	APL FUNCTIONAL SYMBOL JOT DIAERESIS	&#x2374;	APL FUNCTIONAL SYMBOL RHO	4
&#9028;		&#9044;		&#9060;		&#9076;		4
⍅	APL FUNCTIONAL SYMBOL LEFTWARDS VANE	⍕	APL FUNCTIONAL SYMBOL UP TACK JOT	⍥	APL FUNCTIONAL SYMBOL CIRCLE DIAERESIS	⍵	APL FUNCTIONAL SYMBOL OMEGA	5
&#x2345;	APL FUNCTIONAL SYMBOL LEFTWARDS VANE	&#x2355;	APL FUNCTIONAL SYMBOL UP TACK JOT	&#x2365;	APL FUNCTIONAL SYMBOL CIRCLE DIAERESIS	&#x2375;	APL FUNCTIONAL SYMBOL OMEGA	5
&#9029;		&#9045;		&#9061;		&#9077;		5
⍆	APL FUNCTIONAL SYMBOL RIGHTWARDS VANE	⍖	APL FUNCTIONAL SYMBOL DOWNWARDS VANE	⍦	APL FUNCTIONAL SYMBOL DOWN SHOE STILE	⍶	APL FUNCTIONAL SYMBOL ALPHA UNDERBAR	6
&#x2346;	APL FUNCTIONAL SYMBOL RIGHTWARDS VANE	&#x2356;	APL FUNCTIONAL SYMBOL DOWNWARDS VANE	&#x2366;	APL FUNCTIONAL SYMBOL DOWN SHOE STILE	&#x2376;	APL FUNCTIONAL SYMBOL ALPHA UNDERBAR	6
&#9030;		&#9046;		&#9062;		&#9078;		6
⍇	APL FUNCTIONAL SYMBOL QUAD LEFTWARDS ARROW	⍗	APL FUNCTIONAL SYMBOL QUAD DOWNWARDS ARROW	⍧	APL FUNCTIONAL SYMBOL LEFT SHOE STILE	⍷	APL FUNCTIONAL SYMBOL EPSILON UNDERBAR	7
&#x2347;	APL FUNCTIONAL SYMBOL QUAD LEFTWARDS ARROW	&#x2357;	APL FUNCTIONAL SYMBOL QUAD DOWNWARDS ARROW	&#x2367;	APL FUNCTIONAL SYMBOL LEFT SHOE STILE	&#x2377;	APL FUNCTIONAL SYMBOL EPSILON UNDERBAR	7
&#9031;		&#9047;		&#9063;		&#9079;		7
⍈	APL FUNCTIONAL SYMBOL QUAD RIGHTWARDS ARROW	⍘	APL FUNCTIONAL SYMBOL QUOTE UNDERBAR	⍨	APL FUNCTIONAL SYMBOL TILDE DIAERESIS	⍸	APL FUNCTIONAL SYMBOL IOTA UNDERBAR	8
&#x2348;	APL FUNCTIONAL SYMBOL QUAD RIGHTWARDS ARROW	&#x2358;	APL FUNCTIONAL SYMBOL QUOTE UNDERBAR	&#x2368;	APL FUNCTIONAL SYMBOL TILDE DIAERESIS	&#x2378;	APL FUNCTIONAL SYMBOL IOTA UNDERBAR	8
&#9032;		&#9048;		&#9064;		&#9080;		8
⍉	APL FUNCTIONAL SYMBOL CIRCLE BACKSLASH	⍙	APL FUNCTIONAL SYMBOL DELTA UNDERBAR	⍩	APL FUNCTIONAL SYMBOL GREATER-THAN DIAERESIS	⍹	APL FUNCTIONAL SYMBOL OMEGA UNDERBAR	9
&#x2349;	APL FUNCTIONAL SYMBOL CIRCLE BACKSLASH	&#x2359;	APL FUNCTIONAL SYMBOL DELTA UNDERBAR	&#x2369;	APL FUNCTIONAL SYMBOL GREATER-THAN DIAERESIS	&#x2379;	APL FUNCTIONAL SYMBOL OMEGA UNDERBAR	9
&#9033;		&#9049;		&#9065;		&#9081;		9
⍊	APL FUNCTIONAL SYMBOL DOWN TACK UNDERBAR	⍚	APL FUNCTIONAL SYMBOL DIAMOND UNDERBAR	⍪	APL FUNCTIONAL SYMBOL COMMA BAR	⍺	APL FUNCTIONAL SYMBOL ALPHA	A
&#x234A;	APL FUNCTIONAL SYMBOL DOWN TACK UNDERBAR	&#x235A;	APL FUNCTIONAL SYMBOL DIAMOND UNDERBAR	&#x236A;	APL FUNCTIONAL SYMBOL COMMA BAR	&#x237A;	APL FUNCTIONAL SYMBOL ALPHA	A
&#9034;		&#9050;		&#9066;		&#9082;		A
⍋	APL FUNCTIONAL SYMBOL DELTA STILE	⍛	APL FUNCTIONAL SYMBOL JOT UNDERBAR	⍫	APL FUNCTIONAL SYMBOL DEL TILDE	⍻	NOT CHECK MARK	B
&#x234B;	APL FUNCTIONAL SYMBOL DELTA STILE	&#x235B;	APL FUNCTIONAL SYMBOL JOT UNDERBAR	&#x236B;	APL FUNCTIONAL SYMBOL DEL TILDE	&#x237B;	NOT CHECK MARK	B
&#9035;		&#9051;		&#9067;		&#9083;		B
⍌	APL FUNCTIONAL SYMBOL QUAD DOWN CARET	⍜	APL FUNCTIONAL SYMBOL CIRCLE UNDERBAR	⍬	APL FUNCTIONAL SYMBOL ZILDE	⍼	RIGHT ANGLE WITH DOWNWARDS ZIGZAG ARROW. It is unknown what this sign is meant to be used for.	C
&#x234C;	APL FUNCTIONAL SYMBOL QUAD DOWN CARET	&#x235C;	APL FUNCTIONAL SYMBOL CIRCLE UNDERBAR	&#x236C;	APL FUNCTIONAL SYMBOL ZILDE	&#x237C;	RIGHT ANGLE WITH DOWNWARDS ZIGZAG ARROW. It is unknown what this sign is meant to be used for.	C
&#9036;		&#9052;		&#9068;		&#9084;		C
⍍	APL FUNCTIONAL SYMBOL QUAD DELTA	⍝	APL FUNCTIONAL SYMBOL UP SHOE JOT	⍭	APL FUNCTIONAL SYMBOL STILE TILDE	⍽	SHOULDERED OPEN BOX	D
&#x234D;	APL FUNCTIONAL SYMBOL QUAD DELTA	&#x235D;	APL FUNCTIONAL SYMBOL UP SHOE JOT	&#x236D;	APL FUNCTIONAL SYMBOL STILE TILDE	&#x237D;	SHOULDERED OPEN BOX	D
&#9037;		&#9053;		&#9069;		&#9085;		D
⍎	APL FUNCTIONAL SYMBOL DOWN TACK JOT	⍞	APL FUNCTIONAL SYMBOL QUOTE QUAD	⍮	APL FUNCTIONAL SYMBOL SEMICOLON UNDERBAR	⍾	BELL SYMBOL	E
&#x234E;	APL FUNCTIONAL SYMBOL DOWN TACK JOT	&#x235E;	APL FUNCTIONAL SYMBOL QUOTE QUAD	&#x236E;	APL FUNCTIONAL SYMBOL SEMICOLON UNDERBAR	&#x237E;	BELL SYMBOL	E
&#9038;		&#9054;		&#9070;		&#9086;		E
⍏	APL FUNCTIONAL SYMBOL UPWARDS VANE	⍟	APL FUNCTIONAL SYMBOL CIRCLE STAR	⍯	APL FUNCTIONAL SYMBOL QUAD NOT EQUAL	⍿	VERTICAL LINE WITH MIDDLE DOT	F
&#x234F;	APL FUNCTIONAL SYMBOL UPWARDS VANE	&#x235F;	APL FUNCTIONAL SYMBOL CIRCLE STAR	&#x236F;	APL FUNCTIONAL SYMBOL QUAD NOT EQUAL	&#x237F;	VERTICAL LINE WITH MIDDLE DOT	F
&#9039;		&#9055;		&#9071;		&#9087;		F
2340		2350		2360		2370		

=== (2380–23BF) ===
2380		2390		23A0		23B0		
Symbol	Name	Symbol	Name	Symbol	Name	Symbol	Name	Last Hex#
HTML Hex	Name	HTML Hex	Name	HTML Hex	Name	HTML Hex	Name	Last Hex#
Dec	Picture	Dec	Picture	Dec	Picture	Dec	Picture	Last Hex#
⎀	INSERTION SYMBOL	⎐	OPEN-CIRCUIT-OUTPUT L-TYPE SYMBOL	⎠	RIGHT PARENTHESIS LOWER HOOK	⎰	UPPER LEFT OR LOWER RIGHT CURLY BRACKET SECTION	0
&#x2380;	INSERTION SYMBOL	&#x2390;	OPEN-CIRCUIT-OUTPUT L-TYPE SYMBOL	&#x23A0;	RIGHT PARENTHESIS LOWER HOOK	&#x23B0;	UPPER LEFT OR LOWER RIGHT CURLY BRACKET SECTION	0
&#9088;		&#9104;		&#9120;		&#9136;		0
⎁	CONTINUOUS UNDERLINE SYMBOL	⎑	PASSIVE-PULL-DOWN-OUTPUT SYMBOL	⎡	LEFT SQUARE BRACKET UPPER CORNER	⎱	UPPER RIGHT OR LOWER LEFT CURLY BRACKET SECTION	1
&#x2381;	CONTINUOUS UNDERLINE SYMBOL	&#x2391;	PASSIVE-PULL-DOWN-OUTPUT SYMBOL	&#x23A1;	LEFT SQUARE BRACKET UPPER CORNER	&#x23B1;	UPPER RIGHT OR LOWER LEFT CURLY BRACKET SECTION	1
&#9089;		&#9105;		&#9121;		&#9137;		1
⎂	DISCONTINUOUS UNDERLINE SYMBOL	⎒	PASSIVE-PULL-UP-OUTPUT SYMBOL	⎢	LEFT SQUARE BRACKET EXTENSION	⎲	SUMMATION TOP	2
&#x2382;	DISCONTINUOUS UNDERLINE SYMBOL	&#x2392;	PASSIVE-PULL-UP-OUTPUT SYMBOL	&#x23A2;	LEFT SQUARE BRACKET EXTENSION	&#x23B2;	SUMMATION TOP	2
&#9090;		&#9106;		&#9122;		&#9138;		2
⎃	EMPHASIS SYMBOL	⎓	DIRECT CURRENT SYMBOL FORM TWO	⎣	LEFT SQUARE BRACKET LOWER CORNER	⎳	SUMMATION BOTTOM	3
&#x2383;	EMPHASIS SYMBOL	&#x2393;	DIRECT CURRENT SYMBOL FORM TWO	&#x23A3;	LEFT SQUARE BRACKET LOWER CORNER	&#x23B3;	SUMMATION BOTTOM	3
&#9091;		&#9107;		&#9123;		&#9139;		3
⎄	COMPOSITION SYMBOL	⎔	SOFTWARE-FUNCTION SYMBOL	⎤	RIGHT SQUARE BRACKET UPPER CORNER	⎴	TOP SQUARE BRACKET	4
&#x2384;	COMPOSITION SYMBOL	&#x2394;	SOFTWARE-FUNCTION SYMBOL	&#x23A4;	RIGHT SQUARE BRACKET UPPER CORNER	&#x23B4;	TOP SQUARE BRACKET	4
&#9092;		&#9108;		&#9124;		&#9140;		4
⎅	WHITE SQUARE WITH CENTRE VERTICAL LINE	⎕	APL FUNCTIONAL SYMBOL QUAD	⎥	RIGHT SQUARE BRACKET EXTENSION	⎵	BOTTOM SQUARE BRACKET	5
&#x2385;	WHITE SQUARE WITH CENTRE VERTICAL LINE	&#x2395;	APL FUNCTIONAL SYMBOL QUAD	&#x23A5;	RIGHT SQUARE BRACKET EXTENSION	&#x23B5;	BOTTOM SQUARE BRACKET	5
&#9093;		&#9109;		&#9125;		&#9141;		5
⎆	ENTER SYMBOL	⎖	DECIMAL SEPARATOR KEY SYMBOL	⎦	RIGHT SQUARE BRACKET LOWER CORNER	⎶	BOTTOM SQUARE BRACKET OVER TOP SQUARE BRACKET	6
&#x2386;	ENTER SYMBOL	&#x2396;	DECIMAL SEPARATOR KEY SYMBOL	&#x23A6;	RIGHT SQUARE BRACKET LOWER CORNER	&#x23B6;	BOTTOM SQUARE BRACKET OVER TOP SQUARE BRACKET	6
&#9094;		&#9110;		&#9126;		&#9142;		6
⎇	ALTERNATIVE KEY SYMBOL	⎗	PREVIOUS PAGE	⎧	LEFT CURLY BRACKET UPPER HOOK	⎷	RADICAL SYMBOL BOTTOM	7
&#x2387;	ALTERNATIVE KEY SYMBOL	&#x2397;	PREVIOUS PAGE	&#x23A7;	LEFT CURLY BRACKET UPPER HOOK	&#x23B7;	RADICAL SYMBOL BOTTOM	7
&#9095;		&#9111;		&#9127;		&#9143;		7
⎈	HELM SYMBOL	⎘	NEXT PAGE	⎨	LEFT CURLY BRACKET MIDDLE PIECE	⎸	LEFT VERTICAL BOX LINE	8
&#x2388;	HELM SYMBOL	&#x2398;	NEXT PAGE	&#x23A8;	LEFT CURLY BRACKET MIDDLE PIECE	&#x23B8;	LEFT VERTICAL BOX LINE	8
&#9096;		&#9112;		&#9128;		&#9144;		8
⎉	CIRCLED HORIZONTAL BAR WITH NOTCH	⎙	PRINT SCREEN SYMBOL	⎩	LEFT CURLY BRACKET LOWER HOOK	⎹	RIGHT VERTICAL BOX LINE	9
&#x2389;	CIRCLED HORIZONTAL BAR WITH NOTCH	&#x2399;	PRINT SCREEN SYMBOL	&#x23A9;	LEFT CURLY BRACKET LOWER HOOK	&#x23B9;	RIGHT VERTICAL BOX LINE	9
&#9097;		&#9113;		&#9129;		&#9145;		9
⎊	CIRCLED TRIANGLE DOWN	⎚	CLEAR SCREEN SYMBOL	⎪	CURLY BRACKET EXTENSION	⎺	HORIZONTAL SCAN LINE-1	A
&#x238A;	CIRCLED TRIANGLE DOWN	&#x239A;	CLEAR SCREEN SYMBOL	&#x23AA;	CURLY BRACKET EXTENSION	&#x23BA;	HORIZONTAL SCAN LINE-1	A
&#9098;		&#9114;		&#9130;		&#9146;		A
⎋	BROKEN CIRCLE WITH NORTHWEST ARROW	⎛	LEFT PARENTHESIS UPPER HOOK	⎫	RIGHT CURLY BRACKET UPPER HOOK	⎻	HORIZONTAL SCAN LINE-3	B
&#x238B;	BROKEN CIRCLE WITH NORTHWEST ARROW	&#x239B;	LEFT PARENTHESIS UPPER HOOK	&#x23AB;	RIGHT CURLY BRACKET UPPER HOOK	&#x23BB;	HORIZONTAL SCAN LINE-3	B
&#9099;		&#9115;		&#9131;		&#9147;		B
⎌	UNDO SYMBOL	⎜	LEFT PARENTHESIS EXTENSION	⎬	RIGHT CURLY BRACKET MIDDLE PIECE	⎼	HORIZONTAL SCAN LINE-7	C
&#x238C;	UNDO SYMBOL	&#x239C;	LEFT PARENTHESIS EXTENSION	&#x23AC;	RIGHT CURLY BRACKET MIDDLE PIECE	&#x23BC;	HORIZONTAL SCAN LINE-7	C
&#9100;		&#9116;		&#9132;		&#9148;		C
⎍	MONOSTABLE SYMBOL	⎝	LEFT PARENTHESIS LOWER HOOK	⎭	RIGHT CURLY BRACKET LOWER HOOK	⎽	HORIZONTAL SCAN LINE-9	D
&#x238D;	MONOSTABLE SYMBOL	&#x239D;	LEFT PARENTHESIS LOWER HOOK	&#x23AD;	RIGHT CURLY BRACKET LOWER HOOK	&#x23BD;	HORIZONTAL SCAN LINE-9	D
&#9101;		&#9117;		&#9133;		&#9149;		D
⎎	HYSTERESIS SYMBOL	⎞	RIGHT PARENTHESIS UPPER HOOK	⎮	INTEGRAL EXTENSION	⎾	DENTISTRY SYMBOL LIGHT VERTICAL AND TOP RIGHT	E
&#x238E;	HYSTERESIS SYMBOL	&#x239E;	RIGHT PARENTHESIS UPPER HOOK	&#x23AE;	INTEGRAL EXTENSION	&#x23BE;	DENTISTRY SYMBOL LIGHT VERTICAL AND TOP RIGHT	E
&#9102;		&#9118;		&#9134;		&#9150;		E
⎏	OPEN-CIRCUIT-OUTPUT H-TYPE SYMBOL	⎟	RIGHT PARENTHESIS EXTENSION	⎯	HORIZONTAL LINE EXTENSION	⎿	DENTISTRY SYMBOL LIGHT VERTICAL AND BOTTOM RIGHT	F
&#x238F;	OPEN-CIRCUIT-OUTPUT H-TYPE SYMBOL	&#x239F;	RIGHT PARENTHESIS EXTENSION	&#x23AF;	HORIZONTAL LINE EXTENSION	&#x23BF;	DENTISTRY SYMBOL LIGHT VERTICAL AND BOTTOM RIGHT	F
&#9103;		&#9119;		&#9135;		&#9151;		F
2380		2390		23A0		23B0		

=== (23C0–23FF) ===
23C0		23D0		23E0		23F0		
Symbol	Name	Symbol	Name	Symbol	Name	Symbol	Name	Last Hex#
HTML Hex	Name	HTML Hex	Name	HTML Hex	Name	HTML Hex	Name	Last Hex#
Dec	Picture	Dec	Picture	Dec	Picture	Dec	Picture	Last Hex#
⏀	DENTISTRY SYMBOL LIGHT VERTICAL WITH CIRCLE	⏐	VERTICAL LINE EXTENSION	⏠	TOP TORTOISE SHELL BRACKET	⏰	ALARM CLOCK	0
&#x23C0;	DENTISTRY SYMBOL LIGHT VERTICAL WITH CIRCLE	&#x23D0;	VERTICAL LINE EXTENSION	&#x23E0;	TOP TORTOISE SHELL BRACKET	&#x23F0;	ALARM CLOCK	0
&#9152;		&#9168;		&#9184;		&#9200;		0
⏁	DENTISTRY SYMBOL LIGHT DOWN AND HORIZONTAL WITH CIRCLE	⏑	METRICAL BREVE	⏡	BOTTOM TORTOISE SHELL BRACKET	⏱	STOPWATCH	1
&#x23C1;	DENTISTRY SYMBOL LIGHT DOWN AND HORIZONTAL WITH CIRCLE	&#x23D1;	METRICAL BREVE	&#x23E1;	BOTTOM TORTOISE SHELL BRACKET	&#x23F1;	STOPWATCH	1
&#9153;		&#9169;		&#9185;		&#9201;		1
⏂	DENTISTRY SYMBOL LIGHT UP AND HORIZONTAL WITH CIRCLE	⏒	METRICAL LONG OVER SHORT	⏢	WHITE TRAPEZIUM	⏲	TIMER CLOCK	2
&#x23C2;	DENTISTRY SYMBOL LIGHT UP AND HORIZONTAL WITH CIRCLE	&#x23D2;	METRICAL LONG OVER SHORT	&#x23E2;	WHITE TRAPEZIUM	&#x23F2;	TIMER CLOCK	2
&#9154;		&#9170;		&#9186;		&#9202;		2
⏃	DENTISTRY SYMBOL LIGHT VERTICAL WITH TRIANGLE	⏓	METRICAL SHORT OVER LONG	⏣	BENZENE RING WITH CIRCLE	⏳	HOURGLASS WITH FLOWING SAND	3
&#x23C3;	DENTISTRY SYMBOL LIGHT VERTICAL WITH TRIANGLE	&#x23D3;	METRICAL SHORT OVER LONG	&#x23E3;	BENZENE RING WITH CIRCLE	&#x23F3;	HOURGLASS WITH FLOWING SAND	3
&#9155;		&#9171;		&#9187;		&#9203;		3
⏄	DENTISTRY SYMBOL LIGHT DOWN AND HORIZONTAL WITH TRIANGLE	⏔	METRICAL LONG OVER TWO SHORTS	⏤	STRAIGHTNESS	⏴	BLACK MEDIUM LEFT-POINTING TRIANGLE	4
&#x23C4;	DENTISTRY SYMBOL LIGHT DOWN AND HORIZONTAL WITH TRIANGLE	&#x23D4;	METRICAL LONG OVER TWO SHORTS	&#x23E4;	STRAIGHTNESS	&#x23F4;	BLACK MEDIUM LEFT-POINTING TRIANGLE	4
&#9156;		&#9172;		&#9188;		&#9204;		4
⏅	DENTISTRY SYMBOL LIGHT UP AND HORIZONTAL WITH TRIANGLE	⏕	METRICAL TWO SHORTS OVER LONG	⏥	FLATNESS	⏵	BLACK MEDIUM RIGHT-POINTING TRIANGLE	5
&#x23C5;	DENTISTRY SYMBOL LIGHT UP AND HORIZONTAL WITH TRIANGLE	&#x23D5;	METRICAL TWO SHORTS OVER LONG	&#x23E5;	FLATNESS	&#x23F5;	BLACK MEDIUM RIGHT-POINTING TRIANGLE	5
&#9157;		&#9173;		&#9189;		&#9205;		5
⏆	DENTISTRY SYMBOL LIGHT VERTICAL AND WAVE	⏖	METRICAL TWO SHORTS JOINED	⏦	AC CURRENT	⏶	BLACK MEDIUM UP-POINTING TRIANGLE	6
&#x23C6;	DENTISTRY SYMBOL LIGHT VERTICAL AND WAVE	&#x23D6;	METRICAL TWO SHORTS JOINED	&#x23E6;	AC CURRENT	&#x23F6;	BLACK MEDIUM UP-POINTING TRIANGLE	6
&#9158;		&#9174;		&#9190;		&#9206;		6
⏇	DENTISTRY SYMBOL LIGHT DOWN AND HORIZONTAL WITH WAVE	⏗	METRICAL TRISEME	⏧	ELECTRICAL INTERSECTION	⏷	BLACK MEDIUM DOWN-POINTING TRIANGLE	7
&#x23C7;	DENTISTRY SYMBOL LIGHT DOWN AND HORIZONTAL WITH WAVE	&#x23D7;	METRICAL TRISEME	&#x23E7;	ELECTRICAL INTERSECTION	&#x23F7;	BLACK MEDIUM DOWN-POINTING TRIANGLE	7
&#9159;		&#9175;		&#9191;		&#9207;		7
⏈	DENTISTRY SYMBOL LIGHT UP AND HORIZONTAL WITH WAVE	⏘	METRICAL TETRASEME	⏨	DECIMAL EXPONENT SYMBOL	⏸	DOUBLE VERTICAL BAR	8
&#x23C8;	DENTISTRY SYMBOL LIGHT UP AND HORIZONTAL WITH WAVE	&#x23D8;	METRICAL TETRASEME	&#x23E8;	DECIMAL EXPONENT SYMBOL	&#x23F8;	DOUBLE VERTICAL BAR	8
&#9160;		&#9176;		&#9192;	_{10}	&#9208;		8
⏉	DENTISTRY SYMBOL LIGHT DOWN AND HORIZONTAL	⏙	METRICAL PENTASEME	⏩	BLACK RIGHT-POINTING DOUBLE TRIANGLE	⏹	BLACK SQUARE FOR STOP	9
&#x23C9;	DENTISTRY SYMBOL LIGHT DOWN AND HORIZONTAL	&#x23D9;	METRICAL PENTASEME	&#x23E9;	BLACK RIGHT-POINTING DOUBLE TRIANGLE	&#x23F9;	BLACK SQUARE FOR STOP	9
&#9161;		&#9177;		&#9193;		&#9209;		9
⏊	DENTISTRY SYMBOL LIGHT UP AND HORIZONTAL	⏚	EARTH GROUND	⏪	BLACK LEFT-POINTING DOUBLE TRIANGLE	⏺	BLACK CIRCLE FOR RECORD	A
&#x23CA;	DENTISTRY SYMBOL LIGHT UP AND HORIZONTAL	&#x23DA;	EARTH GROUND	&#x23EA;	BLACK LEFT-POINTING DOUBLE TRIANGLE	&#x23FA;	BLACK CIRCLE FOR RECORD	A
&#9162;		&#9178;		&#9194;		&#9210;		A
⏋	DENTISTRY SYMBOL LIGHT VERTICAL AND TOP LEFT	⏛	FUSE	⏫	BLACK UP-POINTING DOUBLE TRIANGLE	⏻	POWER SYMBOL	B
&#x23CB;	DENTISTRY SYMBOL LIGHT VERTICAL AND TOP LEFT	&#x23DB;	FUSE	&#x23EB;	BLACK UP-POINTING DOUBLE TRIANGLE	&#x23FB;	POWER SYMBOL	B
&#9163;		&#9179;		&#9195;		&#9211;		B
⏌	DENTISTRY SYMBOL LIGHT VERTICAL AND BOTTOM LEFT	⏜	TOP PARENTHESIS	⏬	BLACK DOWN-POINTING DOUBLE TRIANGLE	⏼	POWER ON-OFF SYMBOL	C
&#x23CC;	DENTISTRY SYMBOL LIGHT VERTICAL AND BOTTOM LEFT	&#x23DC;	TOP PARENTHESIS	&#x23EC;	BLACK DOWN-POINTING DOUBLE TRIANGLE	&#x23FC;	POWER ON-OFF SYMBOL	C
&#9164;		&#9180;		&#9196;		&#9212;		C
⏍	SQUARE FOOT	⏝	BOTTOM PARENTHESIS	⏭	BLACK RIGHT-POINTING DOUBLE TRIANGLE WITH VERTICAL BAR	⏽	POWER ON SYMBOL	D
&#x23CD;	SQUARE FOOT	&#x23DD;	BOTTOM PARENTHESIS	&#x23ED;	BLACK RIGHT-POINTING DOUBLE TRIANGLE WITH VERTICAL BAR	&#x23FD;	POWER ON SYMBOL	D
&#9165;		&#9181;		&#9197;		&#9213;		D
⏎	RETURN SYMBOL	⏞	TOP CURLY BRACKET	⏮	BLACK LEFT-POINTING DOUBLE TRIANGLE WITH VERTICAL BAR	⏾	POWER SLEEP SYMBOL	E
&#x23CE;	RETURN SYMBOL	&#x23DE;	TOP CURLY BRACKET	&#x23EE;	BLACK LEFT-POINTING DOUBLE TRIANGLE WITH VERTICAL BAR	&#x23FE;	POWER SLEEP SYMBOL	E
&#9166;		&#9182;		&#9198;		&#9214;		E
⏏	EJECT SYMBOL	⏟	BOTTOM CURLY BRACKET	⏯	BLACK RIGHT-POINTING TRIANGLE WITH DOUBLE VERTICAL BAR	⏿	OBSERVER EYE SYMBOL	F
&#x23CF;	EJECT SYMBOL	&#x23DF;	BOTTOM CURLY BRACKET	&#x23EF;	BLACK RIGHT-POINTING TRIANGLE WITH DOUBLE VERTICAL BAR	&#x23FF;	OBSERVER EYE SYMBOL	F
&#9167;		&#9183;		&#9199;		&#9215;		F
23C0		23D0		23E0		23F0		

== Block ==
Miscellaneous Technical^{[1]}^{[2]} Official Unicode Consortium code chart (PDF)
	0	1	2	3	4	5	6	7	8	9	A	B	C	D	E	F
U+230x	⌀	⌁	⌂	⌃	⌄	⌅	⌆	⌇	⌈	⌉	⌊	⌋	⌌	⌍	⌎	⌏
U+231x	⌐	⌑	⌒	⌓	⌔	⌕	⌖	⌗	⌘	⌙	⌚	⌛	⌜	⌝	⌞	⌟
U+232x	⌠	⌡	⌢	⌣	⌤	⌥	⌦	⌧	⌨	〈	〉	⌫	⌬	⌭	⌮	⌯
U+233x	⌰	⌱	⌲	⌳	⌴	⌵	⌶	⌷	⌸	⌹	⌺	⌻	⌼	⌽	⌾	⌿
U+234x	⍀	⍁	⍂	⍃	⍄	⍅	⍆	⍇	⍈	⍉	⍊	⍋	⍌	⍍	⍎	⍏
U+235x	⍐	⍑	⍒	⍓	⍔	⍕	⍖	⍗	⍘	⍙	⍚	⍛	⍜	⍝	⍞	⍟
U+236x	⍠	⍡	⍢	⍣	⍤	⍥	⍦	⍧	⍨	⍩	⍪	⍫	⍬	⍭	⍮	⍯
U+237x	⍰	⍱	⍲	⍳	⍴	⍵	⍶	⍷	⍸	⍹	⍺	⍻	⍼	⍽	⍾	⍿
U+238x	⎀	⎁	⎂	⎃	⎄	⎅	⎆	⎇	⎈	⎉	⎊	⎋	⎌	⎍	⎎	⎏
U+239x	⎐	⎑	⎒	⎓	⎔	⎕	⎖	⎗	⎘	⎙	⎚	⎛	⎜	⎝	⎞	⎟
U+23Ax	⎠	⎡	⎢	⎣	⎤	⎥	⎦	⎧	⎨	⎩	⎪	⎫	⎬	⎭	⎮	⎯
U+23Bx	⎰	⎱	⎲	⎳	⎴	⎵	⎶	⎷	⎸	⎹	⎺	⎻	⎼	⎽	⎾	⎿
U+23Cx	⏀	⏁	⏂	⏃	⏄	⏅	⏆	⏇	⏈	⏉	⏊	⏋	⏌	⏍	⏎	⏏
U+23Dx	⏐	⏑	⏒	⏓	⏔	⏕	⏖	⏗	⏘	⏙	⏚	⏛	⏜	⏝	⏞	⏟
U+23Ex	⏠	⏡	⏢	⏣	⏤	⏥	⏦	⏧	⏨	⏩	⏪	⏫	⏬	⏭	⏮	⏯
U+23Fx	⏰	⏱	⏲	⏳	⏴	⏵	⏶	⏷	⏸	⏹	⏺	⏻	⏼	⏽	⏾	⏿
Notes 1.As of Unicode version 18.0 2.Unicode code points U+2329 and U+232A are deprecated as of Unicode version 5.2

== Emoji ==
The Miscellaneous Technical block contains eighteen emoji: U+231A–U+231B, U+2328, U+23CF, U+23E9–U+23F3 and U+23F8–U+23FA.

All of these characters have standardized variants defined, to specify emoji-style (U+FE0F VS16) or text presentation (U+FE0E VS15) for each character, for a total of 36 variants.

Emoji variation sequences
U+	231A	231B	2328	23CF	23E9	23EA	23EB	23EC	23ED
default presentation	emoji	emoji	text	text	emoji	emoji	emoji	emoji	text
base code point	⌚	⌛	⌨	⏏	⏩	⏪	⏫	⏬	⏭
base+VS15 (text)	⌚︎	⌛︎	⌨︎	⏏︎	⏩︎	⏪︎	⏫︎	⏬︎	⏭︎
base+VS16 (emoji)	⌚️	⌛️	⌨️	⏏️	⏩️	⏪️	⏫️	⏬️	⏭️
U+	23EE	23EF	23F0	23F1	23F2	23F3	23F8	23F9	23FA
default presentation	text	text	emoji	text	text	emoji	text	text	text
base code point	⏮	⏯	⏰	⏱	⏲	⏳	⏸	⏹	⏺
base+VS15 (text)	⏮︎	⏯︎	⏰︎	⏱︎	⏲︎	⏳︎	⏸︎	⏹︎	⏺︎
base+VS16 (emoji)	⏮️	⏯️	⏰️	⏱️	⏲️	⏳️	⏸️	⏹️	⏺️

== History ==
The following Unicode-related documents record the purpose and process of defining specific characters in the Miscellaneous Technical block:

Version	Final code points (Note: Proposed code points and characters names may differ from final code points and names)	Count	L2 ID	WG2 ID	Document
1.0.0	U+2302..232C	43			(to be determined)
1.0.0	U+2302..232C	43	L2/01-295R		Moore, Lisa (2001-11-06), "Motion 88-M12", Minutes from the UTC/L2 meeting #88, "The UTC approves changing the annotations of U+2329 and U+232A to reference U+27E8 and U+27E9 as the correct characters to use. It also approves adding an annotation to U+2329 and U+232A to discourage their use."
1.0.0	U+2302..232C	43	L2/08-275		Freytag, Asmus (2008-07-31), Comments on the proposed deprecation of characters (public review item #122)
1.0.0	U+2302..232C	43	L2/08-278		Pentzlin, Karl (2008-08-04), Comments on Public Review Issue #122
1.0.0	U+2302..232C	43	L2/08-287		Davis, Mark (2008-08-04), Public Review Issue #122: Proposal for Additional Deprecated Characters
1.0.0	U+2302..232C	43	L2/08-253R2		Moore, Lisa (2008-08-19), "Consensus 116-C13", UTC #116 Minutes, "Change the deprecated property by removing 0340, 0341, 17D3, and adding 0149, 0F77, 0F79, 17A4, 2329, 232A."
1.0.0	U+2302..232C	43	L2/08-328 (html, xls)		Whistler, Ken (2008-10-14), Spreadsheet of Deprecation and Discouragement
1.0.0	U+2302..232C	43	L2/10-351	N3897	"6. Annotations to be changed for existing characters", Proposal to incorporate symbols of ISO/IEC 9995-7:2009 and Amendment 1 into the UCS, 2010-09-21
1.0.0	U+2302..232C	43	L2/10-448		Constable, Peter (2010-10-30), "6. Annotations to be changed for existing characters", UTC Liaison Report from WG2
1.0.0	U+2302..232C	43	L2/11-438 (Note: See also L2/10-458, L2/11-414, L2/11-415, and L2/11-429) (Note: Refer to the history section of the Miscellaneous Symbols and Pictographs block for additional emoji-related documents)	N4182	Edberg, Peter (2011-12-22), Emoji Variation Sequences (Revision of L2/11-429)
1.0.0	U+2302..232C	43	L2/12-302	N4317	Pentzlin, Karl (2012-10-08), Revised proposal to incorporate the symbols of ISO/IEC 9995-7:2009
1.0.0	U+2302..232C	43	L2/13-058		Moore, Lisa (2013-06-12), "Consensus 135-C14", UTC #135 Minutes
1.0.0	U+2302..232C	43	L2/15-050R (Note: See also L2/13-207, L2/14-054, L2/14-063, L2/15-051A, L2/15-051B)		Davis, Mark; et al. (2015-01-29), Additional variation selectors for emoji
1.0.0	U+2302..232C	43	L2/15-301 (Note: See also L2/15-198 and L2/15-275)		Pournader, Roozbeh (2015-11-01), A proposal for 278 standardized variation sequences for emoji
1.1	U+2300, 232D..237A	79			(to be determined)
3.0	U+2301, 237B, 237D..237F	5		N1045	Defect Report on 10646 Repoertoire (Add ISO 2047symbols), 1994-08-01
3.0	U+2301, 237B, 237D..237F	5		N1203	Umamaheswaran, V. S.; Ksar, Mike (1995-05-03), "6.1.3.2", Unconfirmed minutes of SC2/WG2 Meeting 27, Geneva
3.0	U+2301, 237B, 237D..237F	5	L2/98-004R	N1681	Text of ISO 10646 – AMD 18 for PDAM registration and FPDAM ballot, 1997-12-22
3.0	U+2301, 237B, 237D..237F	5	L2/98-318	N1894	Revised text of 10646-1/FPDAM 18, AMENDMENT 18: Symbols and Others, 1998-10-22
3.0	U+2301, 237B, 237D..237F	5	L2/99-010	N1903 (pdf, html, doc)	Umamaheswaran, V. S. (1998-12-30), "6.7.3", Minutes of WG 2 meeting 35, London, U.K.; 1998-09-21--25
3.0	U+2380..238C, 2396..239A	18		N1138	LaBonté, Alain (1995-01-30), Proposal to add new characters (Keyboard related) to 10646
3.0	U+2380..238C, 2396..239A	18		N1203	Umamaheswaran, V. S.; Ksar, Mike (1995-05-03), "6.1.6", Unconfirmed minutes of SC2/WG2 Meeting 27, Geneva
3.0	U+2380..238C, 2396..239A	18		N1303 (html, doc)	Umamaheswaran, V. S.; Ksar, Mike (1996-01-26), Minutes of Meeting 29, Tokyo
3.0	U+2380..238C, 2396..239A	18	L2/97-128	N1564	Paterson, Bruce (1997-05-15), Draft pDAM for various additional characters (the "holding bucket")
3.0	U+2380..238C, 2396..239A	18	L2/97-167	N1625	Suignard, Michel (1997-07-03), Report of ad hoc group on keyboard symbols
3.0	U+2380..238C, 2396..239A	18		N1669	Position on PDAM-NN - Symbols - ref N1625, 1997-08-05
3.0	U+2380..238C, 2396..239A	18	L2/97-288	N1603	Umamaheswaran, V. S. (1997-10-24), "7.3", Unconfirmed Meeting Minutes, WG 2 Meeting # 33, Heraklion, Crete, Greece, 20 June – 4 July 1997
3.0	U+2380..238C, 2396..239A	18	L2/98-005R	N1682	Text of ISO 10646 - AMD 22 for PDAM registration and PDAM ballot, 1997-12-17
3.0	U+2380..238C, 2396..239A	18		N1830 (html, doc)	Summary of Voting/Table of Replies - Amendment 22 - Symbols, 1998-04-15
3.0	U+2380..238C, 2396..239A	18		N1816R	Paterson, Bruce (1998-09-22), Disposition of comments on PDAM.22 (2nd draft)
3.0	U+2380..238C, 2396..239A	18	L2/98-320	N1898	ISO/IEC 10646-1/FPDAM 22, AMENDMENT 22: Keyboard Symbols, 1998-10-22
3.0	U+2380..238C, 2396..239A	18		N1897	Paterson, Bruce; Everson, Michael (1998-10-22), Disposition of Comments - FPDAM22 - Keyboard Symbols - SC2 N3191
3.0	U+2380..238C, 2396..239A	18	L2/99-010	N1903 (pdf, html, doc)	Umamaheswaran, V. S. (1998-12-30), Minutes of WG 2 meeting 35, London, U.K.; 1998-09-21--25
3.0	U+2380..238C, 2396..239A	18	L2/99-126		Paterson, Bruce (1999-04-14), Text for FDAM ballot ISO/IEC 10646 FDAM #22 - Keyboard symbols
3.0	U+2380..238C, 2396..239A	18	L2/99-232	N2003	Umamaheswaran, V. S. (1999-08-03), "6.2.5 FPDAM22 - Keyboard Symbols", Minutes of WG 2 meeting 36, Fukuoka, Japan, 1999-03-09--15
3.0	U+2380..238C, 2396..239A	18	L2/15-050R		Davis, Mark; et al. (2015-01-29), Additional variation selectors for emoji
3.0	U+238D..2394	8	X3L2/94-072	N985	Ross, Hugh McGregor (1994-03-28), Electrotechnical Symbols for First Addendum
3.0	U+238D..2394	8		N1146	Ross, Hugh McGregor, Extra Electrotechnical Symbols - proposal summary form for N985
3.0	U+238D..2394	8		N1303 (html, doc)	Umamaheswaran, V. S.; Ksar, Mike (1996-01-26), "8.8.3 Electrotechnical symbols", Minutes of Meeting 29, Tokyo
3.0	U+238D..2394	8		N1353	Umamaheswaran, V. S.; Ksar, Mike (1996-06-25), "8.7.4", Draft minutes of WG2 Copenhagen Meeting # 30
3.0	U+238D..2394	8	L2/98-004R	N1681	Text of ISO 10646 – AMD 18 for PDAM registration and FPDAM ballot, 1997-12-22
3.0	U+238D..2394	8	L2/98-318	N1894	Revised text of 10646-1/FPDAM 18, AMENDMENT 18: Symbols and Others, 1998-10-22
3.0	U+238D..2394	8	L2/99-010	N1903 (pdf, html, doc)	Umamaheswaran, V. S. (1998-12-30), "6.7.3", Minutes of WG 2 meeting 35, London, U.K.; 1998-09-21--25
3.0	U+238D..2394	8	L2/00-083	N2174	Ross, Hugh McGregor (2000-03-03), Comment on IEC 61286-2, Electrotechnical Symbols
3.0	U+2395	1		N1087	Suggested additions to repertoire of APL, 1994-10-07
3.0	U+2395	1		N1117	Umamaheswaran, V. S.; Ksar, Mike (1994-10-31), "9.4.2", Unconfirmed Minutes of ISO/IEC JTC 1/SC 2/WG 2 Meeting 26, Tuscan Inn - Fisherman's Wharf, San Francisco, CA, UAS; 1994-10-10 through 14
3.0	U+2395	1		N1303 (html, doc)	Umamaheswaran, V. S.; Ksar, Mike (1996-01-26), "8.1 APL", Minutes of Meeting 29, Tokyo
3.0	U+2395	1		N1419	Clayton, Leigh (1996-07-22), Proposal Summary Form - APL Function Symbol Quad
3.0	U+2395	1		N1453	Ksar, Mike; Umamaheswaran, V. S. (1996-12-06), "8.7.3", WG 2 Minutes - Quebec Meeting 31
3.0	U+2395	1	X3L2/96-123		Aliprand, Joan; Winkler, Arnold (1996-12-18), "Quad symbol", Preliminary Minutes - UTC #71 & X3L2 #168 ad hoc meeting, San Diego - December 5-6, 1996, "The UTC accepts the change of APL quad symbol from 237B to 2395"
3.0	U+2395	1	L2/98-004R	N1681	Text of ISO 10646 – AMD 18 for PDAM registration and FPDAM ballot, 1997-12-22
3.0	U+2395	1	L2/98-318	N1894	Revised text of 10646-1/FPDAM 18, AMENDMENT 18: Symbols and Others, 1998-10-22
3.2	U+237C, 23B4..23B6	4	L2/00-119 (Note: Refer to the history section of the Miscellaneous Mathematical Symbols-B block for additional math-related documents)	N2191R	Whistler, Ken; Freytag, Asmus (2000-04-19), Encoding Additional Mathematical Symbols in Unicode
3.2	U+237C, 23B4..23B6	4	L2/00-234	N2203 (rtf, txt)	Umamaheswaran, V. S. (2000-07-21), "8.18", Minutes from the SC2/WG2 meeting in Beijing, 2000-03-21 -- 24
3.2	U+237C, 23B4..23B6	4	L2/00-115R2		Moore, Lisa (2000-08-08), "Motion 83-M11", Minutes Of UTC Meeting #83
3.2	U+237C, 23B4..23B6	4	L2/05-279		Moore, Lisa (2005-11-10), "Consensus 105-C36", UTC #105 Minutes, "Properties - Brackets (B.14.3)"
3.2	U+239B..23B3	25	L2/99-043		Sargent, Murray (1999-02-04), Mathematical brace pieces
3.2	U+239B..23B3	25	L2/99-054R		Aliprand, Joan (1999-06-21), "Math Braces, etc.", Approved Minutes from the UTC/L2 meeting in Palo Alto, February 3-5, 1999
3.2	U+239B..23B3	25	L2/99-346R		Sargent, Murray (1999-10-27), Mathematical brace pieces
3.2	U+239B..23B3	25	L2/99-260R		Moore, Lisa (2000-02-07), "Math Brace Characters", Minutes of the UTC/L2 meeting in Mission Viejo, October 26-28, 1999
3.2	U+239B..23B3	25	L2/00-119	N2191R	Whistler, Ken; Freytag, Asmus (2000-04-19), Encoding Additional Mathematical Symbols in Unicode
3.2	U+239B..23B3	25	L2/00-234	N2203 (rtf, txt)	Umamaheswaran, V. S. (2000-07-21), "8.18", Minutes from the SC2/WG2 meeting in Beijing, 2000-03-21 -- 24
3.2	U+23B7..23BD	7	L2/00-159		da Cruz, Frank (2000-03-31), Supplemental Terminal Graphics for Unicode
3.2	U+23B7..23BD	7	L2/00-115R2		Moore, Lisa (2000-08-08), "Motion 83-M24", Minutes Of UTC Meeting #83
3.2	U+23B7..23BD	7	L2/00-329	N2265	Whistler, Ken (2000-09-19), Proposal for Terminal Graphic Symbols in the BMP
3.2	U+23B7..23BD	7	L2/01-050	N2253	Umamaheswaran, V. S. (2001-01-21), "Resolution M39.20 (Terminal Graphic Symbols)", Minutes of the SC2/WG2 meeting in Athens, September 2000
3.2	U+23BE..23CC, 23CE	16	L2/99-238		Consolidated document containing 6 Japanese proposals, 1999-07-15
3.2	U+23BE..23CC, 23CE	16		N2092	Addition of forty eight characters, 1999-09-13
3.2	U+23BE..23CC, 23CE	16		N2093	Addition of medical symbols and enclosed numbers, 1999-09-13
3.2	U+23BE..23CC, 23CE	16	L2/99-365		Moore, Lisa (1999-11-23), Comments on JCS Proposals
3.2	U+23BE..23CC, 23CE	16	L2/00-010	N2103	Umamaheswaran, V. S. (2000-01-05), "8.8", Minutes of WG 2 meeting 37, Copenhagen, Denmark: 1999-09-13—16
3.2	U+23BE..23CC, 23CE	16	L2/00-024		Shibano, Kohji (2000-01-31), JCS proposal revised
3.2	U+23BE..23CC, 23CE	16	L2/99-260R		Moore, Lisa (2000-02-07), "JCS Proposals", Minutes of the UTC/L2 meeting in Mission Viejo, October 26-28, 1999
3.2	U+23BE..23CC, 23CE	16	L2/00-098, L2/00-098-page5	N2195	Rationale for non-Kanji characters proposed by JCS committee, 2000-03-15
3.2	U+23BE..23CC, 23CE	16	L2/00-234	N2203 (rtf, txt)	Umamaheswaran, V. S. (2000-07-21), "8.20", Minutes from the SC2/WG2 meeting in Beijing, 2000-03-21 -- 24
3.2	U+23BE..23CC, 23CE	16	L2/00-115R2		Moore, Lisa (2000-08-08), "Motion 83-M3", Minutes Of UTC Meeting #83
3.2	U+23BE..23CC, 23CE	16	L2/00-298	N2258	Sato, T. K. (2000-09-04), JIS X 0213 symbols part-2
3.2	U+23BE..23CC, 23CE	16	L2/00-342	N2278	Sato, T. K.; Everson, Michael; Whistler, Ken; Freytag, Asmus (2000-09-20), Ad hoc Report on Japan feedback N2257 and N2258
3.2	U+23BE..23CC, 23CE	16	L2/01-050	N2253	Umamaheswaran, V. S. (2001-01-21), "7.16 JIS X0213 Symbols", Minutes of the SC2/WG2 meeting in Athens, September 2000
3.2	U+23BE..23CC, 23CE	16	L2/01-114	N2328	Summary of Voting on SC 2 N 3503, ISO/IEC 10646-1: 2000/PDAM 1, 2001-03-09
3.2	U+23BE..23CC, 23CE	16	L2/01-227		Whistler, Ken (2001-05-22), "ITEM 5", WG2 Consent Docket for UTC #87
3.2	U+23BE..23CC, 23CE	16	L2/01-184R		Moore, Lisa (2001-06-18), "Motion 87-M16, ITEM 5", Minutes from the UTC/L2 meeting
3.2	U+23BE..23CC, 23CE	16	L2/01-344	N2353 (pdf, doc)	Umamaheswaran, V. S. (2001-09-09), "SE6", Minutes from SC2/WG2 meeting #40 -- Mountain View, April 2001
3.2	U+23CD	1	L2/98-374	N1887R	Freytag, Asmus (1998-09-24), Three symbols
3.2	U+23CD	1	L2/99-010	N1903 (pdf, html, doc)	Umamaheswaran, V. S. (1998-12-30), Minutes of WG 2 meeting 35, London, U.K.; 1998-09-21--25
3.2	U+23CD	1	L2/00-091	N2184	Freytag, Asmus (2000-03-14), Additional information on the proposal to add three symbols
3.2	U+23CD	1	L2/00-234	N2203 (rtf, txt)	Umamaheswaran, V. S. (2000-07-21), "8.7", Minutes from the SC2/WG2 meeting in Beijing, 2000-03-21 -- 24
3.2	U+23CD	1	L2/00-115R2		Moore, Lisa (2000-08-08), Minutes Of UTC Meeting #83
4.0	U+23CF	1	L2/01-414		Jenkins, John (2001-11-02), Proposal to Add the Eject Key Symbol to Unicode
4.0	U+23CF	1	L2/01-452		Freytag, Asmus; Everson, Michael (2001-11-07), Response to the EJECT SYMBOL proposal
4.0	U+23CF	1	L2/02-072		Goldsmith, Deborah (2002-02-10), Eject Symbol
4.0	U+23CF	1	L2/02-070		Moore, Lisa (2002-08-26), "Consensus: Accept the addition of the EJECT SYMBOL at U+23CF.", Minutes for UTC #90
4.0	U+23CF	1	L2/15-050R		Davis, Mark; et al. (2015-01-29), Additional variation selectors for emoji
4.0	U+23CF	1	L2/15-301		Pournader, Roozbeh (2015-11-01), A proposal for 278 standardized variation sequences for emoji
4.0	U+23D0	1	L2/02-278		Muller, Eric (2002-07-30), Proposal to add a VERTICAL LINE EXTENSION character
4.0	U+23D0	1	L2/02-371	N2508	Muller, Eric (2002-10-30), Proposal to add a Vertical Line Extension character to 10646
4.1	U+23D1..23D9	9	L2/02-030		Anderson, Deborah (2002-01-21), Metrical Signs Proposal for Unicode
4.1	U+23D1..23D9	9	L2/02-033		Anderson, Deborah (2002-01-21), TLG Unicode Proposal (draft)
4.1	U+23D1..23D9	9	L2/02-053		Anderson, Deborah (2002-02-04), Description of TLG Documents
4.1	U+23D1..23D9	9	L2/02-273		Pantelia, Maria (2002-07-31), TLG Unicode Proposal
4.1	U+23D1..23D9	9	L2/02-287		Pantelia, Maria (2002-08-09), Proposal Summary Form accompanying TLG Unicode Proposal (L2/02-273)
4.1	U+23D1..23D9	9	L2/02-315R2	N2546	Pantelia, Maria (2002-11-07), Proposal for encoding Greek Metrical Symbols in the UCS
4.1	U+23D1..23D9	9	L2/04-196	N2653 (pdf, doc)	Umamaheswaran, V. S. (2004-06-04), "M44.5 aa", Unconfirmed minutes of WG 2 meeting 44
4.1	U+23DA..23DB	2	L2/02-423	N2513	Hong Kong Special Administrative Region submission to WG2 for ISO 10646, 2002-10-25
4.1	U+23DA..23DB	2	L2/03-356R2		Moore, Lisa (2003-10-22), "Six HKSCS characters (B.14.2)", UTC #97 Minutes
4.1	U+23DA..23DB	2	L2/03-411		Goldsmith, Deborah; Muller, Eric (2003-10-31), Unencoded chars in GB 18030 & HK-SCS
4.1	U+23DA..23DB	2	L2/04-161R	N2807	Suignard, Michel; Muller, Eric; Jenkins, John (2004-06-17), HKSCS and GB 18030 PUA characters, background document
4.1	U+23DA..23DB	2	L2/04-240	N2791	Muller, Eric (2004-06-10), Evidence for the Earth and Fuse proposed characters
4.1	U+23DA..23DB	2	L2/04-263	N2808	Suignard, Michel (2004-06-17), HKSCS and GB 18030 PUA characters, request for additional characters and related information
4.1	U+23DA..23DB	2	L2/05-038	N2926	Suignard, Michel (2005-01-27), "China Comment 1", Disposition of comments on SC2 N 3760 (FPDAM text for Amendment 1 to ISO/IEC 10646:2003)
5.0	U+23DC..23E1	6	L2/04-329	N2842	Sargent, Murray (2004-08-03), Mathematical Horizontal Bracket Characters
5.0	U+23DC..23E1	6	L2/05-270		Whistler, Ken (2005-09-21), "B. Horizontal mathematical bracket", WG2 Consent Docket (Sophia Antipolis)
5.0	U+23DC..23E1	6	L2/05-279		Moore, Lisa (2005-11-10), "Consensus 105-C29", UTC #105 Minutes
5.0	U+23DC..23E1	6		N2953 (pdf, doc)	Umamaheswaran, V. S. (2006-02-16), "M47.9", Unconfirmed minutes of WG 2 meeting 47, Sophia Antipolis, France; 2005-09-12/15
5.0	U+23E2..23E7	6	L2/04-406		Freytag, Asmus; Sargent, Murray; Beeton, Barbara; Carlisle, David (2004-11-15), Progress report on Mathematical Symbols
5.0	U+23E2..23E7	6	L2/04-410		Freytag, Asmus (2004-11-18), Twenty six mathematical characters
5.0	U+23E2..23E7	6	L2/05-270		Whistler, Ken (2005-09-21), "B", WG2 Consent Docket (Sophia Antipolis)
5.0	U+23E2..23E7	6	L2/05-279		Moore, Lisa (2005-11-10), "Consensus 105-C29", UTC #105 Minutes
5.0	U+23E2..23E7	6		N2953 (pdf, doc)	Umamaheswaran, V. S. (2006-02-16), "M47.9", Unconfirmed minutes of WG 2 meeting 47, Sophia Antipolis, France; 2005-09-12/15
5.2	U+23E8	1	L2/08-030R		Broukhis, Leonid (2008-01-22), Revised proposal to encode the decimal exponent symbol
5.2	U+23E8	1	L2/08-003		Moore, Lisa (2008-02-14), "Subscript Ten", UTC #114 Minutes
5.2	U+23E8	1	L2/08-318	N3453 (pdf, doc)	Umamaheswaran, V. S. (2008-08-13), "M52.20b", Unconfirmed minutes of WG 2 meeting 52
6.0	U+23E9..23F3	11	L2/01-452		Freytag, Asmus; Everson, Michael (2001-11-07), Response to the EJECT SYMBOL proposal
6.0	U+23E9..23F3	11	L2/02-085	N2415	Freytag, Asmus; Everson, Michael; Goldsmith, Deborah (2002-02-12), Playback Symbols
6.0	U+23E9..23F3	11	L2/09-007		Lommel, Arle (2008-12-26), Comparison of Emoticons from Major Vendors
6.0	U+23E9..23F3	11	L2/09-025R2	N3582 (Note: Japanese translation of N3582 is available as N3621)	Scherer, Markus; Davis, Mark; Momoi, Kat; Tong, Darick; Kida, Yasuo; Edberg, Peter (2009-03-05), Proposal for Encoding Emoji Symbols
6.0	U+23E9..23F3	11	L2/09-026R	N3583	Scherer, Markus; Davis, Mark; Momoi, Kat; Tong, Darick; Kida, Yasuo; Edberg, Peter (2009-02-06), Emoji Symbols Proposed for New Encoding
6.0	U+23E9..23F3	11	L2/09-027R2	N3681	Scherer, Markus (2009-09-17), Emoji Symbols: Background Data
6.0	U+23E9..23F3	11	L2/09-114	N3607	Towards an encoding of symbol characters used as emoji, 2009-04-06
6.0	U+23E9..23F3	11	L2/09-139	N3614 (Note: Japanese translation of N3614 is available as N3620)	Scherer, Markus; Davis, Mark; Momoi, Kat; Tong, Darick; Kida, Yasuo; Edberg, Peter (2009-04-09), Response to Concerns Raised in N3607 About Encoding Emoji Characters
6.0	U+23E9..23F3	11	L2/09-412	N3722	Suignard, Michel (2009-10-26), "Ireland E1", Disposition of comments on SC2 N 4078 (PDAM text for Amendment 8 to ISO/IEC 10646:2003)
6.0	U+23E9..23F3	11	L2/10-132		Scherer, Markus; Davis, Mark; Momoi, Kat; Tong, Darick; Kida, Yasuo; Edberg, Peter (2010-04-27), Emoji Symbols: Background Data
6.0	U+23E9..23F3	11	L2/12-368	N4384	Suignard, Michel (2012-11-06), Status of encoding of Wingdings and Webdings Symbols
6.0	U+23E9..23F3	11	L2/15-050R		Davis, Mark; et al. (2015-01-29), Additional variation selectors for emoji
6.0	U+23E9..23F3	11	L2/15-301		Pournader, Roozbeh (2015-11-01), A proposal for 278 standardized variation sequences for emoji
6.0	U+23E9..23F3	11	L2/16-361		Pournader, Roozbeh; Felt, Doug (2016-11-07), Add text and emoji standardized variation sequences for 96 symbols
6.0	U+23E9..23F3	11	L2/22-229R		Leroy, Robin; Davis, Mark (2022-10-28), Proposed changes to Unicode properties and reports for source code handling, "Add to the file emoji-variation-sequences.txt any code points from the following set that are not already in it... [Affects U+23EB, 23EC, and 23F0]"
6.0	U+23E9..23F3	11	L2/22-241		Constable, Peter (2022-11-09), "Consensus 173-C29", Approved Minutes of UTC Meeting 173, "Accept the proposals in L2/22-229R"
7.0	U+23F4..23FA	7	L2/01-452		Freytag, Asmus; Everson, Michael (2001-11-07), Response to the EJECT SYMBOL proposal
7.0	U+23F4..23FA	7	L2/02-085	N2415	Freytag, Asmus; Everson, Michael; Goldsmith, Deborah (2002-02-12), Playback Symbols
7.0	U+23F4..23FA	7	L2/12-368	N4384	Suignard, Michel (2012-11-06), Status of encoding of Wingdings and Webdings Symbols
7.0	U+23F4..23FA	7	L2/15-050R		Davis, Mark; et al. (2015-01-29), Additional variation selectors for emoji
7.0	U+23F4..23FA	7	L2/15-301		Pournader, Roozbeh (2015-11-01), A proposal for 278 standardized variation sequences for emoji
9.0	U+23FB..23FE	4	L2/14-053		Anderson, Deborah; Whistler, Ken; McGowan, Rick; Pournader, Roozbeh; Iancu, Laurențiu (2014-01-26), "25", Recommendations to UTC #138 February 2014 on Script Proposals
9.0	U+23FB..23FE	4	L2/14-059	N4535	Everson, Michael (2014-02-04), Towards a proposal to encode power symbols in the UCS
9.0	U+23FB..23FE	4	L2/14-009R	N4567	Eden, Terence; Loughry, Joe; Nordman, Bruce (2014-02-14), Proposal to Include IEC Power Symbols
9.0	U+23FB..23FE	4	L2/14-026		Moore, Lisa (2014-02-17), "E.2", UTC #138 Minutes
9.0	U+23FB..23FE	4		N4553 (pdf, doc)	Umamaheswaran, V. S. (2014-09-16), "M62.09d, M62.09e, M62.09j, M62.09k", Minutes of WG 2 meeting 62 Adobe, San Jose, CA, USA
9.0	U+23FB..23FE	4	L2/14-177		Moore, Lisa (2014-10-17), "Consensus 140-C26", UTC #140 Minutes, "Change U+1F32D BLACK WANING CRESCENT MOON to U+23FE POWER SLEEP SYMBOL."
9.0	U+23FB..23FE	4	L2/16-052	N4603 (pdf, doc)	Umamaheswaran, V. S. (2015-09-01), "M63.03i", Unconfirmed minutes of WG 2 meeting 63
10.0	U+23FF	1	L2/15-031R		Griffee, Simon (2015-02-26), International symbol for an observer
10.0	U+23FF	1	L2/15-017		Moore, Lisa (2015-02-12), "E.2", UTC #142 Minutes
10.0	U+23FF	1	L2/15-095		McGowan, Rick (2015-03-09), Examples of OBSERVER EYE SYMBOL, in support of proposal L2/15-031R
10.0	U+23FF	1	L2/15-107		Moore, Lisa (2015-05-12), "E.3", UTC #143 Minutes

== See also ==
- Unicode mathematical operators and symbols
- Unicode symbols
- Media control symbols
