= Genkō yōshi =

Japanese manuscript paper

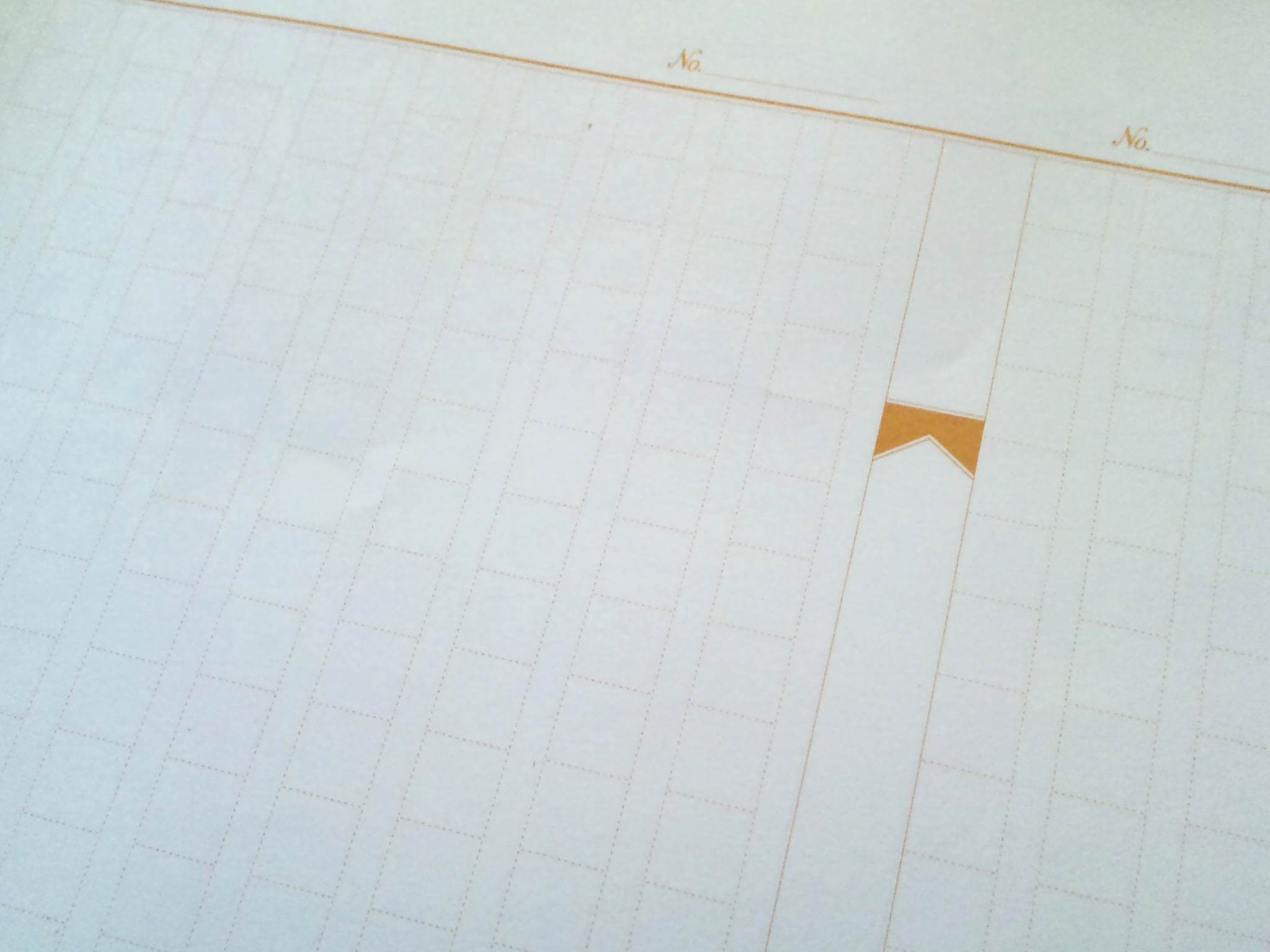
Popular design

Genkō yōshi (原稿用紙, "manuscript paper") is a type of Japanese paper used for writing. It is printed with squares, typically 200 or 400 per sheet, each square designed to accommodate a single Japanese character or punctuation mark. Genkō yōshi may be used with any type of writing instrument (pencil, pen or ink brush), and with or without a shitajiki (protective "under-sheet").

While in the past genkō yōshi was used for all types of manuscript writing (essays, creative writing, news writing and so on), in most cases the advent of the computer means that this is now the preferred medium, although some Japanese word processing software still includes a genkō yōshi template. However, genkō yōshi is still very widely used, especially by students. Primary and secondary students in particular are required to hand in assignments written on genkō yōshi, and essays for school entrance examinations are also written on the paper, making knowledge of the correct way to use genkō yōshi essential.

It is also the main form of rule used by Taiwanese students when writing Taiwanese Mandarin, where it is called 原稿紙 (pinyin: yuángǎo zhǐ). In Taiwan, students use the thin vertical column to transcribe Bopomofo pronunciation. Some programs of Japanese as a foreign language also require or encourage their adult students to use genkō yōshi for practice or formal assignments or both, as use of the paper helps students to learn correct spacing when writing vertically.

== Form ==
Genkō yōshi is used for vertical writing (although by turning the page sideways it can be used for horizontal writing too), and is most commonly printed in columns of twenty squares, with ten columns per page (each B4-sized sheet of genkō yōshi comprising two pages), but other configurations are also available. Between consecutive columns of squares is a blank space used for writing furigana (ruby characters), bōten (a type of punctuation mark used for giving emphasis) or other marks.

In the centre of each two-page spread of genkō yōshi (between the two sets of ten columns) is a wide blank space, allowing the sheets to be bound or folded.

Correct use of genkō yōshi (400 square sheet shown): 1. Title on the 1st column, first character in the 4th square.; 2. Author's name on the 2nd column, with 1 square between the family name and the given name, and 1 empty square below.; 3. First sentence of the essay begins on the 3rd column, in the 2nd square. Each new paragraph begins on the 2nd square.; 4. Subheadings have 1 empty column before and after, and begin on the 3rd square of a new column.; 5. Punctuation marks normally occupy their own square, except when they will occur at the top of a column, in which case they share a square with the last character of the previous column.

== Origin ==
Prior to the Edo period, handwriting was often calligraphic and written materials often made use of scrolls, which would have made the guidelines printed on genkō yōshi a hindrance, although paper was sometimes printed with vertical lines designed to keep columns of vertical writing straight.

Genkō yōshi came into common use in the middle of the Meiji period with the rising importance of newspapers and magazines, and the attendant need to count characters precisely.

=== Spread to Taiwan, Korea, Taiwan, and China ===
After Japan's late-Meiji overseas expansion the square-grid genkō yōshi format spread throughout its colonies and areas of cultural influence:

- Taiwan under Japanese rule between 1895 and 1945, local stationers imported and re-printed ten- and eleven-line 原稿紙 (yuāngǎozhǐ) notebooks. Surviving wartime diaries show Taiwanese writers filling these blue- or red-ruled grids by the 1940s.
- Korea soon after annexation in 1910, the paper was adopted in colonial schools and newsrooms and became known as wongoji(원고지). By the 1940s the 200 character (20×10) format came into common use in schools, newspapers, and the literary world. Korea's shift to horizontal writing in 1996 led publishers to issue horizontally ruled format, but the rapid diffusion of personal computers in the late 1990s made the use of wongoji largely obsolete.
- China Japanese-educated editors and returning students introduced the 400-character grid 稿紙 (gǎozhǐ) to Shanghai and Beijing publishing houses in the 1920s. By the early People's Republic period the red-ruled 400-character sheet had become the standard for literary manuscripts. In the People's Republic of China, the nationwide script-reform campaign of 1956—marked by the first official Scheme for Simplifying Chinese Characters and a government order to set text left-to-right standardised a horizontal 400 character (20x20) format. This grid paper is still issued in primary as the default exercise paper for handwriting and composition practice.

== Rules for use ==
While genkō yōshi can be used for horizontal writing, it is most commonly used for vertical writing, which is read from right to left. The first page is therefore the right hand side of the sheet. The title is placed on the first column, usually leaving two or three leading blank spaces. The author's name is placed on column 2, with an empty square or two below and an empty square between the given and family names. The first sentence begins on column 3 or 4.

Each paragraph, including the first one, is usually indented by a square. However, when writing quoted text such as direct speech, the opening quotation mark (﹁ or ﹃ in vertical writing) is placed in the first square of the column.

Like printed vertical Japanese, full stops, commas, and small kana are placed in the top right corner of their own square. In Chinese, they are placed in the middle of the square. All punctuation marks, other marks (such as parentheses), and small kana usually occupy their own square, unless this would place them at the top of a new column, in which case they share the last square of the previous column with the character in that square. (This is the kinsoku shori rule.) A full stop followed directly by closing quotation mark are written in one square. A blank square is left after non-Japanese punctuation marks (such as exclamation points and question marks). Ellipses and dashes use two squares.

Furigana and Bopomofo are written to the right of the relevant character, in small print.

Words, phrases, and sentences in Western characters (such as Roman letters) except acronyms like USA and NATO are often, but not always, written vertically by turning the page a quarter turn counterclockwise, so that when the page is viewed normally they are sideways. Each square can accommodate two Western characters.

== Genkō yōshi and manga ==
Manga artists and other illustrators also use a special type of genkō yōshi called manga genkō yōshi. This paper is printed with very light blue lines which do not show up when copied, and there are several varieties, each with a different type of printed grid. These are also available in different weights and sizes.

== See also ==
- Shitajiki
- Washi
- Loose leaf
- Ruled paper
- Writing paper
- Gunsho Ruijū - Genkō yōshi was born from this books' printing plate.
