= Chinese punctuation =

Punctuation used with Chinese characters

Chinese punctuation is the punctuation system used in writing of Chinese. The standard in all Sinophone regions, including mainland China, Taiwan, Hong Kong, Singapore, are almost the same.

== History ==
The earliest prototype of punctuation in Chinese can be found in oracle bone script. In Guo Moruo's work General Anthology of Divination Inscriptions (卜辞通纂, a collection of oracle bone script, written in 1933), in the 430th text, it showed from left to right "癸卯卜 癸丑卜 癸丑卜" which has 2 lines between them. These lines help to make texts independent. In Eastern and Western Han Dynasty, there were 13 punctuations observed in the sources. This proved that early Chinese had already started to use punctuations; however, due to a lot of reasons, e.g. ignorance from government, lack of standard system, punctuation is still not common-seen in old Chinese texts. This is the reason for students in Ancient Chinese that they had to learn ju dou (simplified Chinese: 句读; traditional Chinese: 句讀; pinyin: jù dòu), the skill of punctuating texts.

Nonetheless, because Chinese texts were generally not transmitted with any punctuation, there are passages, even in famous texts, where the "correct" or intended punctuation are ambiguous. As a result, the meaning of the text can also be ambiguous. For example, this passage "卒為善士則之野有眾逐虎" in Mencius 7B "Wholeheartedly" (孟子·盡心下) has been punctuated as "卒為善士。則之野。有眾逐虎。; 'Ultimately', 'he became a great gentleman. Thereupon he went to the countryside. There was a crowd in pursuit of a tiger'"; or as "卒為善。士則之。野有眾逐虎。; 'Ultimately', 'he became great. Gentlemen took him as a model. In the countryside there was a crowd in pursuit of a tiger.'"; or as "卒為善士則。之野。有眾逐虎。; 'Ultimately', 'he became a model for great gentlemen. He went to the countryside. There was a crowd in pursuit of a tiger.'". The first was given by the Han dynasty scholar Zhao Qi (趙岐) and was the traditional reading accepted by Song scholar Zhu Xi, Qing scholar Jiao Xun, etc. The second reading is favored by 13th-century scholars Liu Changshi (劉昌詩), Zhou Mi, etc. The third reading is proposed by modern scholars Wang Changlin (2002, 64) as well as Qin Hualin & Ling Yu (2005, 31).

The reform of punctuation had already started in 1904, when Yan Fu, a prolific translator, suggested a system modelled after European languages, a proposition that eventually caught on when Hu Shih and Wang Yuanfang presented a punctuated edition of Water Margin in 1920. The first book to be printed with modern punctuation was Outline of the History of Chinese Philosophy (中國哲學史大綱) by Hu Shih, published in 1919.

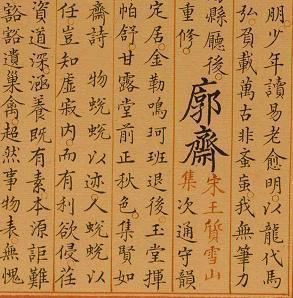
Examples of handwritten punctuation (circles in red ink) at the bottom-right or -center of characters. From the Yongle Encyclopedia.

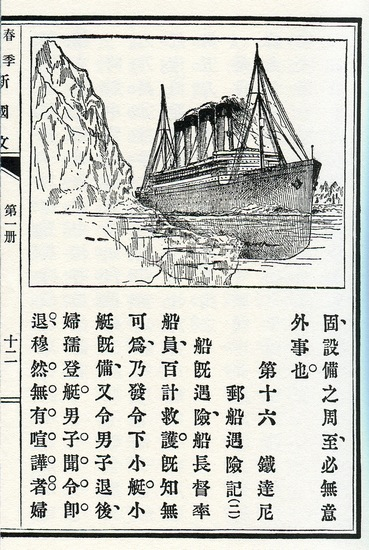
1912 textbook of the Republic of China's Commercial Press depicting the sinking of the Titanic, with punctuation marks to the right of characters

Since 2011, the use of punctuation in mainland China is regulated by Chinese national standard GB/T 15834–2011 "General rules for punctuation" (标点符号用法; biāodiǎn fúhào yòngfǎ).

== List of punctuation ==
The table is based on GB/T 15834–2011 "General rules for punctuation", the document by Standardization Administration of China, mainland Chinese government. If the difference exists in Hong Kong, Taiwan, or other Chinese-speaking world, it will be labeled out.

Use of Chinese punctuations
Punctuation	Chinese name	English name	Use	Example sentence
。	句号	fullstop	1. End of a sentence.; 2. The sentence is declarative; can also be used in the exclamational sentences or questions which have a more smooth tone.	1. 这是一个句子。; 2. 这对他来说是一个问题吗。
，	逗号	comma	1. In the middle of a sentence to show the stop of tone.; 2. Use after a long subject or object.; 3. After the vocative part, like calling of one's name.; 4. If the object is before subject.; 5. Add a descriptive sentence of the subject, similar to English subordinate clause.	1. 因此，我需要你。; 2. 世界卫生组织和美国国立卫生研究所，发表了以下的建议。; 3. 陈教授，您过来一下！; 4. 腹带鼠，我看到了！; 5. 吉米·威尔士，维基百科的创始人，来到了会场。
、	顿号	enumeration comma	1. Write a list of nouns.; 2. Write between the repeated words.; 3. Write a list with using Chinese numerals.; No use in: 1. In numbers, if it is not an abbreviation of a number.; 2. Between quotation marks.	1. 苹果、香蕉、西瓜和橙子都是水果。; 2. 看呀、看呀！; 3. 一、这缺乏法律依据 二、没有更早的判例; No: 1. 一、九六零年; 2. 《哈姆雷特》《罗密欧与朱丽叶》都是莎士比亚的作品。
——	破折号	em dash	1. Showing the longer sound.; 2. Add the explanation between two sentences.; 3. Showing a transition.	1. 啊——这真是太惊人了！; 2. 那位先生——小明认识很多年的——在一家建筑公司上班。; 3. 我的东西在这里——咦，去哪了？
！	感叹号	exclamation mark	End of an exclamory sentence.	这真是太容易了！
？	问号	question mark	End of a question.	你真的看不懂吗？
：	冒号	colon	1. Before a statement, a speech, a quotation.; 2. Summary of previous text.; 3. Before the word needed to explain.; 4. In a letter, archive, showing the speech of someone.	1. 鲁迅先生说过：“横眉冷对千夫指，俯首甘为孺子牛。”; 2. 被告：陈小明 原告：陈大明 审判官：王磊明; 3. 王莽：新朝的创造者。; 4. 彼得：我认为……
；	分号	semicolon	1. Use the stop between parallel sentences but a sentence is not finished yet.; 2. Showing the turning point in non-parallel sentences.; 3. Show the segmentations in listing.	1. 在经济学上，这是可行的；但在逻辑学上，这是不可行的。; 2. 你说他聪明，但是他无法理解勾股定理的概念；你说他不聪明，他又能理解起诉书的内容。; 3. 一、我认同；二、小明不认同。
（）	括号	parenthesis	1. Add extended description.	
……	省略号	ellipsis	1. For omission.	
“”	双引号	quotation mark	General use.: 1. Quotation.; 2. Sarcasm of literal meaning.	1. 他问道：“什么意思？”; 2. 他真是一个“仁义”的人。
‘’	单引号	quotation mark	Use within quotation mark.	“请问，‘新自由主义’是什么意思？”
《》	书名号	quotation mark	Use only for book titles.	《求是》
﹏﹏	書名號	quotation mark	Non-standard form in mainland China. One of two standard forms in Taiwan.	
·	间隔号	middle dot	1. For foreign, minority, to split the non-Han names. Not in quotation mark for book (《》) because of the use in 3.; 2. Splitting a date.; 3. In quotation mark for book (《》), it means the chapter.	1. 约翰·道伊; 2. 五·四运动; 3. 《圣经·新约·创世纪》
文	专名号	proper noun underline	In mainland China, only use in old texts.	孔子，本名孔丘，字仲尼，鲁国人也。
字 ·	着重号	emphasis	Giving emphasis.	

Marks imported from Europe are fullwidth instead of halfwidth like their original European counterparts, thus incorporating more space, and no longer need to be followed by an additional space in typesetting:

- ⟨ ⟩ (U+3000 FULLWIDTH SPACE) is the space, but takes the width of a full hanzi.
- ， (U+FF0C FULLWIDTH COMMA) is the comma (,). It cannot be used for enumerating a list; see "enumeration comma" below.
- ！ (U+FF01 FULLWIDTH EXCLAMATION MARK) is the exclamation mark (!).
- ？ (U+FF1F FULLWIDTH QUESTION MARK) is the question mark (?).
- ； (U+FF1B FULLWIDTH SEMICOLON) is the semicolon (;).
- ： (U+FF1A FULLWIDTH COLON) is the colon (:).
- （ ） (U+FF08 FULLWIDTH LEFT PARENTHESIS), (U+FF09 FULLWIDTH RIGHT PARENTHESIS) are parentheses (round brackets).
- There are two kinds of square brackets:
  - ［］ (U+FF3B FULLWIDTH LEFT SQUARE BRACKET), (U+FF3D FULLWIDTH RIGHT SQUARE BRACKET)
  - 【 】 (U+3010 LEFT BLACK LENTICULAR BRACKET), (U+3011 RIGHT BLACK LENTICULAR BRACKET)

Other punctuation symbols are more different, in shape or usage:

=== More details ===
==== Period (。) ====
The Chinese period (U+3002 IDEOGRAPHIC FULL STOP) is a fullwidth small circle (simplified Chinese: 句号; traditional Chinese: 句號; pinyin: jùhào; lit. 'sentence mark'). In horizontal writing, the period is placed in the middle 。, however in Mainland China it is placed in the bottom left 。; in vertical writing, it is placed below and to the right of the last character ︒(U+FE12 PRESENTATION FORM FOR VERTICAL IDEOGRAPHIC FULL STOP) in Mainland China, and in the middle 。 in Taiwan, Hong Kong, and Macau.

==== Quotation marks (「…」 , ﹁…﹂ , “…”) ====
Traditional Chinese does not use European quotation marks. Its double and single quotation marks are fullwidth 『 』 (U+300E LEFT WHITE CORNER BRACKET, U+300F RIGHT WHITE CORNER BRACKET) and 「 」 (U+300C LEFT CORNER BRACKET, U+300D RIGHT CORNER BRACKET). The double quotation marks are used when embedded within single quotation marks: 「…『…』…」. In vertical text, quotation marks are rotated 90° clockwise (﹁…﹂ (U+FE41 PRESENTATION FORM FOR VERTICAL LEFT ANGLE BRACKET, U+FE42 PRESENTATION FORM FOR VERTICAL RIGHT CORNER BRACKET)).
Simplified Chinese officially prescribes European-style quotation marks for horizontal text and Chinese quotation marks for vertical text. Single quotation marks are used when embedded within double quotation marks: “…‘…’…”.
These quotation marks are fullwidth in printed matter but share the same codepoints as the European quotation marks in Unicode, so they require a Chinese-language font to be displayed correctly. In vertical text, corner brackets rotated 90° clockwise (﹃…﹁…﹂…﹄), are used similar to Traditional Chinese but in reverse clamping order, with double quotation on the outside and single quotation on the inside. However, corner brackets are commonly encountered in situations that normally necessitate European punctuation, including in official contexts and media.

==== Enumeration comma (、) ====
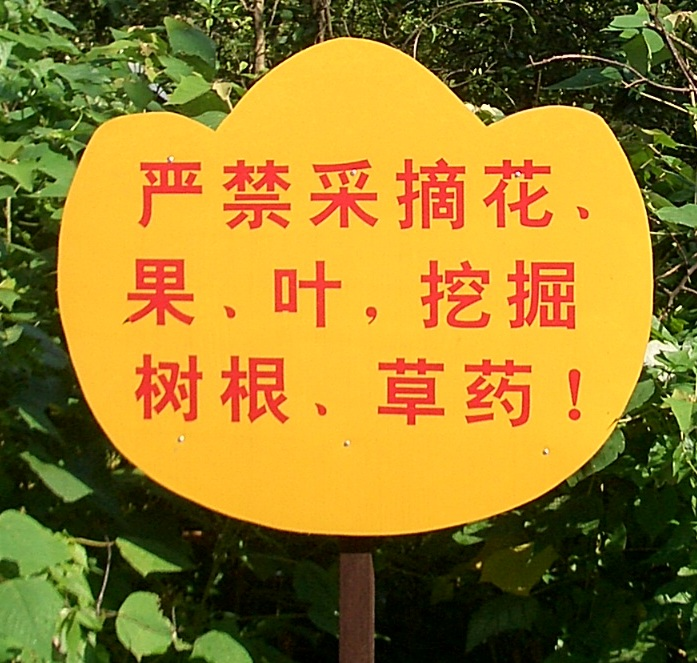
A sign in a Zhuhai park. Meaning: "It is strictly forbidden to grab flowers, fruits, or, leaves; or to dig roots or medical plants!"

The enumeration comma (U+3001 IDEOGRAPHIC COMMA) or "dun comma" (simplified Chinese: 顿号; traditional Chinese: 頓號; pinyin: dùnhào; lit. 'pause mark') must be used instead of the regular comma when separating words constituting a list.
Chinese language does not traditionally observe the English custom of a serial comma (the comma before conjunctions in a list), although the issue is of little consequence in Chinese at any rate, as the English "A, B, and C" is more likely to be rendered in Chinese as "A、B及C" or more often as "A、B、C", without any word for "and", see picture to the right.

==== Middle dot (·) ====
Chinese uses a middle dot to separate characters in non-Han personal names, such as Tibetan, Uyghur, etc. For example Nur Bekri (نۇر بەكرى), the name of a Chinese politician of Uyghur descent, is rendered as "努爾·白克力". "Leonardo da Vinci" is often transcribed into Mandarin as 李奧納多・達・文西. The middle dot is also fullwidth in printed matter, while the halfwidth middle dot [·] is also used in computer input, which is then rendered as fullwidth in Chinese-language fonts.
In Taiwan, the hyphenation point ([‧], U+2027 HYPHENATION POINT) is used instead for the same purpose. They can also be used to represent decimal points in Chinese. For example "3.5" becomes 「三‧五」.

==== Title marks (《…》, 〈…〉, ﹏﹏﹏) ====
For titles of books, films, and so on, Simplified Chinese officially uses fullwidth double angle brackets 《 》 (U+300A LEFT DOUBLE ANGLE BRACKET, U+300B RIGHT DOUBLE ANGLE BRACKET), and fullwidth single angle brackets 〈 〉 (U+3008 LEFT ANGLE BRACKET, U+3009 RIGHT ANGLE BRACKET).
The latter is used when embedded within the former: 《…〈…〉…》. Although ﹏﹏﹏ (wavy underline, U+FE4F WAVY LOW LINE) is the officially prescribed title mark by Taiwan's Ministry of Education (especially for handwriting), when typing, square brackets 【 】 and double quotation marks 『 』 are also de facto used, if not prescribed by dictionaries in a manner akin to Korean and Japanese; Simplified Chinese often does likewise for song titles. In practice, Traditional Chinese, single title marks are also used for articles in or sections of a book, a rule that is also officially prescribed for Simplified Chinese.
Furthermore, unsanctioned and alternate usage of Western or Chinese quotation marks is rather common, especially so for Chinese quotation marks in Traditional Chinese newspapers; this "unsanctioned practice" is also commonly found in Japanese and Korean.

==== Ellipsis (……) ====
In Chinese, the ellipsis is written with six dots (not three) occupying the same space as two characters in the center of a line.
Unicode provides an explicitly centered U+22EF ⋯ MIDLINE HORIZONTAL ELLIPSIS character in addition to the inexplicit U+2026 … HORIZONTAL ELLIPSIS character.

==== Two-em dash (⸺) ====
Similarly, the two-em dash (U+2E3A ⸺ TWO-EM DASH) is written so that it occupies the space of two em dash characters in the center of the line. There should be no breaking in the line. To represent the two-em dash character ([⸺]), one can write two consecutive em dashes ([——], U+2014 U+2014). Chinese dash is Chinese: 破折號; pinyin: pòzhéhào; lit. 'Break/Fold Mark'.

==== En dash (–) ====
When connecting two words to signify a range, Chinese generally uses an en dash occupying the space of one character (e.g. 1月—7月 "January to July", which can also be written 1月至7月, with the character 至 in place of the dash). A single em dash character or a tilde may also be used.

==== Wave dash (～) ====
The wave dash (U+301C 〜 WAVE DASH, simplified Chinese: 浪纹; traditional Chinese: 浪紋; pinyin: làng wén) is used in the Chinese language to signify a numerical range (e.g. 5～20個字 "5 to 20 words"). Additionally, there is another Unicode character called the fullwidth tilde (U+FF5E ～ FULLWIDTH TILDE, Chinese: 全形波浪號; pinyin: quán xíng bōlàng hào) which is often used as an alternative form of the wave dash symbol. The wave dash is more commonly but not exclusively used when the numbers are estimates (e.g. circa dates and temperatures in weather forecasts).
For the most part, however, the en dash and wavy dash are interchangeable; usage is largely a matter of personal taste or institutional style. Note that the wave dash ([〜]) and the fullwidth tilde ([～]) should not be confused with the wavy dash character (U+3030 〰 WAVY DASH, simplified Chinese: 浪线; traditional Chinese: 浪線; pinyin: làng xiàn). In Japanese, the wavy dash is used as an emphatic form of the katakana-hiragana prolonged sound mark.
In informal use (such as texting), wavy dashes are also used to indicate a prolonged vowel similar to informal English's repeated letters (e.g. 哇～～ "waaah") or to indicate stress in places where English would employ an emphatic tone marked variously by italics or bolding (e.g. 要～～ "I want it!").

==== Spacing ====
Similar to the spacing between letters (kerning) in European languages, Chinese writing uses a very narrow space between characters, though it does not observe the equivalent to the wider space between words except on rare occasions. Chinese – particularly classical Chinese – is thus a form of scriptio continua and it is common for words to be split between lines with no marking in the text equivalent to the English hyphen.
When a space is used, it is also fullwidth (U+3000 IDEOGRAPHIC SPACE: ⟨ ⟩).
One instance of its usage is as an honorific marker. A modern example in 20th century Taiwan, is found in the reference to Chiang Kai-shek as 先‌總‌統 蔣‌公 (Former President, Lord Chiang), in which the preceding space serves as an honorific marker for 蔣公. This use is also still current in very formal letters or other old-style documents, as well as religious scripture.

==== Asterisk ( * ) ====
Mainland Chinese supply chains often use an asterisk in place of a multiplication sign (×) to specify product dimensions. For example "10×200×350" becomes "10*200*350".

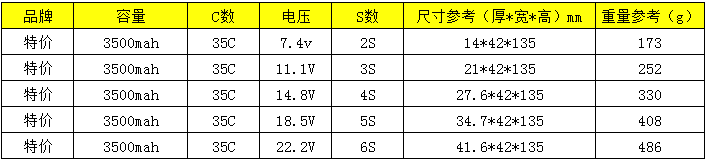
Example of Chinese products using asterisks as punctuation for product dimensions

=== Typographic styles ===
The following are commonly suggested typographical styles; however, they are rarely carried out in practice and often only used when necessary. Proper name marks and title marks are primarily used in textbooks and official documents in Hong Kong, Macau, and Taiwan.

Proper name mark ( __ )
A proper name mark (an underline) is occasionally used, especially in teaching materials and some movie subtitles. When the text runs vertically, the appropriate name mark is written as a line to the characters' left (to the right in some older books).
Title mark ( ﹏﹏ )
A title mark is a wavy underline (﹏﹏, U+FE4F WAVY LOW LINE) used instead of the regular book title marks whenever the proper noun mark is used in the same text.
Emphasis mark
For emphasis, Chinese uses emphasis marks instead of italic type. Each emphasis mark is a single dot placed under each character to be emphasized (for vertical text, the dot is placed to the right-hand side of each character). Although frequent in printed matter, emphasis marks are rare online, as most word processors do not support them. However, support in HTML has been possible by adding the CSS property text-emphasis-style.
Death-indication mark ( 姓名)
A death-indication mark (simplified Chinese: 示亡号; traditional Chinese: 示亡號; pinyin: shìwánghào) marks a person's recent death. Typographically, it consists of a black border around the person's name. It is supported by most word processors and is supported in CSS through the border property. It is used in lists or bibliographical data, for example. Lin Suifang (林穗芳) suggests that this practice may have entered the Chinese language in the fifties when it was supposedly adopted from translations from Russian; he does not cite any sources for this statement, however.

=== Apostrophe ===
There is no equivalent of the apostrophe in Chinese. Therefore, it is omitted in translated foreign names such as "O'Neill". Likewise, the hyphen is used only when writing translated foreign names with hyphens. Otherwise, it is not used in Chinese and is omitted when translating compound words.

== See also ==
- Punctuation
- Chinese character
- Chinese literature
- East Asian punctuation
- Japanese punctuation
- Korean punctuation
- Vietnamese punctuation
- Line breaking rules in East Asian languages
