= Vietnamese punctuation =

Vietnamese punctuation (Vietnamese: chấm câu) refers to the usage of punctuation marks in Vietnamese texts.

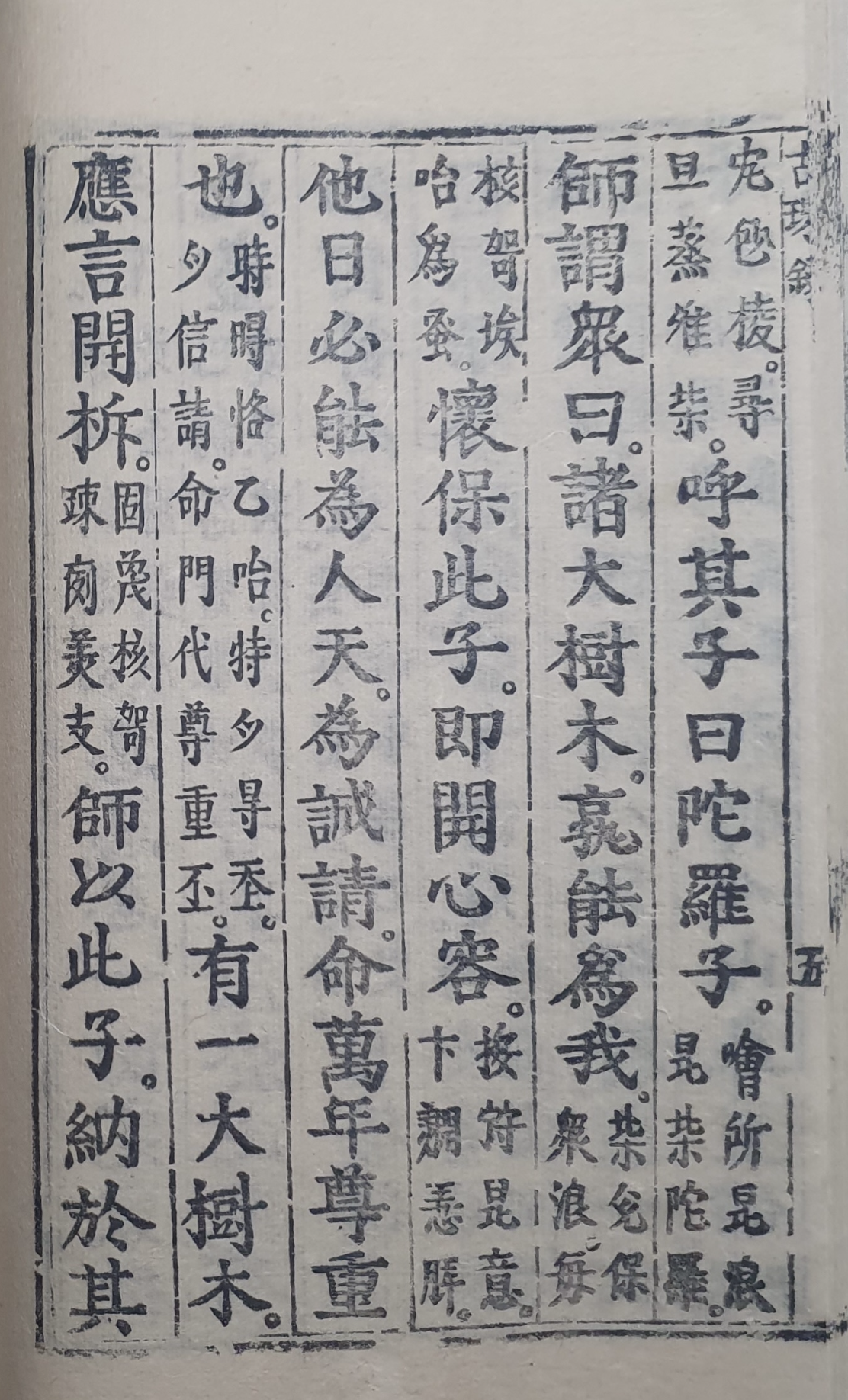
A page from Cổ Châu Pháp Vân Phật bản hạnh ngữ lục 古珠法雲佛本行語錄. Punctuation marks can be see used right of characters.

== Historical punctuation ==
Historically, the Vietnamese language was written using chữ Nôm, a script that incorporated both Chinese characters and locally invented characters to represent native Vietnamese words. This writing system coexisted with Literary Chinese (Hán văn), which was the primary medium for official documents, scholarly works, and formal communication in Vietnam.

Text featured marks referred to as gia điểm (chữ Hán: 加點), these marks were largely based on Chinese practices.

- 句 (cú) - a mark that indicates a full stop (。) at the end of a sentence. It is typically a circle or a dot in the bottom-right.
- 讀 (đậu) - a mark that indicates a pause (、) similar to a comma. It is typically a dot or a circle in the bottom-right.

The usage of these two punctuation marks has some flexibility, varying between manuscripts. In some cases, both marks are positioned at the bottom right of the character, while in others, the mark 句 (cú) appears at the bottom right, and 讀 (đậu) is placed at the bottom center. These usages may differ, there were also manuscripts that were not punctuated. Scholars had to either rely on line breaks in the text called 斷句 (đoạn cú) or their mastery of Literary Chinese grammar.

=== Annotation marks ===
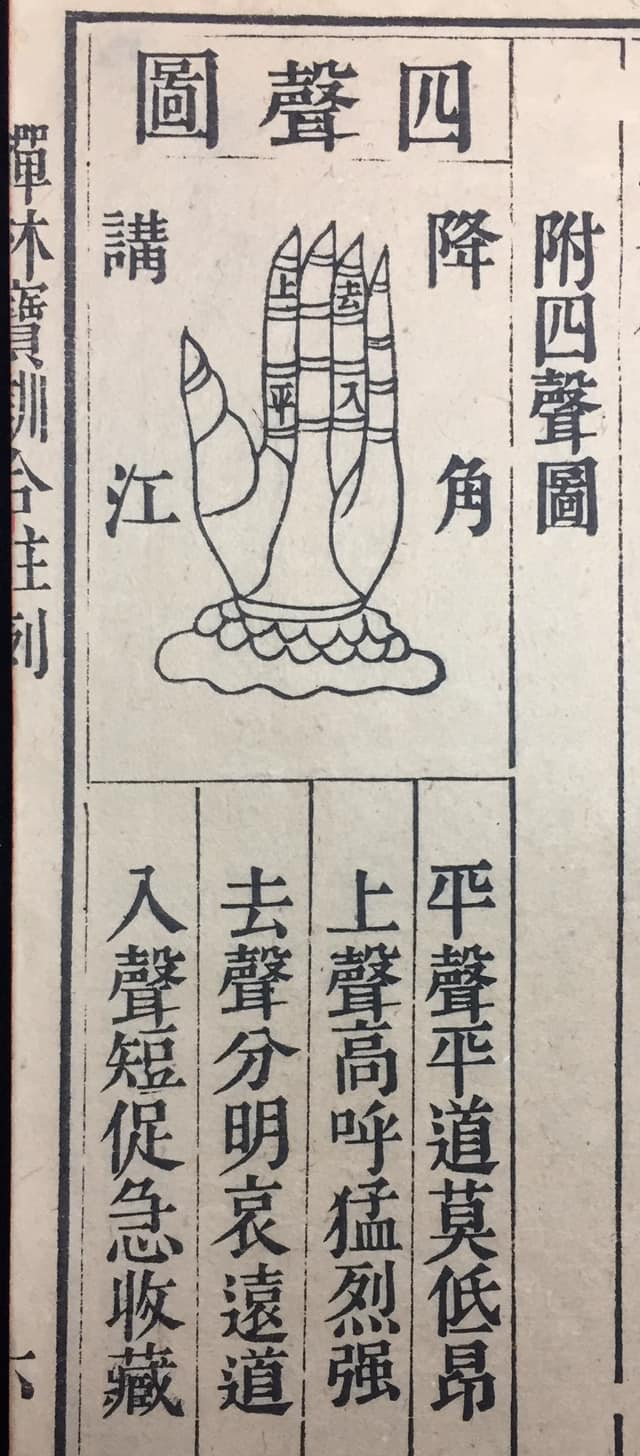
A diagram of the four tones indicate which corners represent which tones.

There were also marks (𧿫 dấu) to denote alternative pronunciations, grammar, and errors.

- 𧿫圈頭 (dấu khuyên đầu) - These marks were used to indicate what tone was to be used for the character. Circles are drawn at the four corners of the character indicating which tone it should be. For example: 分 (phận - the mark is written top-left, phần - the mark is written bottom-right, and phân - the mark is written bottom-right).
- 𧿫草𢶸 (dấu tháu đấm) - a pair of two marks used for shorthand. Often used in Vietnamese cursive, it either could represent repeated characters or a radical. An example is 頭 being written as (⿲丶豆丿).
- 𧿫聯珠 (dấu liên châu) - Continuous dots or circles along a sentence to highlight its importance, a type of emphasis mark.
- 𧿫塗抹 (dấu đồ mạt) - If a single character is marked with three dots, it signifies an error or mistake and the character is deleted.
- 𧿫亇 (dấu cá) 𖿰 and 𧿫𥅘 (dấu nháy) 𖿱 - These marks were used in written Vietnamese to indicate that the character was being used a phonetic approximation thus should be read with a different reading.
- 𧿫乙 (dấu ất) - a mark similar to a vertical tilde (~) placed between two characters to indicate reversal of characters.
- dấu vòng - an open circle mark used for respected figures.
- 𧿫點𤽗 (dấu chấm ngươi) - similar to the dấu vòng, it is used for common people. A dot is used between the characters.
- 𧿫竪 (dấu sổ) - the slash mark indicates place names, dynasties.
- 𧿫扦 (dấu xen) - a mark (フ) that indicates that a character (in small gloss) is to be inserted.

Although undergoing current research, it has also been theorized that Vietnamese Literary Chinese texts were read in Vietnamese similar to Japanese kanbun kundoku with annotation marks (レ) appearing on the bottom-left after introductory topic phrases. Examples include marks marking 者 giả and 而 nhi are supposed to be read as thì and mà.

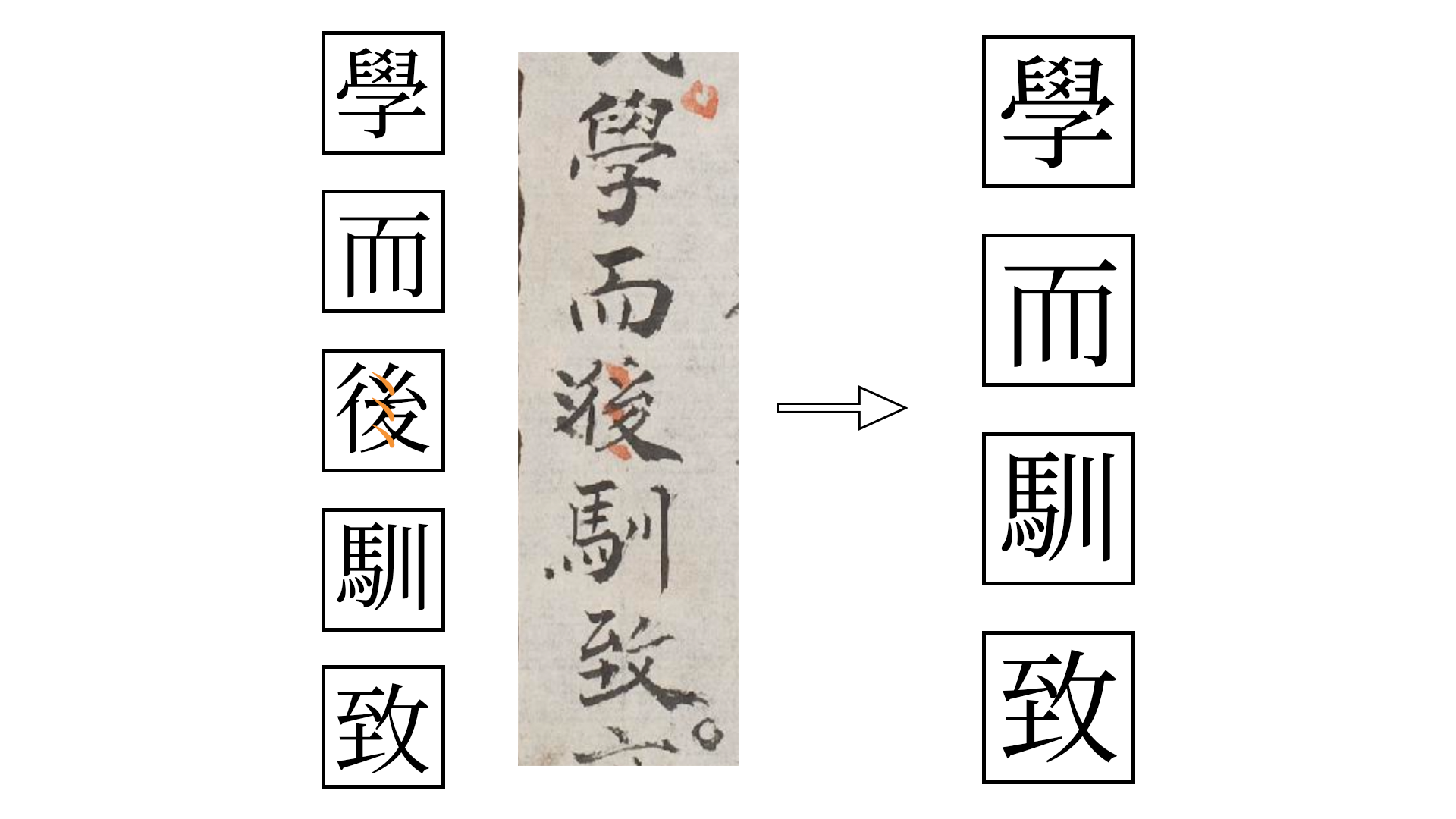
塗抹 (đồ mạt) mark deleting the character 後.

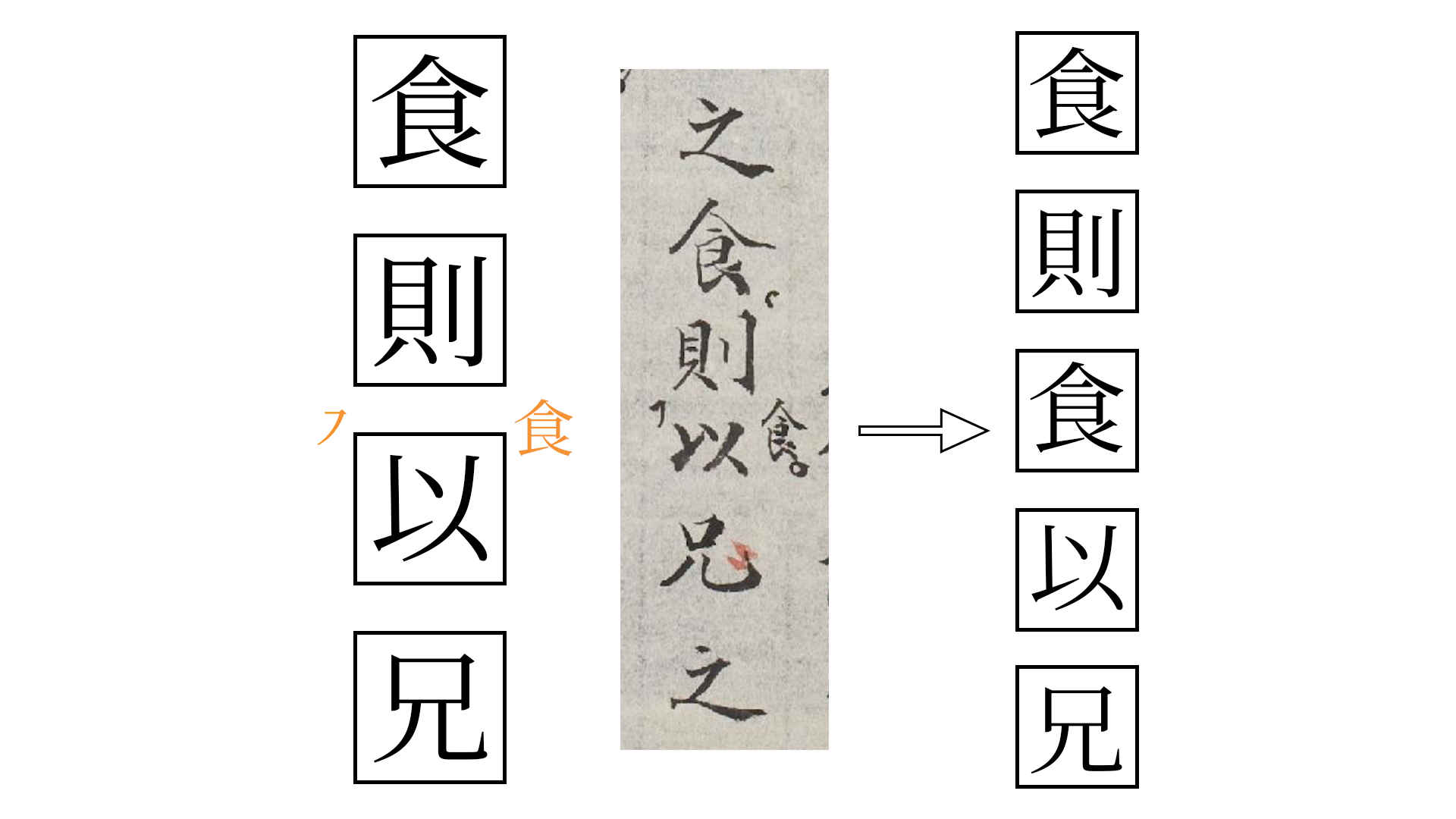
Dấu xen inserting the character 食.

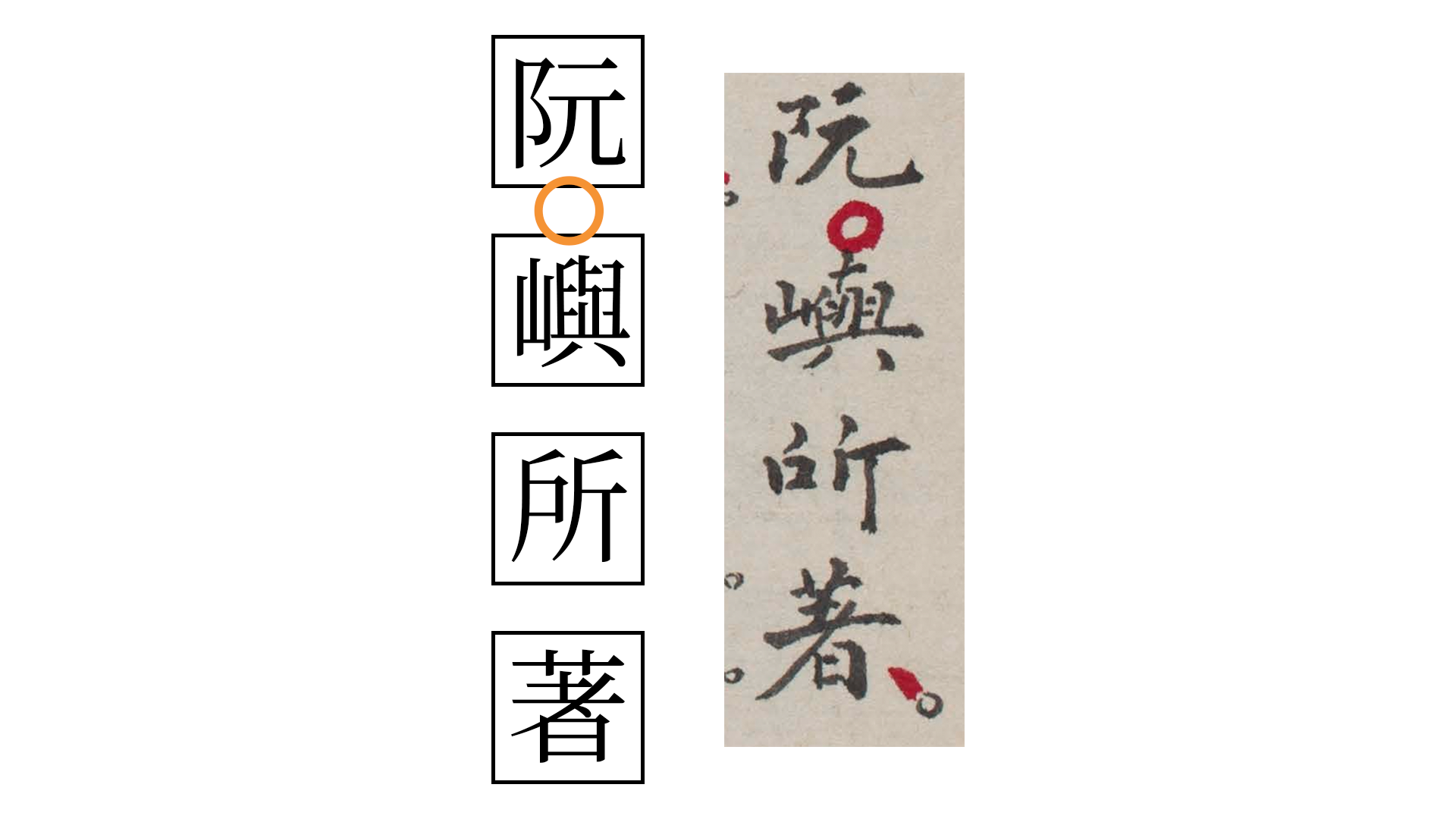
Dấu vòng marking Nguyễn Dữ's name (阮嶼).

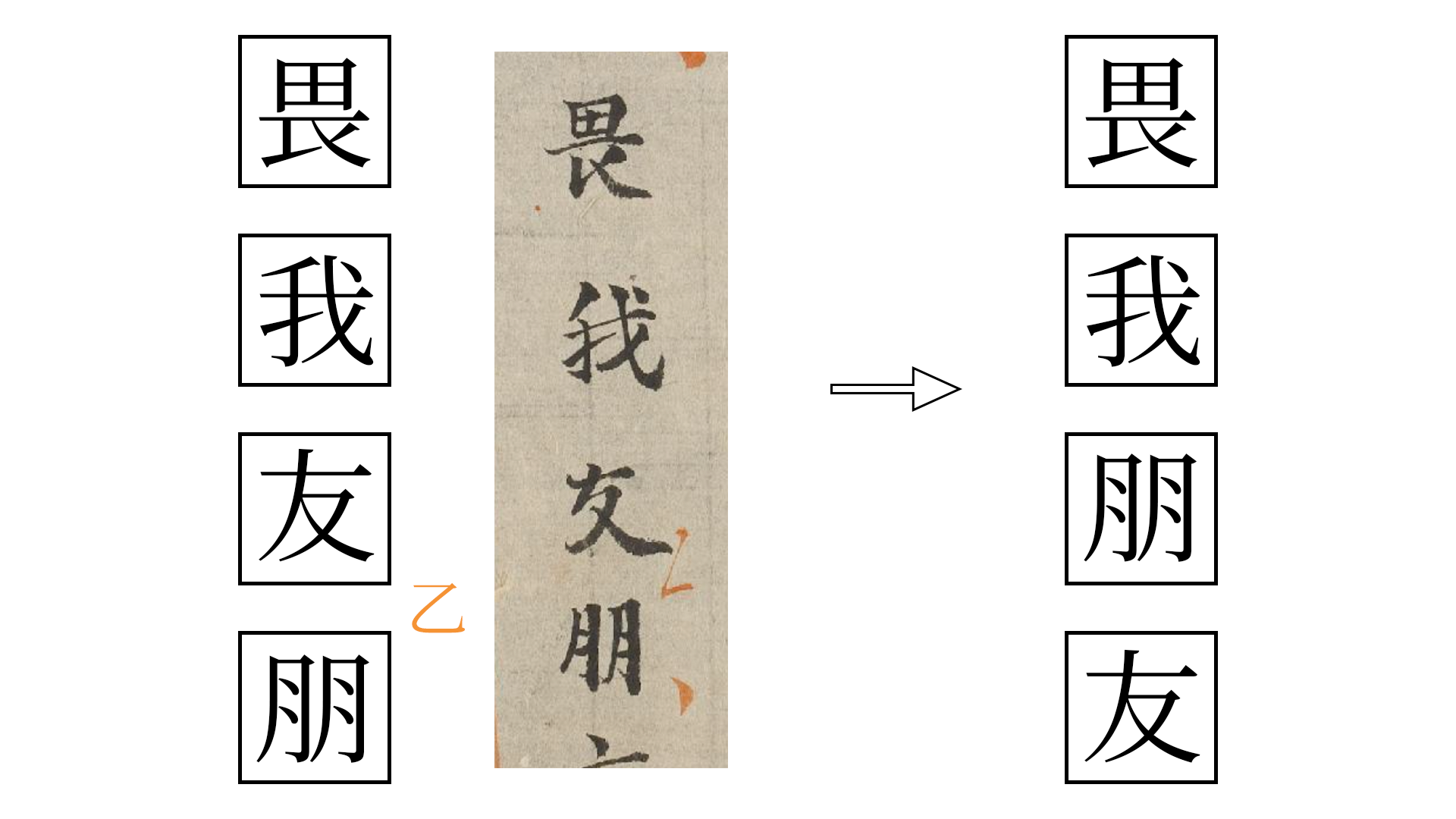
An 乙 (ất) mark reversing the order of 友朋 to 朋友.

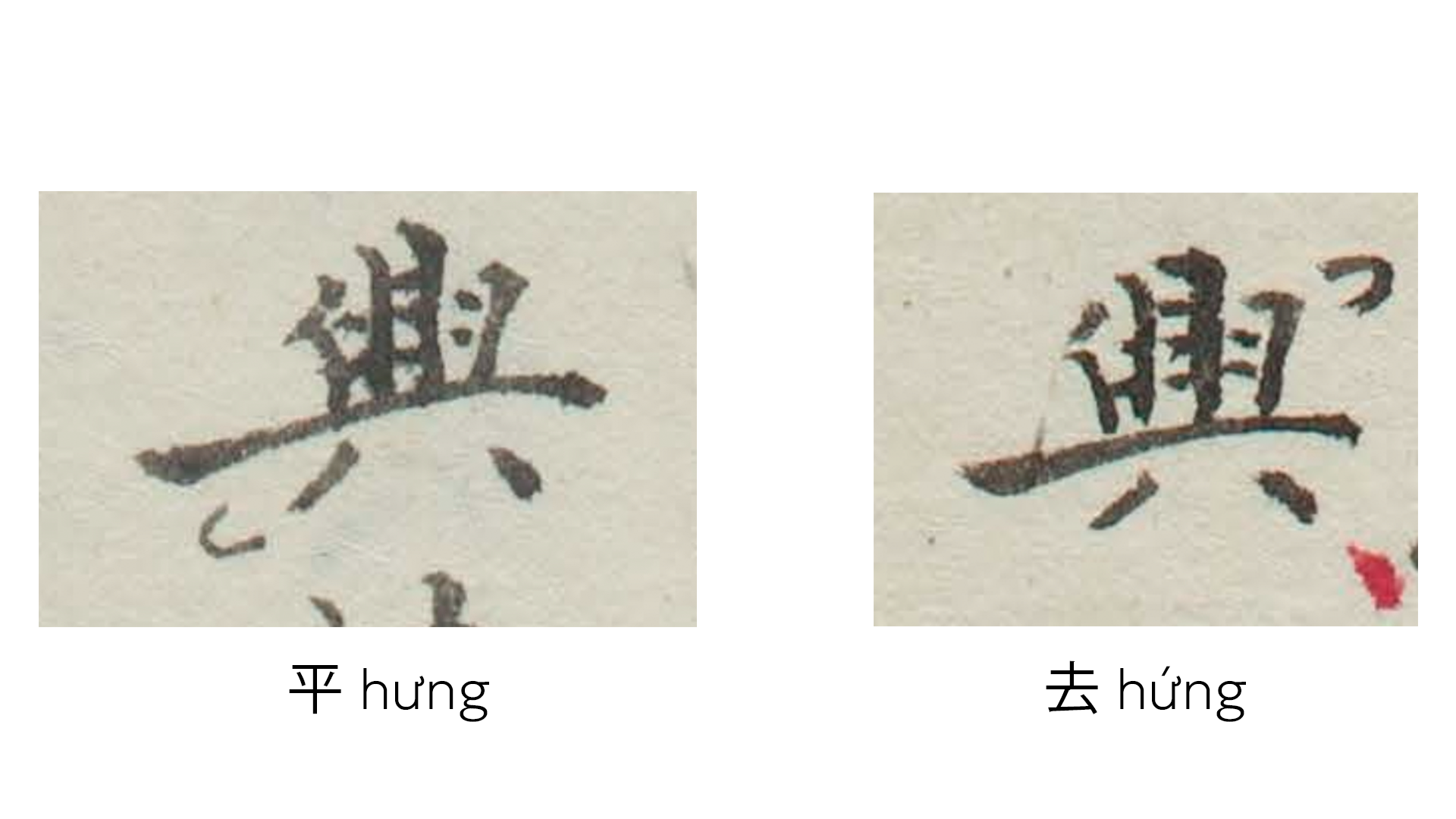
圈頭點 (dấu khuyên đầu) showing what tone the reading should be.

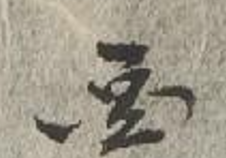
The character đầu (頭) written with 草𢶸 (dấu tháu đấm).

== Modern punctuation ==
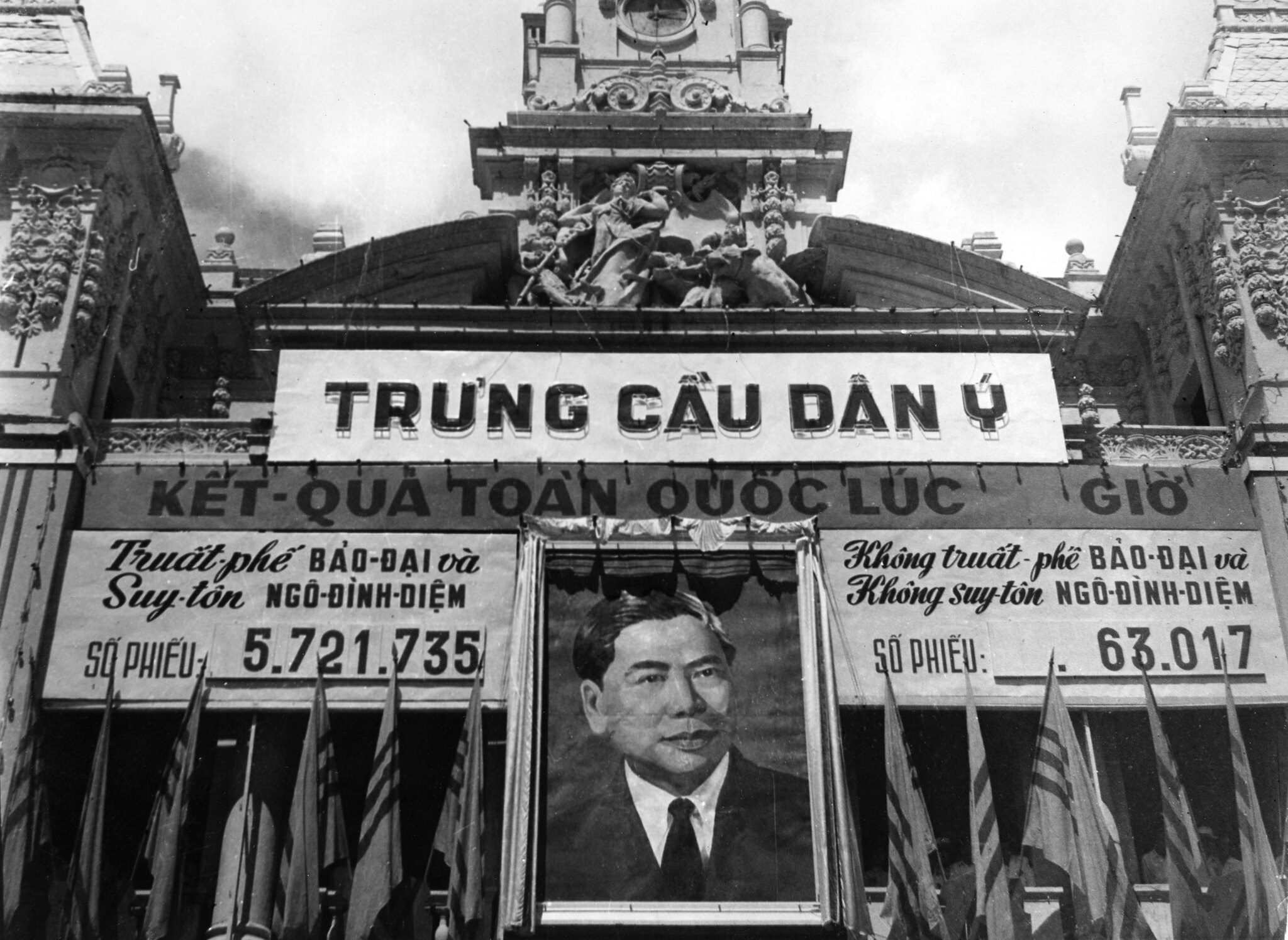
The results of the 1955 State of Vietnam referendum were displayed at the Saigon City Hall. There are compound words that were written with a hyphen, "truất phế" ("dethrone"), "suy tôn" ("worship"), and "kết quả" ("result") are written as "truất-phế", "suy-tôn", and "kết-quả" respectively.

After Vietnam switched to the Vietnamese alphabet, European punctuation was adopted in favor of traditional punctuation.

- dấu chấm - period, full stop (.); used to mark end of a sentence.
- dấu hỏi - question mark (?); used at the end of an interrogative sentence.
- dấu chấm than (dấu cảm) - exclamation mark (!); used to express strong emotions, commands, or exclamations.
- dấu lửng - ellipsis (...); indicates an unfinished thought, hesitation, or omitted words.
- dấu phẩy - comma (,); Separates elements in a sentence, clarifies meaning, or indicates a pause.
- dấu chấm phẩy - semicolon (;); used to separate clauses in a complex sentence or list items that contain commas.
- dấu hai chấm - colon (:); introduces an explanation, a list, or a quotation.
- dấu (gạch) ngang - dash (—); used to mark the boundary of a parenthetical element.
- dấu gạch nối - hyphen (-); used to link all syllable in polysyllabic loanwords e.g. Niu-tơn (Newton).
  - It was also used to link multiple syllables in compound words and names (including nicknames, art names, place names, and location names.), especially during the period when Latin Script (Chữ Quốc Ngữ) started to be used. However, the usage of hyphens for linking compound words wasn't consistent, universal, and standardized, some writers or authors will use it consistently while others may use it relatively, partially, or omitted entirely. Nowadays, especially after 1975, Vietnamese texts in both Vietnam and overseas rarely use hyphens to connect compound words.

Article 1 of the Universal Declaration of Human Rights in Vietnamese.
| With hyphens (May be inaccurate) | Without hyphens |
|---|---|
| Tất-cả mọi người sinh ra đều được tự-do và bình-đẳng về nhân-phẩm và quyền-lợi. Mọi con người đều được tạo hóa ban cho lý-trí và lương-tâm và cần phải đối-xử với nhau trong tình anh-em. | Tất cả mọi người sinh ra đều được tự do và bình đẳng về nhân phẩm và quyền lợi. Mọi con người đều được tạo hóa ban cho lý trí và lương tâm và cần phải đối xử với nhau trong tình anh em. |

- dấu ngoặc đơn - parentheses ('); encloses additional information or clarifications.
- dấu ngoặc kép - quotation marks ("); used to enclose direct speech, quotes, or special terms.

== See also ==
- Chinese punctuation
- Korean punctuation
- Emphasis mark
