= East Asian punctuation =

East Asian punctuation can refer to:

- Chinese punctuation
- Japanese punctuation
- Korean punctuation
- CJK Symbols and Punctuation (Unicode block)
- Halfwidth and Fullwidth Forms (Unicode block)
