= Chinese punctuation for proper nouns =

Punctuation used to mark proper nouns in Chinese

Modern versions of the Chinese language have two kinds of punctuation marks for indicating proper nouns: the proper name mark / proper noun mark (simplified Chinese: 专名号; traditional Chinese: 專名號) and the book title marks / title marks (simplified Chinese: 书名号; traditional Chinese: 書名號). The former may be applied to all proper nouns except when the nouns in question are titles of textual or artistic works, in which case the latter are used instead. While there are two variants of the book title mark, the proper name mark comes in one form only.

== Old-school style ==
The old-school style uses two different underlines. The proper name mark appears as a straight underline ＿, while the book title mark appears as a wavy underline ﹏. In vertical writing, the mark is placed on the left side of characters (︳ or ︴).

In Taiwan, this form of the book title mark is called "Type A" (甲式) in contrast to "Type B" (乙式), 《 and 》 (to be described later). In China, only type B book title marks are accepted in modern day use. On the other hand, the proper name mark is a straight underline in both Taiwan and China.

When a proper noun immediately follows another, the lines accompanying each of them do not connect; however, many digital systems are unable to correctly display this break.

The old-school style proper name marks were an official rule in Taiwan and Hong Kong earlier. However, since the old-school style is hard to typeset, it has fallen into disuse except in traditional Chinese school textbooks or in Classical Chinese text that has been re-laid out in a modern style.

=== Example ===
屈原放逐，乃賦離騒。左丘失明，厥有國語。

Translation: Qu Yuan was exiled, the Li Sao was thus composed. Zuo Qiu (or Zuoqiu (Note: There are debates on whether the name 左丘明 has surname 左 and given name 丘明 (Zuo Qiuming) or surname 左丘 and given name 明 (Zuoqiu Ming).)) lost his sight, hence there is the Guo Yu.

== Popular styles ==
The popular style uses a pair of angle brackets for book title marks, which are intended to surround the title of a piece of textual or artistic work. There are two kinds of angle brackets available. The double angle brackets (《》) and single angle brackets (〈〉). In horizontally aligned texts, 《》 and 〈〉 were used as book title marks. In vertically-aligned text, the rotated forms of the above-mentioned symbols (︽⋯︾) and (︿⋯﹀) are used instead. The proper noun mark is not defined in popular styles both in Taiwan and China.

The choice between single and double-angle brackets is vary. In Taiwan's Traditional Chinese, it is according to the format of the textual or artistic work – in general, double-angle brackets are for works that stand by themselves, which would be italicized if they were in English text, whereas single-angle brackets are for sections or chapters in the work. In Mainland China's Simplified Chinese, double-angle brackets should always be used. The single-angle brackets only appear between double-angle brackets to indicate a title within another title.

The popular style of book title mark is called type B in Taiwan, while the angle brackets are the only acceptable style in China for modern day use.

Since these symbols are processed as individual characters, there are virtually no difficulties for digital systems to display them correctly. These styles are dominant amongst both printed and digital Chinese text.

In Japanese language, 『 』 are usually used as book title mark.

=== Example ===
In Taiwanese usage:

《史記》是司馬遷所著的一本綜合體史書，其中〈項羽本紀〉寫項羽只信舊族姻親，不能用謀士范增，以至敗亡的歷史經驗。

Rough translation: Shiji is an overview-type history book written by Sima Qian. The "Basic Annals of Xiang Yu" chapter in the book is about how Xiang Yu trusts his old-day relatives instead of his advisor Fan Zeng which leads to his defeat.

In Chinese usage:

《教育部关于提请审议〈高等教育自学考试试行办法〉的报告》

Translation: The report of the Ministry of Education on Proposing about the "Interim Measures for self-taught higher education".

== Unicode ==
- U+FF3F ＿ FULLWIDTH LOW LINE
- U+FE4F ﹏ WAVY LOW LINE
- U+FE33 ︳ PRESENTATION FORM FOR VERTICAL LOW LINE
- U+FE34 ︴ PRESENTATION FORM FOR VERTICAL WAVY LOW LINE
- U+300A 《 LEFT DOUBLE ANGLE BRACKET
- U+300B 》 RIGHT DOUBLE ANGLE BRACKET
- U+3008 〈 LEFT ANGLE BRACKET
- U+3009 〉 RIGHT ANGLE BRACKET
- U+300E 『 LEFT WHITE CORNER BRACKET
- U+300F 』 RIGHT WHITE CORNER BRACKET

== See also ==
- Chinese punctuation, the topic in general.
- Interpunct, used to mark divisions in proper names in Chinese
- Tai tou, an honorific space sometimes inserted before a person's name as a mark of respect
