= Emphasis mark =

East Asian typographical markings

The dropdown for emphasis marks in Microsoft Word.

The emphasis mark, emphasis dot, kenten (圏点) or boten (傍点, bōten) is a typographic mark used in some East Asian languages to indicate emphasis. The markings can take many forms, such as dots or bullets, circles, or triangles. They were more commonly used historically, but with the rise of modern technology, it is now common to use quotation marks or change the font style.

== Chinese ==
An example of emphasis mark used in traditional vertical style writing.

An example of emphasis mark used in traditional horizontal style writing.

1. 事業是幹出來的，不是吹出來的。
2. 看來，他彷佛用一千隻眼睛瞧著。

In China and Hong Kong, the emphasis mark (Chinese: 着重号) is used in textbooks and teaching materials. It is centred under each character highlighted in the horizontal texts, and centred to the right of each character in the vertical texts.

== Japanese ==
ここを強調

In Japan, the emphasis mark (傍点 bōten or 圏点 kenten) is usually a dot or a sesame dot and is centred above each character in the horizontal texts and to the right of each character in the vertical texts.

It is not unusual for kenten and ruby to concur on the same side of the main text (usually above or to the right).

== Korean ==
In South Korea, the emphasis mark (드러냄표 deureonaempyo) usually rules as a dot or circle centred above the characters in the horizontal texts and to the right of the characters in the vertical texts.

Examples:

- using the CSS text-emphasis property:
  한글의 본 이름은 훈민정음이다.
  중요한 것은 왜 사느냐가 아니라 어떻게 사느냐 하는 문제이다.
- using positioned characters: :
  한글의 본 이름은 •훈•민•정•음이다.
  중요한 것은 ◦왜 ◦사◦느◦냐◦가 아니라 ◦어◦떻◦게 ◦사◦느◦냐 하는 문제이다.

== Vietnamese ==
In Vietnam, the emphasis mark (dấu nhấn mạnh) was written with various marks such as a dot, circle, or a sesame dot. It is commonly positioned to the right of the character. After Vietnam switched to the Latin alphabet, emphasis marks fell into disuse as bolding, underlining, and italics replaced the usage of emphasis marks.

- 定𫜵科次固𱺵𡗶空
  Định làm khoa thứ có là trời không

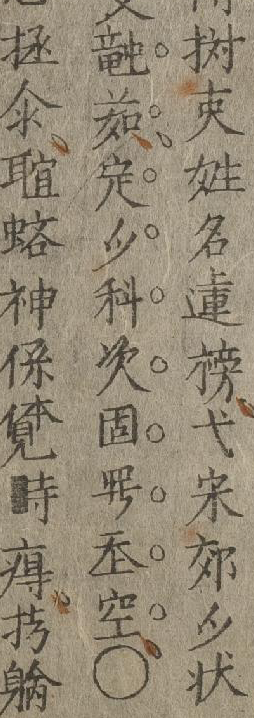
Emphasis marks used to mark words in the Vietnamese book, Âm chất giải âm 隂騭解音.

== Characters ==
Apart from any single character, the following characters are used as emphasis marks in some implementations.

Glyph	Unicode codepoint	Unicode name	Value for the CSS text-emphasis-style property	Name used in Adobe InDesign
•	U+2022	bullet	dot, filled, filled dot	small black circle
◦	U+25E6	white bullet	open, open dot	small white circle
●	U+25CF	black circle	circle, filled circle	black circle
○	U+25CB	white circle	open circle	white circle
◉	U+25C9	fisheye	double-circle, filled double-circle	fisheye
◎	U+25CE	bullseye	open double-circle	bullseye
▲	U+25B2	black up-pointing triangle	filled triangle, triangle	black triangle
△	U+25B3	white up-pointing triangle	open triangle	white triangle
﹅	U+FE45	sesame dot	filled sesame, sesame	black sesame
﹆	U+FE46	white sesame dot	open sesame	white sesame

== See also ==
- Chinese punctuation
- Japanese punctuation
- Korean punctuation
