= Underscore =

Typographic symbol (underline)

_ ◌̲o

Underscore
- In Unicode: U+005F _ LOW LINE (&lowbar;, &UnderBar;); U+0332 ◌̲ COMBINING LOW LINE

Graphical variants
- ＿
- U+FF3F ＿ FULLWIDTH LOW LINE

Different from
- Different from: U+0331 ◌̱ COMBINING MACRON BELOW

Related
- See also: U+2017 ‗ DOUBLE LOW LINE; U+2381 ⎁ CONTINUOUS UNDERLINE SYMBOL; U+2382 ⎂ DISCONTINUOUS UNDERLINE SYMBOL; U+FE33 ︳ PRESENTATION FORM FOR VERTICAL LOW LINE

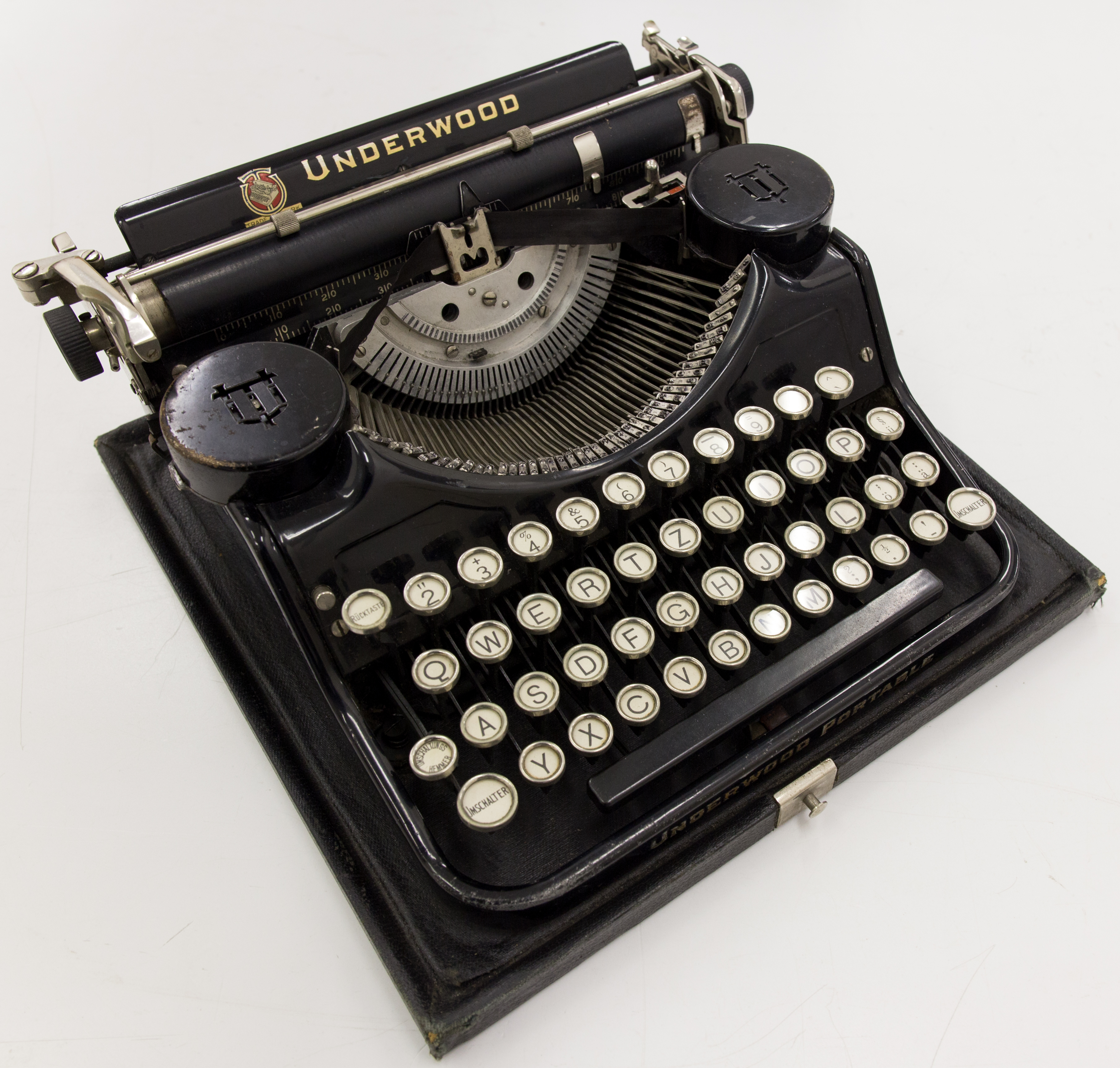
Underlining was developed for mechanical machines like this Underwood typewriter which had no bold or italic type. The only way to emphasize text that was typewritten was to back up the carriage and type underscores beneath the text. Underlining was a workaround for shortcomings in typewriter technology.

Underscored or underlined text.

An underscore or underline is a line drawn under a segment of text. (Note: Honeywell used the word zot for the symbol.) In proofreading, underscoring is a convention that says "set this text in italic type", traditionally used on manuscript or typescript as an instruction to the printer. Its use to add emphasis in modern finished documents is generally avoided.

The (freestanding) underscore character, _, also called a low line, or low dash, originally appeared on the typewriter so that underscores could be typed. To produce an underscored word, the word was typed, the typewriter carriage was moved back to the beginning of the word, and the word was overtyped with the underscore character.

In modern usage, underscoring is achieved with a markup language, with the Unicode combining low line or as a standard facility of word processing software. The free-standing underscore character is used to indicate word boundaries in situations where spaces are not allowed, such as in computer filenames, email addresses, and in Internet URLs, for example Mr_John_Smith.

== Diacritic ==
The combining diacritic, U+0331 ◌̱ COMBINING MACRON BELOW, is similar to the combining low line but is shorter. The difference between "macron below" and "low line" is that the latter results in an unbroken underline when it is run together: compare a̱ḇc̱ and a̲b̲c̲ (only the latter should look like abc). (Note: This text describes how 'low line' should be implemented and in most cases it usually is (for example, Windows+Firefox, ChromeOS+Chrome). However, it has been observed that the Chrome Browser on at least some releases of Android fails to do so correctly and the line is broken. This is an implementation error.)

== Modern use ==
In a manuscript (or typescript) to be typeset, various forms of underlining (see below) were therefore conventionally used to indicate that text should be set in special type such as italics, part of a procedure known as markup. In printed documents underlining is generally avoided, with italics or small caps often used instead, or (especially in headings) using capitalization, bold type or greater body height (font size). Underlining may still be seen in display work.

A series of underscores (like __________ ) may be used to reserve a blank space in text that is later to be filled in by hand, such as on a paper form. It is also sometimes used to create a horizontal line; other symbols with similar glyphs, such as hyphens and dashes, are also used for this purpose.

In German, Slovene and some other Slavic languages, the underscore has recently gained prominence as the punctuation to form gender-neutral suffixes in gendered nouns and other parts of the speech.

The underscore is also used in modern editions of Spanish vocal sheet music to indicate elision, instead of the breve below (U+032E ◌̮ COMBINING BREVE BELOW), which is less convenient to input on a computer.

== Mathematics ==
In mathematical notations, underscores are sometimes used in the following contexts:

- vectors. Underscores are sometimes used instead of bold face or a variable with an overarrow. E.g.: $\underline{v} = \mathbf{v} = \left[v_1\;v_2\right]^\mathbf{T}.$
- complex numbers. Similar to vectors, underscored variable names can indicate a complex-valued variable, especially if the real-valued variable name is reused to indicate the complex variable. For instance, in optics, $n$ is often used for a medium's index of refraction. When the refractive index has a wavelength-dependent extinction coefficient $\kappa$, the combined complex index of refraction is sometimes notated $\underline{n} = n + \mathrm{i}\kappa.$
- minimum bound. Example: $\underline{x} < x < \overline{x},$ where $\underline{x}$ is the lower bound of $x,$ and $\overline{x}$ is the upper bound.

== Usage in computing ==
In web browsers, default settings typically distinguish hyperlinks by underlining them (and usually changing their color), but both users and websites can change the settings to make some or all hyperlinks appear differently (or even without distinction from normal text).

=== History ===
As early output devices (Teleprinters, CRTs and line printers) could not produce more than one character at a location, it was not possible to underscore text, so early encodings such as ITA2 and the first versions of ASCII had no underscore. IBM's EBCDIC character-coding system, introduced in 1964, added the underscore, which IBM referred to as the "break character". IBM's report on NPL (the early name of what is now called PL/I) leaves the character set undefined, but specifically mentions the break character, and gives RATE_OF_PAY as an example identifier. By 1967 the underscore had spread to ASCII, replacing the similarly shaped left-arrow character, ← (see also: PIP). C, developed at Bell Labs in the early 1970s, allowed the underscore in identifiers.

Underscore predates the existence of lower-case letters in many systems, so often it had to be used to make multi-word identifiers, since camelCase (see below) was not available.

=== Programming conventions ===
Underscores inserted between letters are very common to make a "multi-word" identifier in languages that cannot handle spaces in identifiers. This convention is known as "snake_case" (the other popular method is called camelCase, where capital letters are used to show where the words start).

An underscore as the first character in an ID is often used to indicate an internal implementation that is not considered part of the API and should not be called by code outside that implementation. In Dart, all private properties of classes must start with an underscore; this usage is also common in other languages such as C++ even though those provide keywords to indicate that members are private. It is extensively used to hide variables and functions used for implementations in header files. In fact, the use of a single underscore for this became so common that C compilers had to standardize on a double leading underscore (for instance __DATE__) for actual built-in variables to avoid conflicts with the ones in header files. PHP "reserves all function names starting with __ [double underscore] as magical."

Python uses names that both start and end with double underscores (so called "dunder methods", as in double underscore) for magic members used for purposes such as operator overloading and reflection, and names starting but not ending with a double underscore to denote private member variables of classes which should be mangled in a manner which prevents them from colliding with members of derived classes unless the classes have the same name (__bar in class Foo will be mangled to _Foo__bar). By convention, members starting with a single underscore are considered private or protected, although this behavior only has inherent effect for modules, where import * statements by default import all names that do not start with an underscore, unless an export list is explicitly defined by the module.

A variable named with just an underscore often has special meaning. $_ or _ is the previous command or result in many interactive shells, such as those of Python, Ruby, and Perl. In Perl, @_ is a special array variable that holds the arguments to a function. In Clojure, it indicates an argument whose value will be ignored. In Python, it is sometimes used as a dummy variable, when its value is not important but the syntax requires it. In C#, it is used for discards, placeholder variables that are required by syntax but remain unassigned and not processed.

In some languages with pattern matching, such as Haskell and other ML-family languages, Rust, C#, Python, Prolog, and the Wolfram Language, the pattern _ matches any value, but does not perform binding, hence it can be reused multiple times in a single pattern and does not require declaration.

=== HTML <u> and CSS ===
The ASCII underscore character can be inserted with the entities &lowbar; or &UnderBar; (or &#95; or &#x5F;).

HTML has a presentational element <u> that was originally used to underline text; this usage was deprecated in HTML4 in favor of the CSS style {text-decoration: underline}. In HTML5, the tag reappeared but its meaning was changed significantly: it now "represents a span of inline text which should be rendered in a way that indicates that it has a non-textual annotation". This facility is intended for example to provide a red wavy line (or wiggly line) underline to flag spelling errors at input time but which are not to be embedded in any stored file (unlike an emphasis mark, which would be). Other styles are also available: doubled, dotted, and dashed.

The elements may also exist in other markup languages, such as MediaWiki. The Text Encoding Initiative (TEI) provides an extensive selection of related elements for marking editorial activity (insertion, deletion, correction, addition, etc.).

=== Unicode ===
Unicode has a free-standing underscore _ at U+005F, inherited from ASCII, which is a legacy of the typewriter practice of underlining using backspace and overtype. Modern practice uses the combining diacritic U+0332 ◌̲ COMBINING LOW LINE that results in an underline when paired with a conventional character. Unicode also has U+0333 ◌̳ COMBINING DOUBLE LOW LINE. In addition, there are single line and double line versions of the combining macron below, a diacritic that applies to single letters only.

Underlining methods and results
Effect	Using combining diacritic	Using html span style	Using macron below
single underline	a̲b̲c̲d̲e̲f̲g̲h̲i̲j̲k̲l̲m̲n̲o̲p̲q̲r̲s̲t̲u̲v̲w̲x̲y̲z̲0̲1̲2̲3̲4̲5̲6̲7̲8̲9̲	abcdefghijklmnopqrstuvwxyz0123456789	a̱ḇc̱ḏe̱
double underline	a̲̲b̲̲c̲̲d̲̲e̲̲f̲̲g̲̲h̲̲i̲̲j̲̲k̲̲l̲̲m̲̲n̲̲o̲̲p̲̲q̲̲r̲̲s̲̲t̲̲u̲̲v̲̲w̲̲x̲̲y̲̲z̲̲0̲̲1̲̲2̲̲3̲̲4̲̲5̲̲6̲̲7̲̲8̲̲9̲̲	abcdefghijklmnopqrstuvwxyz0123456789	
single underline	A̲B̲C̲D̲E̲F̲G̲H̲I̲J̲K̲L̲M̲N̲O̲P̲Q̲R̲S̲T̲U̲V̲W̲X̲Y̲Z̲	ABCDEFGHIJKLMOPQRTSUVWXYZ	A̱ḆC̱ḎE̱
double underline	A̲̲B̲̲C̲̲D̲̲E̲̲F̲̲G̲̲H̲̲I̲̲J̲̲K̲̲L̲̲M̲̲N̲̲O̲̲P̲̲Q̲̲R̲̲S̲̲T̲̲U̲̲V̲̲W̲̲X̲̲Y̲̲Z̲̲	ABCDEFGHIJKLMOPQRTSUVWXYZ	

=== "Simulated" underlines in plain-text ===
In plain-text applications, including plain-text e-mails where emphasis markup is not possible, the desired emphasis is often indicated by surrounding words with underscore characters. For example, "You must use _emulsion_ paint on the ceiling".

Some applications will automatically add emphasis to text manually bracketed by underscores, either by underlining or by italicizing it (e.g. _string_ may render as either string or string).

=== As a marker for incorrectness ===
Underline (typically red or wavy or both) is often used by spell checkers (and grammar checkers) to denote misspelled or otherwise incorrect text.

== Manuscripts ==
Depending on local conventions, the following kinds of underlines may be used inline on manuscripts to indicate the special typefaces to be used:

- single dashed underline for stet, 'let it stand', proof-reading mark cancelled.
- single straight underline for italic type
- single wavy underline for bold type
- double straight underline for small caps
- double underline of one straight line and one wavy line for bold italic
- triple underline for FULL CAPITAL LETTERS (used among small caps or to change text already typed as lower case).

== Underlines in Chinese ==
In Chinese, the underline is a little-used punctuation mark for proper names (simplified Chinese: 专名号; traditional Chinese: 專名號; pinyin: zhuānmínghào; literally "proper name mark", used for personal and geographic names). Its meaning is somewhat akin to capitalization in English and should never be used for emphasis even if the influence of English computing makes the latter sometimes occur. A wavy underline (simplified Chinese: 书名号; traditional Chinese: 書名號; pinyin: shūmínghào; literally, "book title mark") serves a similar function, but marks names of literary works instead of proper names.

In the case of two or more adjacent proper names, each individual proper name is separately underlined so there should be a slight gap between the underlining of each proper name.

== See also ==
- Overline
- Space Character
- Strikethrough
- Undertie
- Visible space
