= Korean punctuation =

The Korean language has used various writing systems with varying orthographies and punctuation over time. Writing systems that saw significant use for Korean include Hanja, Idu, Kugyŏl, Hyangch'al, and the Korean alphabet.

The Korean alphabet is now the dominant system in use in both North and South Korea. That alphabet is called Hangul internationally, Hangeul in South Korea, and Choson'gŭl in North Korea. Hangul orthography and punctuation have changed over time. The original punctuation system, kuduchŏm, was quite limited; circles were largely used to mark significant breaks in reading. Spaces between words were not used. Tone markings were used to indicate supposed tones of Middle Korean, although some scholars argued that Korean was instead a pitch-accent language.

Hangul punctuation practices were in flux until the late 19th and 20th centuries, when significant standardization efforts began. Western punctuation practices were largely adopted, although Hangul in both North and South Korea maintains some other East Asian and local practices.

== Punctuation of Hanja and related systems ==
In the traditional Korean system of writing, which was largely based on the Chinese writing system, punctuation was primarily used to make corrections or to help with the understanding of hanja, or Chinese characters. Some of the corrective punctuation marks included ⟨◦⟩ called kkiump'yo (끼움표), which was used for inserting, and ⟨▯⟩ called sakchebu (삭제부) which was used for deleting. The traditional writing system known as Kugyŏl, used punctuation to interpret Chinese characters in a way Korean speakers could understand. One of the marks used in Kugyŏl was a dot ⟨•⟩ called yŏktokchŏm (역독점), which was used to indicate reading order. The conclusion of an idea or thought was indicated by starting a new line of characters from the top, as opposed to the western style punctuation of periods and commas which had not been introduced yet.

== Hangul punctuation ==
=== Historical ===
The original punctuation system was called kuduchŏm (구두점; 句讀點). In the 15th century, a small circle was used to mark major phrasal and sentential/clausal endings. If the circle was placed in the center after a syllable, it marked the end of a major break within a sentence. If it was placed in the right corner of the cell of the final syllable, it possibly indicated either the end of a sentence or a rising tone indicating a pause for that final character.

==== Tone markings ====
Tone markings are used in this page of the Hunminjeongeum Eonhae

Tone markings, called pangchŏm (방점; 傍點; 'side dots'), were originally used in Hangul to indicate tones. They were marked by dots to the left of a Hangul character:

- Level tone (평성; 平聲) had no dots
- Departing tone (거성; 去聲) had a single dot ( 〮)
- Rising tone (상성; 上聲) had two dots ( 〯)
- Entering tone (입성; 入聲) does not receive its own dot indication. Hangul's creators argue it is implicit in certain words, but Ledyard reads this as implying Korean doesn't have a specific entering tone.

The writers of the Haerye designed this system because they thought that Middle Korean had tones, similar to those of Chinese. However, a number of modern scholars disagree with this. Several argue that Middle Korean was a pitch-accent language that had pitches, possibly two: high and low.

Several scholars have argued that the tone marking system was overly influenced by Chinese linguistics. Lee and Ramsey emphasize that, while the tone system was not perfectly suited to Korean, it was and is still useful and "accurately [represents] the Korean data".

Tone markings were widespread until their decline in the 16th century. Kim-Renaud argues that, by this point, pitches were relatively predictable, and thus marking them was redundant. Lee and Ramsey argue that, by the early part of that century, the same characters received different tone markings when compared to past texts, which indicates that the pitch system was in flux. By the 1580s, texts were being produced without tone markings. Sohn argues that all vowels that had a rising tone became long, whereas vowels with a high or low tone remained short.

==== Punctuation for transcriptions of foreign languages ====
Some texts, when using Hangul to transcribe foreign languages, used a variety of relatively unique punctuation for various purposes. Some commonalities were identified by linguist Sven Osterkamp. For several Hangul works on the Manchu and Mongolian languages, circles were used as diacritics to indicate unusual pronunciation. Also, as Hangul originally did not have spaces, Hangul transcriptions of Manchu and Mongolian indicated where spaces were in Manchu or Mongolian scripts using comma-like marks (resembling 、) to the lower right of the preceding character.

Some Hangul works on Japanese borrowed the dakuten diacritic from the Japanese script to indicate voicing.

=== Modern ===
The modern Korean punctuation system is largely based on European punctuation, with the use of periods (마침표; machimpyo), commas (쉼표; swimpyo), and question marks (물음표; mureumpyo).

==== South Korean punctuation ====
The South Korean orthography provides guidance on punctuation used in horizontal writing, and not those for vertical writing. Below is a summary of its guidance on punctuation (excluding those used very similarly in English).

- The interpunct (·), called gaundetjeom (가운뎃점), can be used to indicate a grouping of things inline, e.g. 금·은·동메달 (lit. 'gold, silver, and bronze medals').
- The fullwidth double quotation marks 『 』 (겹낫표; gyeomnatpyo) and the guillemet ≪ ≫ (Note: Using the exact characters used on the South Korean orthography website. The National Institute of Korean Language stated that it does not prescribe Unicode code points.) (겹화살괄호; gyeophwasalgwalho) are to be put around titles of major works, like books or newspapers. Double quotes (") can also be used for this purpose.
- The fullwidth single quotation marks 「 」 (홑낫표; honnatpyo) and angle brackets < > (홑화살괄호; hothwasalgwalho) are to be put around lesser titles, including subtitles, titles for works of art like paintings or songs, the names of businesses, the names of laws, etc. Regular single quotes can also be used for this purpose. E.g. <한강>은 사진집 ≪아름다운 땅≫에 실린 작품이다 (lit. ''Han River' is a work in the photo collection "Beautiful Land"').
- The tilde (~), called mulgyeolpyo (물결표), is used to indicate ranges of numbers or dates, as well as distances. A hyphen (-) can also be used for this purpose. E.g. 9월 15일~9월 25일 (lit. 'September 15 – September 25') or 서울~천안 정도는 출퇴근이 가능하다 (lit. 'A Seoul to Cheonan commute is doable').
- Emphasis marks (˙), called deureonaempyo (드러냄표), can be used to draw attention to information considered important. Single quotes (') and underlining can also be used for this purpose. E.g. 한글의 본 이름은 훈민정음이다 (lit. 'The original name for Hangul was Hunminjeongeum').
- Hiding marks (O, X), called sumgimpyo (숨김표), can be used to mask out content that is meant to be censored or redacted. E.g. 배운 사람 입에서 어찌 ○○○란 말이 나올 수 있느냐? (lit. 'How can the word *** come out of the mouth of a civilized person?').
- The ppajimpyo (빠짐표) is a square ( □ ) used to indicate a space where a character is missing or should be placed.

==== North Korean punctuation ====
The North Korean orthography gives the following guidance for horizontal writing:

- Guillemet《 》(인용표; inyongp'yo) are placed around quoted speech, titles of works, brand or product names, names of vehicles or vessels, and organization names.
- Angle brackets〈 〉(거듭인용표; kŏdŭbinyongp'yo) are used in place of guillemet when nested inside guillemet.
- Emphasis marks, called mitchŏm (밑점), are intended to draw attention to information considered important. They are single dots placed underneath each syllable being emphasized.
- Hiding marks (O, X, □), called sumgimp'yo (숨김표), can be used to mask out content that is meant to be censored or redacted.
- The ditto mark (〃), called kat'ŭmp'yo (같음표), is used to indicate repeated information.
- The tilde (~), called mulkyŏlp'yo (물결표), is used to indicate ranges of numbers or dates.

For vertical writing, the guidance is largely the same as horizontal writing. Some guidance is given on the placement and rotation of the preceding characters. For example, the comma and period are put on the bottom right of the preceding character (i.e. to the top right of the following cell). While the exclamation point and question mark are not rotated, most other punctuation marks are, like the tilde.

== See also ==
- Chinese punctuation
- Japanese punctuation
