= Line breaking rules in East Asian languages =

Rules of East Asian writing systems

The line breaking rules in East Asian languages specify how to wrap East Asian Language text such as Chinese, Japanese, and Korean. Certain characters in those languages should not come at the end of a line, certain characters should not come at the start of a line, and some characters should never be split up across two lines. For example, periods and closing parentheses are not allowed to start a line. Many word processing and desktop publishing software products have built-in features to control line breaking rules in those languages.

In the Japanese language, especially, the categories of line breaking rules and processing methods are determined by the Japanese Industrial Standard JIS X 4051, and it is called kinsoku shori (禁則処理).

== Line breaking rules in Chinese text ==
Line breaking rules for Chinese language have been described in the reference of Office Open XML, Ecma standard. There are rules about certain characters that are not allowed to start or end a line, such as below.

=== Simplified Chinese ===
- Characters that are not allowed at the start of a line :!%),.:;?]}¢°·'"†‡›℃∶、。〃〆〕〗〞﹚﹜！＂％＇），．：；？！］｝～
- Characters that are not allowed at the end of a line :$(£¥·'"〈《「『【〔〖〝﹙﹛＄（．［｛￡￥

=== Traditional Chinese ===
- Characters that are not allowed at the start of a line :!),.:;?]}¢·–— '"• 、。〆〞〕〉》」︰︱︲︳﹐﹑﹒﹓﹔﹕﹖﹘﹚﹜！），．：；？︶︸︺︼︾﹀﹂﹗］｜｝､
- Characters that are not allowed at the end of a line :([{£¥'"‵〈《「『〔〝︴﹙﹛（｛︵︷︹︻︽︿﹁﹃﹏

== Line breaking rules in Japanese text (kinsoku shori) ==
Line breaking rules of Japanese language are determined by JIS X 4051, Japanese Industrial Standard. It describes word wrap rules and processing rules for Japanese language documents. These rules are called kinsoku shori (禁則処理, literally prohibition rules processing).

=== Word wrap rules ===
==== Categories ====
Regarding prohibited characters, there are some conventions, known as "house rules", which are specific to individual publishers. The rules of some publishers contradict those of other publishers. For that reason, there are many conventions that are not supported by Western desktop publishing software tools, and that is the main cause of the growing demand of computerized phototypesetting systems.

===== Characters not permitted on the start of a line =====
- Closing brackets

)]｝〕〉》」』】〙〗〟'"｠»

- Japanese characters: chiisai kana and special marks

ヽヾーァィゥェォッャュョヮヵヶぁぃぅぇぉっゃゅょゎゕゖㇰㇱㇲㇳㇴㇵㇶㇷㇸㇹㇺㇻㇼㇽㇾㇿ々〻
(Note: The kana listed here are the small, combining forms. Full-size kana can appear at the beginning of a line.)

- Hyphens

‐゠–〜

- Delimiters

？ ! ‼ ⁇ ⁈ ⁉

- Mid-sentence punctuation

・、:;,

- Sentence-ending punctuation

。.

Note: kinsoku shori does not apply to Japanese characters while one line contains not enough characters.

===== Characters not permitted at the end of a line =====
- Opening brackets

([｛〔〈《「『【〘〖〝'"｟«

===== Do not split =====
- Characters that cannot be separated

—...‥〳〴〵

- Numbers
- Grouped characters

一昨日(おととい) (Kanji sequences that have ruby characters that do not have a clear mapping to the underlying kanji characters (jukujikun)

=== Processing rules ===
Burasage (Hanging punctuation)
Move punctuation character to the end of the previous line.
Oidashi (Wrap to next)
Send characters not permitted at the end of a line to the next line, increase tracking to pad out first line. Another use is to wrap a character from the first line with the goal of preventing a character that shouldn't start a line from coming first on the next line.
Oikomi (Squeeze)
Reduce tracking on the first line to pull a character not permitted at the start of a line from being the first character on the second line.
If the software does not have tracking ability, white space is sometimes added to the end of a line.
Do not split
Use Oidashi and Oikomi to process. If characters that can't be split up straddle the end of a line, move them in a block to the next line using Oidashi, or keep them all together on the previous line by using Oikomi.

== Line breaking rules in Korean text ==
Line breaking rules for Korean language have been described in the reference of Office Open XML, Ecma standard. There are rules about certain characters that are not allowed to start or end a line, such as below.

- Characters that are not allowed at the start of a line :!%),.:;?]}¢°’”′″℃〉》」』】〕！％），．：；？］｝￠
- Characters that are not allowed at the end of a line :$([\{£¥‘“〈《「『【〔＄（［｛￡￥￦

=== Korean standards related to line breaking rules ===
- KS X ISO/IEC 26300:2007, OpenDocument standard in Korea, describes hyphenation at the start or at the end of line in OpenDocument.
- KS X 6001, standard for file specification of Korean word processor intermediate document, describes rules for line breaking at the end of page.

== See also ==
- Word wrap
- Word processor
- Typography
- Chinese punctuation
