= Tai tou =

East Asian typographical honor

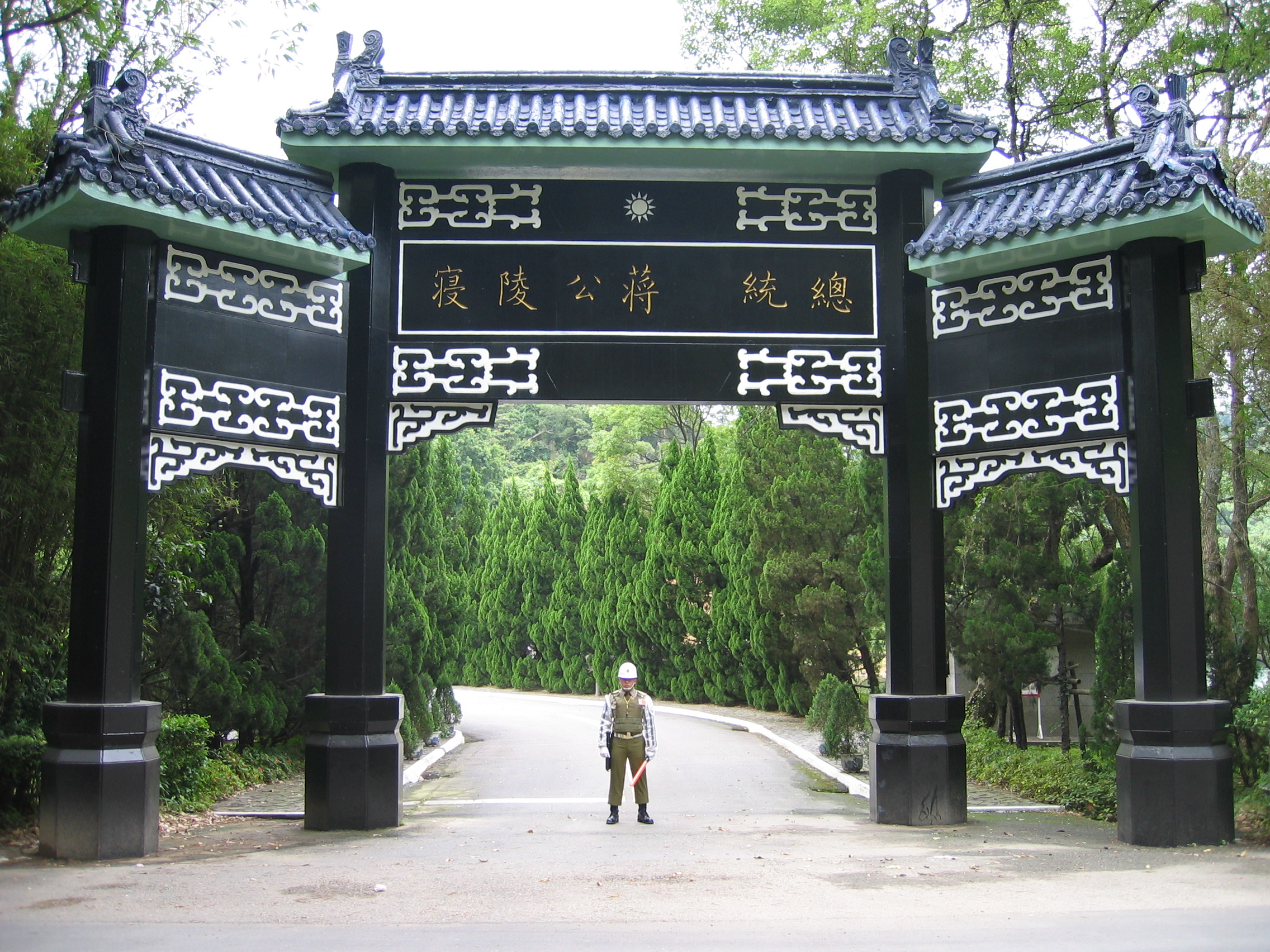
Example of a Nuo tai on the Paifang at the Cihu Presidential Burial Place in Taiwan. It reads (from right to left) "President (space) Honorable Chiang's Mausoleum"

Tai tou (Chinese: 抬頭; lit. 'shift/lift head') is a typographical East Asian expression of honor. It can be divided into two forms, Nuo tai and Ping tai.

== Nuo tai ==
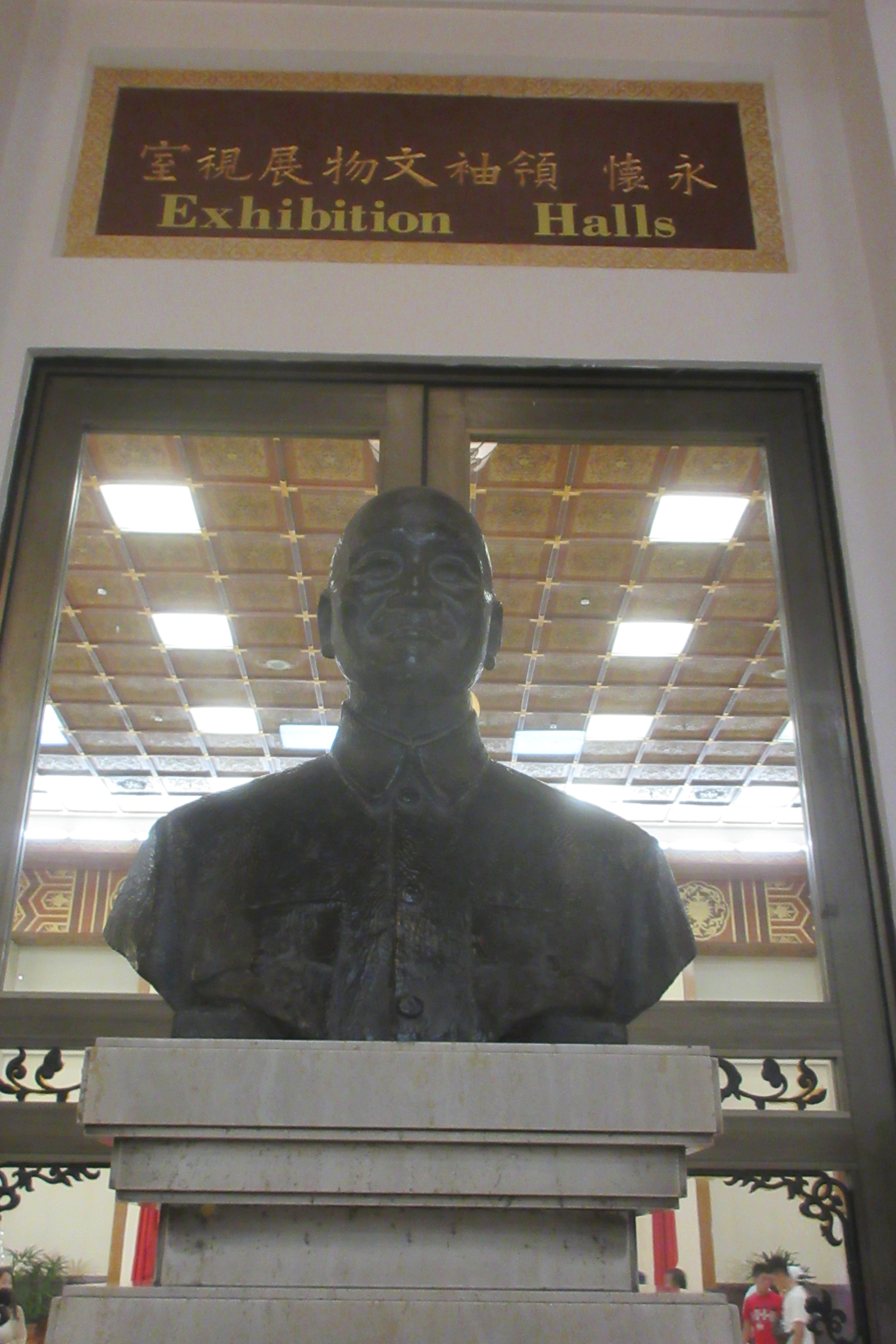
'永懷 領袖文物展視室' (Example of such a space used before the word '領袖', here referring to Chiang Kai-shek)

Nuo tai (Chinese: 挪抬, literally "move and shift") is a typographical device used in written Chinese to denote respect for the person being mentioned. It leaves a full-width (1 character wide) space before the first character of the person; it can be represented as Unicode character U+3000 IDEOGRAPHIC SPACE. This is often used in formal writing, particularly in Taiwan and Hong Kong, before using pronouns such as 貴 (guì, literally "precious, expensive", or "noble") to show respect. This is also sometimes still used in Taiwan for important officials, such as Chiang Kai-shek and Sun Yat-sen, although this practice has gradually fallen out of favor.

=== Examples ===
(reading left to right)

- 國父 孫中山先生 - Father of the Nation (space) Mr. Sun Yat-sen
- 先總統 蔣公 - The Late President (space) Honorable Chiang
- 起初 神創造天地 - In the beginning (space) God created the heaven and the earth. (In Chinese translations of the Bible, "God" is rendered in competing ways by different Christians: as 上帝 or 天主, which consists of two characters, or as 神, with only one. In order to avoid a complete re-typesetting of the entire text for this discrepancy, the publishers commonly shifted 神 so that it also took two spaces and the rest of the text could be typeset identically with 上帝.)

== Ping tai ==
Ping tai (Chinese: 平抬, literally "level shift") is another form. The way to express the respect is to shift the name of person directly to the head of the next line. This is now considered old-fashioned, and when it was used it was usually seen in documents sent between emperor and ministers when the minister mentioned the emperor.

== Dan tai ==
Dan tai (Chinese: 單抬, literally "single shift") is an archaic form where the shifted phrase is moved to a new line and begins one character above a normal line. Traditionally, this is used when the recipient of the letter is addressed.

== Shuang tai ==
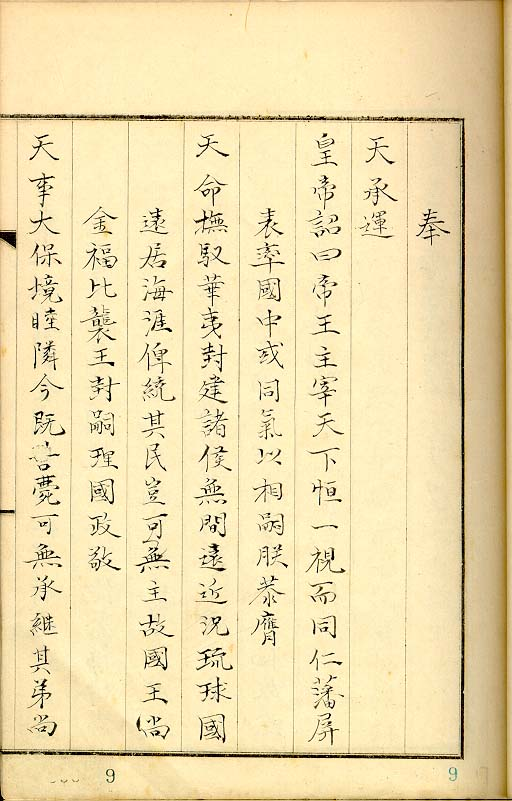
Rekidai Hōan from Ryukyu Kingdom was written in Chinese. Shuang Tai format can be clearly seen in the text.

Shuang tai (Chinese: 雙抬, literally "double shift") as above, but two characters above a normal line. This is used to denote respect for the recipient's parents and other elders. In official texts, this is used when the words emperor (帝) and empress (后) appear.

== San tai ==
San tai (Chinese: 三抬, literally "triple shift") as above, but three characters above a normal line; since Chinese writers customarily leave a margin of two characters for tai tou from the paper border, a san tai would require the first character to appear outside of the page borders. Such a practise is used for characters denoting the divine, such as Heaven, Earth, and deceased ancestors (天, 地 and 祖宗).
