= Japanese punctuation =

Japanese punctuation (Japanese: 約物, Hepburn: yakumono) includes various written marks (besides characters and numbers), which differ from those found in European languages, as well as some not used in formal Japanese writing but frequently found in more casual writing, such as exclamation and question marks.

Japanese can be written horizontally or vertically, and some punctuation marks adapt to this change in direction. Parentheses, curved brackets, square quotation marks, ellipses, dashes, and swung dashes are rotated clockwise 90° when used in vertical text (see diagram).

Japanese punctuation marks are usually "full width" (that is, occupying an area that is the same as the surrounding characters).

Punctuation was not widely used in Japanese writing until translations from European languages became common in the 19th century.

== Japanese punctuation marks ==
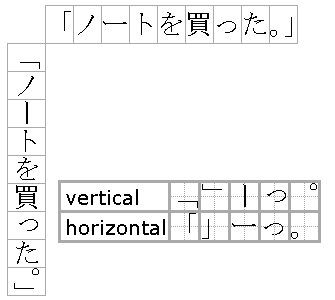
Diagram showing differences in placement of punctuation marks in vertical and horizontal writing, in a sentence containing hiragana, katakana and kanji.

=== Brackets ===
Various types of brackets (括弧, kakko) are used in Japanese. As in English, brackets are used in pairs to set apart or interject text within other text. When writing vertically, brackets are rotated clockwise ninety degrees. Each bracket occupies its own square when using genkō yōshi.

==== Parentheses ====
（ ）

Marukakko (丸括弧, round brackets)

==== Braces ====
｛ ｝

Namikakko (波括弧, wave brackets)

==== Square brackets ====
［ ］

Kakukakko [角括弧, cornered brackets]

==== Lenticular brackets ====
【 】

Sumitsukikakko (隅付き括弧, filled brackets), also known as lenticular brackets. Lenticular brackets are also used as quotation marks in the Japanese language.

=== Comma ===
Symbol	Unicode	JIS X 0213	Encoding
、	U+3001	1-1-2	&#12289;

The comma (読点, tōten) is used in many contexts, principally for marking off separate elements within a sentence. In horizontal writing, the comma is placed at the bottom right of the preceding character. In vertical writing, it is placed immediately below and to the right of the last character, in a separate square if using genkō yōshi. In horizontally written manuscripts that contain a mixture of Japanese and Western characters, the full-width comma may be incorporated as well. No extra space is left after a comma.

Symbol	Unicode	JIS X 0213	Encoding
，	U+FF0C	1-1-4	&#65292;

=== Double hyphen ===
Symbol	Unicode name	Unicode	JIS X 0213	Encoding
゠	KATAKANA-HIRAGANA DOUBLE HYPHEN	U+30A0	1-3-91	&#12448;
＝	FULLWIDTH EQUALS SIGN	U+FF1D	1-1-65	&#65309;

The double hyphen (二重ハイフン, nijū haifun or ダブルハイフン, daburu haifun) is exclusively used in transliteration. It may act in two ways:

- Primarily, it is used to represent a hyphen (-), due to potential confusion with the prolonged sound mark (ー). For example, "Jean-Jacques Rousseau" is written "ジャン゠ジャック・ルソー", and "Catherine Zeta-Jones" is written "キャサリン・ゼタ゠ジョーンズ". Occasionally, the hyphen too may be represented as an interpunct (・), in which case no distinction is made between hyphens and spaces.
- Although far more rarely, it can be observed in identical use to the interpunct. In that case, "Sir Arthur Conan Doyle" may, for example, be written "サー゠アーサー゠コナン゠ドイル".

Digitally, it is correctly represented in Unicode as U+30A0 ゠ KATAKANA-HIRAGANA DOUBLE HYPHEN. However, due to visual similarity, absence from historically common encodings such as Shift JIS and EUC-JP, and ease of input on a keyboard, it is often encountered written as U+FF1D ＝ FULLWIDTH EQUALS SIGN.

=== Ellipsis ===
Symbol	Unicode	JIS X 0213	Encoding
…	U+2026	1-3-63	&#8230;
‥	U+2025	1-3-63	&#8229;

Ellipses (リーダー rīdā (leaders), 点線 tensen (dotted line), or てんてん ten-ten ("dot dot")) indicate an intentional omission or abbreviation, or a pause in speech, an unfinished thought or, at the end of a sentence, a trailing off into silence (aposiopesis). The ellipsis was adopted into Japanese from European languages.

The ellipsis is usually six dots spanning two characters of width; though variation in the number of dots or the width may be used as a stylistic choice or to signify different-length pauses. The dots should be centred in Japanese text; but some fonts may show them on the baseline as the same Unicode character is used for European languages as well.

Other uses:

- As a substitute for dashes
- In manga and visual novels, the ellipsis by itself often represents speechlessness or a "pregnant pause"

=== Full stop ===
Symbol	Unicode	JIS X 0213	Encoding
。	U+3002	1-1-3	&#12290;

The full stop (句点, kuten) is a small circle. In horizontal writing, the full stop is placed in the same position as it would be in English, that is, at the bottom right of the preceding character. In vertical writing, it is placed immediately below and to the right of the last character, in a separate square if using genkō yōshi. (Note the difference in placement with the traditional Chinese full stop, which is placed in the centre of the square.)

Unlike the English full stop, it is often used to separate consecutive sentences, rather than to finish every sentence; it is frequently left out where a sentence stands alone. No extra space is used after a full stop.

In manuscripts that contain a mixture of Japanese and Western characters, the Western full stop may be incorporated as well.

==== Words containing full stops ====
Starting in the 1980s, advertising copy writers began incorporating full stops in titles and other advertising. In the 1990s, the group Morning Musume (モーニング娘。) began using a full stop in its name, starting a fad for this usage. Other examples include the following:

- 25-ji, Nightcord de. (25時、ナイトコードで。), a fictional underground music circle in the video game Hatsune Miku: Colorful Stage! (2020).
- Ecomoni. (エコモ二。), a Japanese pop group from Hello! Project active from 2004 to 2007.
- Good Person. (いいひと。, Ii Hito; 1993–1999), a manga by Shin Takahashi.
- Nobuta. wo Produce (野ブタ。をプロデュース), a drama series (dorama) produced and aired in 2005 by NTV.
- Your Name. (君の名は。), a 2016 Japanese animated romantic drama film written and directed by Makoto Shinkai.
- Zutto Mayonaka de Ii no ni. (ずっと真夜中でいいのに。), a Japanese rock group active since 2018.

=== Interpunct ===
The interpunct ・ (中黒, nakaguro; "middle black") or "katakana middle dot" (as the Unicode consortium calls it) is a small dot used for interword separation. It is also known as nakapochi, nakapotsu and nakaten. It has a fixed width that is the same as most kana characters.

Uses include:

- Separating Japanese words where the intended meaning would be unclear if the characters were written side-by-side
- To separate listed items, instead of a comma: 小・中学校 (elementary and middle school) versus 小、中学校
- To separate foreign words and names when written in kana: パーソナル・コンピューター (personal computer), and occasionally for Japanese names, particularly when there would otherwise be confusion as to where one name ends and another begins.
- As a substitute for a double hyphen
- To separate titles, names and positions: 部長補佐・鈴木 (Assistant Department Head Suzuki)
- As a decimal point when writing numbers in kanji: 三・一四 (3.14)
- In place of hyphens, dashes and colons when writing vertically

=== Part alternation mark ===
The part alternation mark

Symbol	Unicode	JIS X 0213	Encoding
〽	U+303D	1-3-28	&#12349;

The part alternation mark 〽 (庵点 ioriten or 歌記号 utakigō) is used to indicate the beginning of a song, or the beginning of the next player's part.

It was most common in Noh chanting books and Renga (linked verse). In Noh books it is used to mark the beginning of each character's (or the chorus') parts. The opening square quotation mark (「) may also be used.

=== Quotation marks ===
==== Single quotation marks ====
「 」

kagikakko (鉤括弧, hook brackets)

==== Double quotation marks ====
『 』
〝 〟

Double quotation marks (二重鉤括弧, nijūkagikakko) are used to mark quotes within quotes: 「...『...』...」 as well as to mark book titles (Japanese does not have italic type, and does not use sloping type for this purpose in Japanese). They are also sometimes used in fiction to denote text that is heard through a telephone or other device.

=== Space ===
Symbol	Unicode	JIS X 0213	Encoding
⟨ ⟩	U+3000	1-1-1	&#12288;

Use of spaces on genkō yōshi: 1. 3 spaces before the title.; 2. 1 space between the author's family name and given name; 1 space below.; 3. Each new paragraph begins after a space.; 4. Subheadings have 1 empty line before and after, and have 2 spaces above.; 5. Punctuation marks normally occupy their own square, except when they occur at the bottom of a line, in which case they share a square with the last character of the line.

A space is any empty (non-written) zone between written sections. In Japanese, the space is referred to by the transliterated English name (スペース, supēsu). A Japanese space is the same width as a CJK character and is thus also called an "ideographic space".

In English, spaces are used for interword separation as well as separation between punctuation and words. In normal Japanese writing, no spaces are left between words, except if the writing is exclusively in hiragana or katakana (or with very little kanji), in which case spaces may be required to avoid confusion.

In Japanese, a single space is often left before the first character in a new paragraph, especially when writing on genkō yōshi (manuscript paper), and a space is left after non-Japanese punctuation marks (such as exclamation points and question marks). A space may be left between the family and given names as well. When the character is not easily available, a direct HTML equivalent is the &emsp; entity (em-space) which outputs the same fullwidth " " glyph.

A fullwidth space may be used where a colon or comma would be used in English: 大和銀行 大阪支店 (Yamato Bank, Osaka Branch).

=== Wave dash ===
The wave dash

Symbol	Unicode	JIS X 0213	Encoding
〜	U+301C	1-1-33	&#12316;

The wave dash 〜 (波ダッシュ, nami dasshu; wave dash) resembles a lengthened tilde (FULLWIDTH TILDE), which does not exist in JIS X 0208.

Uses in Japanese include:

- To indicate ranges (5時〜6時, from 5 o'clock to 6 o'clock; 東京〜大阪 Tokyo to Osaka). In such cases it may be read as ...kara...made (...から...まで)
- To separate a title from a subtitle on the same line; in English a colon is used for this purpose.
- To mark subtitles: 〜概要〜
- In pairs, in place of dashes or brackets: 〜〜答え〜〜
- To indicate origin: フランス〜 (from France)
- To indicate a long or drawn-out vowel (ですよね〜 or あ〜〜〜), usually for comic or cute effect
- To indicate or suggest that music is playing: ♬ 〜
- To suggest a ruled line: 〜〜〜〜〜 or 〜・〜・〜

== Other punctuation marks in common use ==
The Japanese versions of these punctuation marks are usually full-width characters. A full-width space is usually left after such marks when writing in Japanese.

=== Colon ===
：

The colon (コロン, koron) consists of two equally sized dots centered on the same vertical line. As a rule, a colon informs the reader that what follows proves, clarifies, explains, or simply enumerates elements of what is referred to before. Although not a native Japanese punctuation mark, the colon is sometimes used, especially in academic writing.

As in English, the colon is commonly used in Japanese to indicate time (4:05, instead of 4時5分 or 4分5秒) or for lists (日時:3月3日 4時5分 Day/time: March 3, 4:05pm).

=== Exclamation mark ===
！

The exclamation point or mark (感嘆符, kantanfu), also colloquially called the びっくりマーク (bikkuri māku, lit. "surprise mark") is usually used after an interjection or exclamation to indicate strong feelings or high volume, and generally marks the end of a sentence. A sentence ending in an exclamation mark is either an actual exclamation ("Wow!", "Boo!"), a command ("Stop!"), or is intended to be astonishing in some way ("They were the footprints of a gigantic hound!").

While there is no exclamation point in formal Japanese, it is very commonly used, especially in casual writing, fiction and manga.

=== Question mark ===
？

In formal Japanese, no particular symbol is used to mark interrogative sentences, which end with the normal Japanese full stop (。). However, the question mark is very commonly used, especially in casual and creative writing and in manga. It is generally known formally as 疑問符 (gimonfu) or less formally はてなマーク (hatena māku), but the katakana form of "question mark" (クエスチョンマーク or クエッションマーク) is also common.

=== Musical note ===
♪

This sign is added to the tail of a phrase, indicating it is a part of lyrics or someone is singing the phrase. It may also indicate that the speaker is talking in a sing-song voice.

- example:うさぎおひし♪ かのやま♪

== See also ==
- Iteration mark
- Japanese typographic symbols
- East Asian punctuation, notably:
  - Chinese punctuation, which uses a similar set of symbols but with some differences.
