= List of emojis =

Unicode 18.0 specifies a total of 3,972 emoji using 1,447 characters spread across 24 blocks, of which 26 are Regional indicator symbols that combine in pairs to form flag emoji, and twelve (⟨#⟩, ⟨*⟩ and ⟨0⟩–⟨9⟩) are base characters for keycap emoji sequences.

45 code points in the Dingbats block are considered emoji. All of the code points in the Emoticons block are considered emoji. 92 code points in the Miscellaneous Symbols block are considered emoji. 652 code points in the Miscellaneous Symbols and Pictographs block are considered emoji. 242 code points in the Supplemental Symbols and Pictographs block are considered emoji. All of the code points in the Symbols and Pictographs Extended-A block are considered emoji. 107 code points in the Transport and Map Symbols block are considered emoji.

== Unicode single emoji ==
List of Unicode single emoji^{[1]}^{[2]}^{[3]}^{[4]}
	0	1	2	3	4	5	6	7	8	9	A	B	C	D	E	F
U+00Ax										©️					®️	
U+203x													‼️			
U+204x										⁉️						
U+212x			™️													
U+213x										ℹ️						
U+219x					↔️	↕️	↖️	↗️	↘️	↙️						
U+21Ax										↩️	↪️					
U+231x											⌚️	⌛️				
U+232x									⌨️							
U+23Cx																⏏️
U+23Ex										⏩️	⏪️	⏫️	⏬️	⏭️	⏮️	⏯️
U+23Fx	⏰️	⏱️	⏲️	⏳️					⏸️	⏹️	⏺️					
U+24Cx			Ⓜ️													
U+25Ax											▪️	▫️				
U+25Bx							▶️									
U+25Cx	◀️															
U+25Fx												◻️	◼️	◽️	◾️	
U+260x	☀️	☁️	☂️	☃️	☄️										☎️	
U+261x		☑️			☔️	☕️			☘️					☝️		
U+262x	☠️		☢️	☣️			☦️				☪️				☮️	☯️
U+263x									☸️	☹️	☺️					
U+264x	♀️		♂️						♈️	♉️	♊️	♋️	♌️	♍️	♎️	♏️
U+265x	♐️	♑️	♒️	♓️												♟️
U+266x	♠️			♣️		♥️	♦️		♨️							
U+267x												♻️			♾️	♿️
U+269x			⚒️	⚓️	⚔️	⚕️	⚖️	⚗️		⚙️		⚛️	⚜️			
U+26Ax	⚠️	⚡️						⚧️			⚪️	⚫️				
U+26Bx	⚰️	⚱️												⚽️	⚾️	
U+26Cx					⛄️	⛅️			⛈️						⛎️	⛏️
U+26Dx		⛑️		⛓️	⛔️											
	0	1	2	3	4	5	6	7	8	9	A	B	C	D	E	F
U+26Ex										⛩️	⛪️					
U+26Fx	⛰️	⛱️	⛲️	⛳️	⛴️	⛵️		⛷️	⛸️	⛹️	⛺️			⛽️		
U+270x			✂️			✅️			✈️	✉️	✊️	✋️	✌️	✍️		✏️
U+271x			✒️		✔️		✖️							✝️		
U+272x		✡️							✨️							
U+273x				✳️	✴️											
U+274x					❄️			❇️					❌️		❎️	
U+275x				❓️	❔️	❕️		❗️								
U+276x				❣️	❤️											
U+279x						➕️	➖️	➗️								
U+27Ax		➡️														
U+27Bx	➰️															➿️
U+293x					⤴️	⤵️										
U+2B0x						⬅️	⬆️	⬇️								
U+2B1x												⬛️	⬜️			
U+2B5x	⭐️					⭕️										
U+303x	〰️													〽️		
U+329x								㊗️		㊙️						
U+1F00x					🀄											
U+1F0Cx																🃏
U+1F17x	🅰️	🅱️													🅾️	🅿️
U+1F18x															🆎	
U+1F19x		🆑	🆒	🆓	🆔	🆕	🆖	🆗	🆘	🆙	🆚					
U+1F20x		🈁	🈂️													
U+1F21x											🈚					
U+1F22x																🈯
U+1F23x			🈲	🈳	🈴	🈵	🈶	🈷️	🈸	🈹	🈺					
U+1F25x	🉐	🉑														
U+1F30x	🌀	🌁	🌂	🌃	🌄	🌅	🌆	🌇	🌈	🌉	🌊	🌋	🌌	🌍	🌎	🌏
U+1F31x	🌐	🌑	🌒	🌓	🌔	🌕	🌖	🌗	🌘	🌙	🌚	🌛	🌜	🌝	🌞	🌟
	0	1	2	3	4	5	6	7	8	9	A	B	C	D	E	F
U+1F32x	🌠	🌡️			🌤️	🌥️	🌦️	🌧️	🌨️	🌩️	🌪️	🌫️	🌬️	🌭	🌮	🌯
U+1F33x	🌰	🌱	🌲	🌳	🌴	🌵	🌶️	🌷	🌸	🌹	🌺	🌻	🌼	🌽	🌾	🌿
U+1F34x	🍀	🍁	🍂	🍃	🍄	🍅	🍆	🍇	🍈	🍉	🍊	🍋	🍌	🍍	🍎	🍏
U+1F35x	🍐	🍑	🍒	🍓	🍔	🍕	🍖	🍗	🍘	🍙	🍚	🍛	🍜	🍝	🍞	🍟
U+1F36x	🍠	🍡	🍢	🍣	🍤	🍥	🍦	🍧	🍨	🍩	🍪	🍫	🍬	🍭	🍮	🍯
U+1F37x	🍰	🍱	🍲	🍳	🍴	🍵	🍶	🍷	🍸	🍹	🍺	🍻	🍼	🍽️	🍾	🍿
U+1F38x	🎀	🎁	🎂	🎃	🎄	🎅	🎆	🎇	🎈	🎉	🎊	🎋	🎌	🎍	🎎	🎏
U+1F39x	🎐	🎑	🎒	🎓			🎖️	🎗️		🎙️	🎚️	🎛️			🎞️	🎟️
U+1F3Ax	🎠	🎡	🎢	🎣	🎤	🎥	🎦	🎧	🎨	🎩	🎪	🎫	🎬	🎭	🎮	🎯
U+1F3Bx	🎰	🎱	🎲	🎳	🎴	🎵	🎶	🎷	🎸	🎹	🎺	🎻	🎼	🎽	🎾	🎿
U+1F3Cx	🏀	🏁	🏂	🏃	🏄	🏅	🏆	🏇	🏈	🏉	🏊	🏋️	🏌️	🏍️	🏎️	🏏
U+1F3Dx	🏐	🏑	🏒	🏓	🏔️	🏕️	🏖️	🏗️	🏘️	🏙️	🏚️	🏛️	🏜️	🏝️	🏞️	🏟️
U+1F3Ex	🏠	🏡	🏢	🏣	🏤	🏥	🏦	🏧	🏨	🏩	🏪	🏫	🏬	🏭	🏮	🏯
U+1F3Fx	🏰			🏳️	🏴	🏵️		🏷️	🏸	🏹	🏺	🏻	🏼	🏽	🏾	🏿
U+1F40x	🐀	🐁	🐂	🐃	🐄	🐅	🐆	🐇	🐈	🐉	🐊	🐋	🐌	🐍	🐎	🐏
U+1F41x	🐐	🐑	🐒	🐓	🐔	🐕	🐖	🐗	🐘	🐙	🐚	🐛	🐜	🐝	🐞	🐟
U+1F42x	🐠	🐡	🐢	🐣	🐤	🐥	🐦	🐧	🐨	🐩	🐪	🐫	🐬	🐭	🐮	🐯
U+1F43x	🐰	🐱	🐲	🐳	🐴	🐵	🐶	🐷	🐸	🐹	🐺	🐻	🐼	🐽	🐾	🐿️
U+1F44x	👀	👁️	👂	👃	👄	👅	👆	👇	👈	👉	👊	👋	👌	👍	👎	👏
U+1F45x	👐	👑	👒	👓	👔	👕	👖	👗	👘	👙	👚	👛	👜	👝	👞	👟
U+1F46x	👠	👡	👢	👣	👤	👥	👦	👧	👨	👩	👪	👫	👬	👭	👮	👯
U+1F47x	👰	👱	👲	👳	👴	👵	👶	👷	👸	👹	👺	👻	👼	👽	👾	👿
U+1F48x	💀	💁	💂	💃	💄	💅	💆	💇	💈	💉	💊	💋	💌	💍	💎	💏
U+1F49x	💐	💑	💒	💓	💔	💕	💖	💗	💘	💙	💚	💛	💜	💝	💞	💟
U+1F4Ax	💠	💡	💢	💣	💤	💥	💦	💧	💨	💩	💪	💫	💬	💭	💮	💯
U+1F4Bx	💰	💱	💲	💳	💴	💵	💶	💷	💸	💹	💺	💻	💼	💽	💾	💿
U+1F4Cx	📀	📁	📂	📃	📄	📅	📆	📇	📈	📉	📊	📋	📌	📍	📎	📏
U+1F4Dx	📐	📑	📒	📓	📔	📕	📖	📗	📘	📙	📚	📛	📜	📝	📞	📟
U+1F4Ex	📠	📡	📢	📣	📤	📥	📦	📧	📨	📩	📪	📫	📬	📭	📮	📯
U+1F4Fx	📰	📱	📲	📳	📴	📵	📶	📷	📸	📹	📺	📻	📼	📽️		📿
	0	1	2	3	4	5	6	7	8	9	A	B	C	D	E	F
U+1F50x	🔀	🔁	🔂	🔃	🔄	🔅	🔆	🔇	🔈	🔉	🔊	🔋	🔌	🔍	🔎	🔏
U+1F51x	🔐	🔑	🔒	🔓	🔔	🔕	🔖	🔗	🔘	🔙	🔚	🔛	🔜	🔝	🔞	🔟
U+1F52x	🔠	🔡	🔢	🔣	🔤	🔥	🔦	🔧	🔨	🔩	🔪	🔫	🔬	🔭	🔮	🔯
U+1F53x	🔰	🔱	🔲	🔳	🔴	🔵	🔶	🔷	🔸	🔹	🔺	🔻	🔼	🔽		
U+1F54x										🕉️	🕊️	🕋	🕌	🕍	🕎	
U+1F55x	🕐	🕑	🕒	🕓	🕔	🕕	🕖	🕗	🕘	🕙	🕚	🕛	🕜	🕝	🕞	🕟
U+1F56x	🕠	🕡	🕢	🕣	🕤	🕥	🕦	🕧								🕯️
U+1F57x	🕰️			🕳️	🕴️	🕵️	🕶️	🕷️	🕸️	🕹️	🕺					
U+1F58x								🖇️			🖊️	🖋️	🖌️	🖍️		
U+1F59x	🖐️					🖕	🖖									
U+1F5Ax					🖤	🖥️			🖨️							
U+1F5Bx		🖱️	🖲️										🖼️			
U+1F5Cx			🗂️	🗃️	🗄️											
U+1F5Dx		🗑️	🗒️	🗓️									🗜️	🗝️	🗞️	
U+1F5Ex		🗡️		🗣️					🗨️							🗯️
U+1F5Fx				🗳️							🗺️	🗻	🗼	🗽	🗾	🗿
U+1F60x	😀	😁	😂	😃	😄	😅	😆	😇	😈	😉	😊	😋	😌	😍	😎	😏
U+1F61x	😐	😑	😒	😓	😔	😕	😖	😗	😘	😙	😚	😛	😜	😝	😞	😟
U+1F62x	😠	😡	😢	😣	😤	😥	😦	😧	😨	😩	😪	😫	😬	😭	😮	😯
U+1F63x	😰	😱	😲	😳	😴	😵	😶	😷	😸	😹	😺	😻	😼	😽	😾	😿
U+1F64x	🙀	🙁	🙂	🙃	🙄	🙅	🙆	🙇	🙈	🙉	🙊	🙋	🙌	🙍	🙎	🙏
U+1F68x	🚀	🚁	🚂	🚃	🚄	🚅	🚆	🚇	🚈	🚉	🚊	🚋	🚌	🚍	🚎	🚏
U+1F69x	🚐	🚑	🚒	🚓	🚔	🚕	🚖	🚗	🚘	🚙	🚚	🚛	🚜	🚝	🚞	🚟
U+1F6Ax	🚠	🚡	🚢	🚣	🚤	🚥	🚦	🚧	🚨	🚩	🚪	🚫	🚬	🚭	🚮	🚯
U+1F6Bx	🚰	🚱	🚲	🚳	🚴	🚵	🚶	🚷	🚸	🚹	🚺	🚻	🚼	🚽	🚾	🚿
U+1F6Cx	🛀	🛁	🛂	🛃	🛄	🛅						🛋️	🛌	🛍️	🛎️	🛏️
U+1F6Dx	🛐	🛑	🛒			🛕	🛖	🛗	🛘	🛙			🛜	🛝	🛞	🛟
U+1F6Ex	🛠️	🛡️	🛢️	🛣️	🛤️	🛥️				🛩️		🛫	🛬			
U+1F6Fx	🛰️			🛳️	🛴	🛵	🛶	🛷	🛸	🛹	🛺	🛻	🛼			
U+1F7Ex	🟠	🟡	🟢	🟣	🟤	🟥	🟦	🟧	🟨	🟩	🟪	🟫				
	0	1	2	3	4	5	6	7	8	9	A	B	C	D	E	F
U+1F7Fx	🟰															
U+1F90x													🤌	🤍	🤎	🤏
U+1F91x	🤐	🤑	🤒	🤓	🤔	🤕	🤖	🤗	🤘	🤙	🤚	🤛	🤜	🤝	🤞	🤟
U+1F92x	🤠	🤡	🤢	🤣	🤤	🤥	🤦	🤧	🤨	🤩	🤪	🤫	🤬	🤭	🤮	🤯
U+1F93x	🤰	🤱	🤲	🤳	🤴	🤵	🤶	🤷	🤸	🤹	🤺		🤼	🤽	🤾	🤿
U+1F94x	🥀	🥁	🥂	🥃	🥄	🥅		🥇	🥈	🥉	🥊	🥋	🥌	🥍	🥎	🥏
U+1F95x	🥐	🥑	🥒	🥓	🥔	🥕	🥖	🥗	🥘	🥙	🥚	🥛	🥜	🥝	🥞	🥟
U+1F96x	🥠	🥡	🥢	🥣	🥤	🥥	🥦	🥧	🥨	🥩	🥪	🥫	🥬	🥭	🥮	🥯
U+1F97x	🥰	🥱	🥲	🥳	🥴	🥵	🥶	🥷	🥸	🥹	🥺	🥻	🥼	🥽	🥾	🥿
U+1F98x	🦀	🦁	🦂	🦃	🦄	🦅	🦆	🦇	🦈	🦉	🦊	🦋	🦌	🦍	🦎	🦏
U+1F99x	🦐	🦑	🦒	🦓	🦔	🦕	🦖	🦗	🦘	🦙	🦚	🦛	🦜	🦝	🦞	🦟
U+1F9Ax	🦠	🦡	🦢	🦣	🦤	🦥	🦦	🦧	🦨	🦩	🦪	🦫	🦬	🦭	🦮	🦯
U+1F9Bx	🦰	🦱	🦲	🦳	🦴	🦵	🦶	🦷	🦸	🦹	🦺	🦻	🦼	🦽	🦾	🦿
U+1F9Cx	🧀	🧁	🧂	🧃	🧄	🧅	🧆	🧇	🧈	🧉	🧊	🧋	🧌	🧍	🧎	🧏
U+1F9Dx	🧐	🧑	🧒	🧓	🧔	🧕	🧖	🧗	🧘	🧙	🧚	🧛	🧜	🧝	🧞	🧟
U+1F9Ex	🧠	🧡	🧢	🧣	🧤	🧥	🧦	🧧	🧨	🧩	🧪	🧫	🧬	🧭	🧮	🧯
U+1F9Fx	🧰	🧱	🧲	🧳	🧴	🧵	🧶	🧷	🧸	🧹	🧺	🧻	🧼	🧽	🧾	🧿
U+1FA7x	🩰	🩱	🩲	🩳	🩴	🩵	🩶	🩷	🩸	🩹	🩺	🩻	🩼			
U+1FA8x	🪀	🪁	🪂	🪃	🪄	🪅	🪆	🪇	🪈	🪉	🪊	🪋	🪌	🪍	🪎	🪏
U+1FA9x	🪐	🪑	🪒	🪓	🪔	🪕	🪖	🪗	🪘	🪙	🪚	🪛	🪜	🪝	🪞	🪟
U+1FAAx	🪠	🪡	🪢	🪣	🪤	🪥	🪦	🪧	🪨	🪩	🪪	🪫	🪬	🪭	🪮	🪯
U+1FABx	🪰	🪱	🪲	🪳	🪴	🪵	🪶	🪷	🪸	🪹	🪺	🪻	🪼	🪽	🪾	🪿
U+1FACx	🫀	🫁	🫂	🫃	🫄	🫅	🫆		🫈				🫌	🫍	🫎	🫏
U+1FADx	🫐	🫑	🫒	🫓	🫔	🫕	🫖	🫗	🫘	🫙	🫚	🫛	🫜	🫝		🫟
U+1FAEx	🫠	🫡	🫢	🫣	🫤	🫥	🫦	🫧	🫨	🫩	🫪	🫫				🫯
U+1FAFx	🫰	🫱	🫲	🫳	🫴	🫵	🫶	🫷	🫸	🫹	🫺					
	0	1	2	3	4	5	6	7	8	9	A	B	C	D	E	F
Notes 1.As of Unicode version 18.0 2.Grey areas indicate non-emoji or non-assigned code points 3."UTR #51: Unicode Emoji". Unicode Consortium. 4."UCD: Emoji Data for UTR #51". Unicode Consortium. 2026-01-30.

Additional emoji can be found in the following Unicode blocks: Arrows (8 code points considered emoji), Basic Latin (12), CJK Symbols and Punctuation (2), Enclosed Alphanumeric Supplement (41), Enclosed Alphanumerics (1), Enclosed CJK Letters and Months (2), Enclosed Ideographic Supplement (15), General Punctuation (2), Geometric Shapes (8), Geometric Shapes Extended (13), Latin-1 Supplement (2), Letterlike Symbols (2), Mahjong Tiles (1), Miscellaneous Symbols and Arrows (7), Miscellaneous Technical (18), Playing Cards (1), and Supplemental Arrows-B (2).

== Notable emoji with description and associated meaning ==
=== Faces ===
Notable emoji with faces include:

Emoji	Unicode name	Codepoints	Added in	Unicode block	Meaning
😀	Grinning Face	U+1F600	Emoji 1.0 in 2015	Emoticons	see Grinning Face emoji
😂	Face with Tears of Joy	U+1F602	Emoji 1.0 in 2015	Emoticons	see Face with Tears of Joy emoji
😍	Smiling Face with Heart-Shaped Eyes	U+1F60D	Emoji 1.0 in 2015	Emoticons	see Face with Heart Eyes emoji
😏	Smirking Face	U+1F60F	Emoji 1.0 in 2015	Emoticons	see Smirking Face emoji
🤗	Smiling Face with Open Hands	U+1F917	Emoji 1.0 in 2015	Emoticons	see Hugging Face emoji
🤔	Thinking Face	U+1F917	Emoji 1.0 in 2015	Emoticons	see Thinking Face emoji
🫥	Dotted Line Face	U+1FAE5	Emoji 14.0 in 2021	Emoticons	see Dotted Line Face emoji
🫨	Shaking Face	U+1FAE8	Emoji 15.0 in 2022	Emoticons	see Shaking Face emoji
💋	Kiss Mark	U+1F48B	Emoji 1.0 in 2015	Emoticons	see Kiss Mark emoji
🧕	Person with Headscarf	U+1F9D5	Emoji 5.0 in 2017	Emoticons	Typically used to represent a woman wearing a hijab
🕴️	Man in Business Suit Levitating	U+1F574	Unicode 7.0 in 2014	Miscellaneous Symbols and Pictographs	see Man in Business Suit Levitating emoji
🧑‍🧑‍🧒	Family: Adult, Adult, Child	No	Emoji 15.1 in 2023	Emotions	see Gender-Neutral Family emoji
🧑‍🧑‍🧒‍🧒	Family: Adult, Adult, Child, Child	No	Emoji 15.1 in 2023	Emotions	see Gender-Neutral Family emoji
🧑‍🧒	Family: Adult, Child	No	Emoji 15.1 in 2023	Emotions	see Gender-Neutral Family emoji
🧑‍🧒‍🧒	Family: Adult, Child, Child	No	Emoji 15.1 in 2023	Emotions	see Gender-Neutral Family emoji

=== Nature ===
Notable nature-based emojis include:

Emoji	Unicode name	Codepoints	Added in	Unicode block	Meaning
🌞	Sun with Face	U+1F31E	Emoji 1.0 in 2015	Emoticons	see Sun with Face emoji
🌝	Full Moon Face	U+1F31D	Emoji 1.0 in 2015	Emoticons	see Full Moon Face emoji
🌛	First Quarter Moon Face	U+1F31B	Emoji 1.0 in 2015	Emoticons	see First Quarter Moon Face emoji
🌜	Last Quarter Moon Face	U+1F31C	Emoji 1.0 in 2015	Emoticons	see Last Quarter Moon Face emoji
🌚	New Moon Face	U+1F31C	Emoji 1.0 in 2015	Emoticons	see New Moon Face emoji
🌕	Full Moon	U+1F31C	Emoji 1.0 in 2015	Emoticons	see Full Moon symbol
🌖	Waning Gibbous Moon	U+1F316	Emoji 1.0 in 2015	Emoticons	see Waning Gibbous Moon symbol
🌗	Last Quarter Moon	U+1F317	Emoji 1.0 in 2015	Emoticons	see Last Quarter Moon symbol
🌘	Waning Crescent Moon	U+1F318	Emoji 1.0 in 2015	Emoticons	see Waning Crescent Moon symbol
🌑	New Moon	U+1F311	Emoji 1.0 in 2015	Emoticons	see New Moon symbol
🌒	Waxing Crescent Moon	U+1F312	Emoji 1.0 in 2015	Emoticons	see Waxing Crescent Moon symbol
🌓	First Quarter Moon	U+1F313	Emoji 1.0 in 2015	Emoticons	see First Quarter Moon symbol
🌔	Waxing Crescent Moon	U+1F314	Emoji 1.0 in 2015	Emoticons	see Waxing Crescent Moon symbol
🌙	Crescent Moon	U+1F319	Emoji 1.0 in 2015	Emoticons	see Crescent Moon emoji
🪐	Ringed Planet	U+1FA90	Emoji 12.0 in 2019	Emoticons	see Ringed Planet emoji
☄️	Comet	U+00E6	Emoji 1.0 in 2015	Emoticons	see Comet emoji
🔥	Fire	U+1F525	Emoji 1.0 in 2015	Emoticons	see Fire emoji
🌈	Rainbow	U+1F308	Emoji 1.0 in 2015	Emoticons	see Rainbow emoji
🌠	Shooting Star	U+1F320	Emoji 1.0 in 2015	Emotions	see Shooting Star emoji

=== Food ===
Notable food-based emojis include:

Emoji	Unicode name	Codepoints	Added in	Unicode block	Meaning
🍆	Aubergine	U+1F346	Emoji 1.0 in 2015	Emoticons	see Eggplant emoji
🍑	Peach	U+1F351	Emoji 1.0 in 2015	Emoticons	see Peach emoji
🍍	Pineapple	U+1F34D	Emoji 1.0 in 2015	Emoticons	see Pineapple emoji
🍜	Steaming Bowl	U+1F35C	Emoji 1.0 in 2015	Emoticons	see Steaming Bowl emoji

=== Activity ===
Notable activity-based emojis include:

Emoji	Unicode name	Codepoints	Added in	Unicode block	Meaning
🪩	Mirror Ball	U+1FAA9	Emoji 14.0 in 2021	Emoticons	see Mirror Ball emoji

=== Places ===
Notable places-based emojis include:

Emoji	Unicode name	Codepoints	Added in	Unicode block	Meaning
🌎	Earth Globe Americas	U+1F30E	Emoji 1.0 in 2015	Emoticons	see Earth Globe Americas emoji
🌍	Earth Globe Europe-Africa	U+1F30D	Emoji 1.0 in 2015	Emoticons	see Earth Globe Europe-Africa emoji
🌏	Earth Globe Asia-Australia	U+1F30F	Emoji 1.0 in 2015	Emoticons	see Earth Globe Asia-Australia emoji
🗺️	World Map	U+1F5FA	Emoji 1.0 in 2015	Emoticons	see World Map emoji
🗿	Moai	U+1F5FF	Emoji 1.0 in 2015	Emoticons	see Moai emoji

=== Objects ===
Notable objects-based emojis include:

Emoji	Unicode name	Codepoints	Added in	Unicode block	Meaning
💽	Computer Disk	U+1F4BD	Emoji 1.0 in 2015	Emoticons	see Computer Disk emoji
💿	Optical Disc	U+1F4BF	Emoji 1.0 in 2015	Emoticons	see Optical Disc emoji
📀	DVD	U+1F34D	Emoji 1.0 in 2015	Emoticons	see DVD emoji
🧿	Nazar Amulet	U+1F35C	Emoji 11.0 in 2018	Emoticons	see Nazar Amulet emoji
🪬	Hamsa	U+1FAAC	Emoji 14.0 in 2021	Emoticons	see Hamsa emoji

=== Symbols ===
Notable symbols-based emojis include:

Emoji	Unicode name	Codepoints	Added in	Unicode block	Meaning
💌	Love Letter	U+1F48C	Emoji 1.0 in 2015	Emoticons	see Love Letter emoji
🩷	Pink Heart	U+1FA77	Emoji 15.0 in 2022	Emoticons	see Pink Heart emoji
❤️	Red Heart	U+2764 U+FE0F	Emoji 1.0 in 2015	Emoticons	see Red Heart emoji
🧡	Orange Heart	U+1F9E1	Emoji 5.0 in 2017	Emoticons	see Orange Heart emoji
💛	Yellow Heart	U+1F49B	Emoji 1.0 in 2015	Emoticons	see Yellow Heart emoji
💚	Green Heart	U+1F49Aa	Emoji 1.0 in 2015	Emoticons	see Green Heart emoji
🩵	Light Blue Heart	U+1FA75	Emoji 15.0 in 2022	Emoticons	see Light Blue Heart emoji
💙	Blue Heart	U+1F499	Emoji 1.0 in 2015	Emoticons	see Blue Heart emoji
💜	Purple Heart	U+1FA75	Emoji 15.0 in 2022	Emoticons	see Purple Heart emoji
🖤	Black Heart	U+1F5A4	Emoji 3.0 in 2016	Emoticons	see Black Heart emoji
🩶	Grey Heart	U+1FA76	Emoji 15.0 in 2022	Emoticons	see Grey Heart emoji
🤍	White Heart	U+1F90D	Emoji 12.0 in 2019	Emoticons	see White Heart emoji
🤎	Brown Heart	U+1F90E	Emoji 12.0 in 2019	Emoticons	see Brown Heart emoji
💔	Broken Heart	U+1FA76	Emoji 1.0 in 2015	Emoticons	see Broken Heart emoji
❤️‍🔥	Heart on Fire	U+2764 U+FE0F U+200D U+1F525	Emoji 13.1 in 2020	Emoticons	see Heart on Fire emoji
❤️‍🩹	Mending Heart	U+2764 U+FE0F U+200D U+1FA79	Emoji 13.1 in 2020	Emoticons	see Mending Heart emoji
❣️	Heart Exclamation	U+2763 U+FE0F	Emoji 1.0 in 2015	Emoticons	see Heart Exclamation emoji
💕	Two Hearts	U+1F495	Emoji 1.0 in 2015	Emoticons	see Two Hearts emoji
💞	Revolving Hearts	U+1F49E	Emoji 1.0 in 2015	Emoticons	see Revolving Heart emoji
💓	Beating Heart	U+1F493	Emoji 1.0 in 2015	Emoticons	see Beating Heart emoji
💗	Growing Heart	U+1F497	Emoji 1.0 in 2015	Emoticons	see Growing Heart emoji
💖	Sparkling Heart	U+1F496	Emoji 1.0 in 2015	Emoticons	see Sparkling Heart emoji
💘	Heart with Arrow	U+1F495	Emoji 1.0 in 2015	Emoticons	see Heart with Arrow emoji
💝	Heart with Ribbon	U+1F49D	Emoji 1.0 in 2015	Emoticons	see Heart with Ribbon emoji
💟	Heart Decoration	U+1F49D	Emoji 1.0 in 2015	Emoticons	see Heart Decoration emoji
☮️	Peace Symbol	U+262E	Emoji 1.0 in 2015	Emoticons	see Peace sign
✝️	Latin Cross	U+271D	Emoji 1.0 in 2015	Emoticons	see Latin Cross emoji
☪️	Star and Crescent	U+262A	Emoji 1.0 in 2015	Emoticons	see Star and Cresent emoji
☸️	Wheel of Dharma	U+2638	Emoji 1.0 in 2015	Emoticons	see Wheel of Dharma emoji
✡️	Star of David	U+2721	Emoji 1.0 in 2015	Emoticons	see Star of David emoji
🕎	Menorah	U+1F54E	Emoji 1.0 in 2015	Emoticons	see Menorah emoji
☯️	Yin Yang	U+262F	Emoji 1.0 in 2015	Emoticons	see Yin Yang emoji
⛎	Ophiuchus	U+26CE	Emoji 1.0 in 2015	Emoticons	see Ophiuchus emoji
♈️	Aries	U+2648	Emoji 1.0 in 2015	Emoticons	see Aries emoji
♉️	Taurus	U+2649	Emoji 1.0 in 2015	Emoticons	see Taurus emoji
♊️	Gemini	U+264A	Emoji 1.0 in 2015	Emoticons	see Gemini emoji
♋️	Cancer	U+264B	Emoji 1.0 in 2015	Emoticons	see Cancer emoji
♌️	Leo	U+264C	Emoji 1.0 in 2015	Emoticons	see Leo emoji
♍️	Virgo	U+264D	Emoji 1.0 in 2015	Emoticons	see Virgo emoji
♎️	Libra	U+264E	Emoji 1.0 in 2015	Emoticons	see Libra emoji
♏️	Scorpio	U+264F	Emoji 1.0 in 2015	Emoticons	see Scorpio emoji
♐️	Sagittarius	U+2650	Emoji 1.0 in 2015	Emoticons	see Sagittarius emoji
♑️	Capricorn	U+2651	Emoji 1.0 in 2015	Emoticons	see Capricorn emoji
♒️	Aquarius	U+2652	Emoji 1.0 in 2015	Emoticons	see Aquarius emoji
♓️	Pisces	U+2653	Emoji 1.0 in 2015	Emoticons	see Pisces emoji
🅱️	B Button (Blood Type)	U+1F171	Emoji 1.0 in 2015	Emoticons	see B Button (Blood Type) emoji
🆑	CL Button	U+1F191	Emoji 1.0 in 2015	Emoticons	see CL Button emoji
🆘	SOS Button	U+1F198	Emoji 1.0 in 2015	Emoticons	see SOS Button emoji
🏧	ATM Sign	U+1F3E7	Emoji 1.0 in 2015	Emoticons	see ATM Sign emoji
🚾	Water Closet	U+1F6BE	Emoji 1.0 in 2015	Emoticons	see Water Closet emoji
♿️	Wheelchair Symbol	U+267F	Emoji 1.0 in 2015	Emoticons	see Wheelchair Symbol emoji
🚹	Men's Room	U+1F6B9	Emoji 1.0 in 2015	Emoticons	see Men's Room emoji
🚺	Women's Room	U+1F6BA	Emoji 1.0 in 2015	Emoticons	see Women's Room emoji
🚼	Baby Symbol	U+1F6BC	Emoji 1.0 in 2015	Emoticons	see Baby Symbol emoji
⚧️	Transgender Symbol	U+26A7	Emoji 13.0 in 2020	Emoticons	see Transgender Symbol emoji
🚻	Restroom	U+1F6BB	Emoji 1.0 in 2015	Emoticons	see Restroom emoji
🆒	Cool Button	U+1F192	Emoji 1.0 in 2015	Emoticons	see Cool Button emoji
➕	Plus	U+2795	Emoji 1.0 in 2015	Emoticons	see Plus emoji
➖	Minus	U+2796	Emoji 1.0 in 2015	Emoticons	see Minus emoji
➗	Divide	U+2797	Emoji 1.0 in 2015	Emoticons	see Divide emoji
✖️	Multiply	U+2716	Emoji 1.0 in 2015	Emoticons	see Multiply emoji
♾️	Infinity	U+267E	Emoji 1.0 in 2015	Emoticons	see Infinity emoji
🔛	On! Arrow	U+1F51B	Emoji 1.0 in 2015	Emoticons	see On! Arrow emoji
✔️	Check Mark	U+2714	Emoji 1.0 in 2015	Emoticons	see Check Mark emoji
🟢	Green Circle	U+1F7E2	Emoji 12.0 in 2019	Emoticons	see Green Circle emoji
⚫️	Black Circle	U+26AB	Emoji 1.0 in 2015	Emoticons	see Black Circle emoji
⚪️	White Circle	U+26AA	Emoji 1.0 in 2015	Emoticons	see White Circle emoji
🔻	Red Triangle Pointed Down	U+1F53B	Emoji 1.0 in 2015	Emoticons	see Red Triangle Pointed Down emoji
◻️	White Medium Square	U+25FB	Emoji 1.0 in 2015	Emoticons	see White Medium Square emoji
♠️	Spade Suit	U+2660	Emoji 1.0 in 2015	Emoticons	see Spade Suit emoji
♣️	Club Suit	U+2663	Emoji 1.0 in 2015	Emoticons	see Club Suit emoji
♥️	Heart Suit	U+2665	Emoji 1.0 in 2015	Emoticons	see Heart Suit emoji
♦️	Diamond Suit	U+2666	Emoji 1.0 in 2015	Emoticons	see Diamond Suit emoji

=== Flags ===
Notable flags-based emojis include:

Emoji	Unicode name	Codepoints	Added in	Unicode block	Meaning
🏳️	White Flag	U+1F3F3	Emoji 1.0 in 2015	Emoticons	see White Flag emoji
🏴	Black Flag	U+1F3F4	Emoji 1.0 in 2015	Emoticons	see Black Flag emoji
🏴‍☠️	Pirate Flag	No	Emoji 11.0 in 2018	Emoticons	see Pirate Flag emoji
🏁	Chequered Flag	U+1F3C1	Emoji 1.0 in 2015	Emoticons	see Chequered Flag emoji
🚩	Triangular Flag	U+1F6A9	Emoji 1.0 in 2015	Emoticons	see Triangular Flag emoji
🏳️‍🌈	Rainbow Flag	No	Emoji 1.0 in 2015	Emoticons	see Rainbow Flag emoji
🏳️‍⚧️	Transgender Flag	No	Emoji 13.0 in 2020	Emoticons	see Transgender Flag emoji
🎌	Crossed Flags	U+1F6A9	Emoji 1.0 in 2015	Emoticons	see Crossed Flags emoji

=== Miscellaneous ===
Emoji	Unicode name	Codepoints	Added in	Unicode block	Meaning
✨	Sparkles	U+2728	Emoji 1.0 in 2015	Emoticons	Used to emphasize text or represent artificial intelligence
💩	Pile of Poo	U+1F4A9	Emoji 1.0 in 2015	Emoticons	see Poop emoji
🔫	Pistol	U+1F52B	Emoji 1.0 in 2015	Emoticons	see Pistol emoji
💀	Skull	U+1F480	Emoji 1.0 in 2015	Emoticons	see Skull emoji
🤖	Robot	U+1F916	Unicode 8.0 and Emoji 1.0 in 2015	Emoticons	see Robot emoji
🤡	Clown	U+1F921	Unicode 9.0 and Emoji 3.0 in 2016	Emoticons	see Clown emoji
🙏	Folded Hands	U+1F64F	Emoji 1.0 in 2015	Emotions	see Folded Hands emoji
🫀	Anatomical Heart	U+1FAC0	Emoji 13.0 in 2020	Emotions	see Anatomical Heart emoji
🫁	Lungs	U+1FAC1	Emoji 13.0 in 2020	Emotions	see Lungs emoji
🦠	Microbe	U+1F9A0	Emoji 11.0 in 2018	Emoticons	see Microbe emoji

== Additions ==
Some vendors, most notably Microsoft, Samsung and HTC, add emoji presentation to some other existing Unicode characters or coin their own ZWJ sequences.

Microsoft displayed all Mahjong tiles (U+1F000‥2B, not just U+1F004 🀄 MAHJONG TILE RED DRAGON) until Windows 11 22H2 and alternative card suits (U+2661 ♡ WHITE HEART SUIT, U+2662 ♢ WHITE DIAMOND SUIT, U+2664 ♤ WHITE SPADE SUIT, U+2667 ♧ WHITE CLUB SUIT) as emoji. They also supported additional pencils (U+270E ✎ LOWER RIGHT PENCIL, U+2710 ✐ UPPER RIGHT PENCIL) and a heart-shaped bullet (U+2765 ❥ ROTATED HEAVY BLACK HEART BULLET) until the first Windows 11 update.

While only U+261D ☝ WHITE UP POINTING INDEX is officially an emoji, Microsoft and Samsung add the other three directions as well (U+261C ☜ WHITE LEFT POINTING INDEX, U+261E ☞ WHITE RIGHT POINTING INDEX, U+261F ☟ WHITE DOWN POINTING INDEX). Microsoft no longer supports these emojis now.

Both vendors pair the standard checked ballot box emoji U+2611 ☑ BALLOT BOX WITH CHECK with its crossed variant U+2612 ☒ BALLOT BOX WITH X, but only Samsung also has the empty ballot box U+2610 ☐ BALLOT BOX.

Samsung almost completely covers the rest of the Miscellaneous Symbols block (U+2600‥FF) as emoji, which includes chess pieces, game die faces, some traffic sign as well as genealogical and astronomical symbols for instance.

HTC supports most additional pictographs from the Miscellaneous Symbols and Pictographs (U+1F300‥5FF) and Transport and Map Symbols (U+1F680‥FF) blocks. Some of them are also shown as emoji on Samsung devices.

The open source projects Emojidex and Emojitwo are trying to cover all of these extensions established by major vendors.

== Last update ==
The latest update to the emoji set is version 18.0. It includes nine new symbols: cracking face, a monarch butterfly, a net, a meteor, a lighthouse, a pickle, an eraser, and gestures pointing the thumb to the right and left.

In the initial draft of Emoji 18.0, a face with squinting eyes replaced the face with cracks. Emoji version 18.0 was released on September 16.

== See also ==
- Dingbats (Unicode block)
- Emoticons (Unicode block)
- Miscellaneous Symbols
- Miscellaneous Symbols and Pictographs
- Supplemental Symbols and Pictographs
- Symbols and Pictographs Extended-A
- Transport and Map Symbols
