= Apple Color Emoji =

Emoji typeface used on Apple platforms

- Category: Emoji
- Designer: Various
- Commissioned by: Apple Inc.
- Also known as: Emoji

Apple Color Emoji (stylized as AppleColorEmoji) is a color typeface used on Apple platforms such as iOS and macOS to display emoji characters.

The inclusion of emoji in the iPhone and in the Unicode standard has been credited with promoting the spreading use of emoji outside Japan. As with many Apple icons past and present, they feature a design based on deep, saturated colors and gradual transitions of color, often incorporating subtle gloss effects.

== Original release ==
The first version of Apple Color Emoji was released alongside iPhone OS 2.2 in November 2008 and contained 471 individual emoji glyphs. Originally limited to Japanese iPhone models, this restriction was later lifted.

The designers of the first Apple Color Emoji typeface were Raymond Sepulveda, Angela Guzman and Ollie Wagner.

Due to the iPhone originally launching in Japan on the SoftBank network, some Apple emoji designs may have been created to resemble those on SoftBank phones. For example, 💃 (defined by Unicode as 'dancer' with no specified gender) is feminine on Apple and SoftBank phones but was previously masculine or gender-neutral on others.

== Expansion ==
In the years 2011–2018 the Apple Color Emoji font expanded from 471 to 3,633 emoji as of September 2021.

An updated emoji keyboard was released in iOS version 8.3, this update also added varied skin tones and same-gender couples included in Unicode 6. As a result, the human emoji faces switched to a neutral yellow skin tone by default, similar to the smiley emoji.

The majority of Apple Color Emoji designs were updated with the release of iOS 10.2 in December 2016, with many appearing to be 3D-rendered. According to Apple Vice President of User Interface Design Alan Dye, emoji redesigns were due to the advent of Animoji, Memoji, and higher resolution screens.

157 new emoji were added to iOS in October 2018.

The designers of the Apple Color Emoji typeface in versions after the initial release have not been publicly credited, following Apple's standard practice of not crediting work to individuals. Former Apple employees have offered accounts of who created various designs.

== Implementation ==
Prior to iOS 5 SoftBank encoding was used for encoding emoji on Apple devices. Beginning with iOS 5, emoji are encoded using the Unicode standard. Emoji glyphs are stored as PNG images, at several resolutions (strikes of 20, 32, 40, 48, 64, 96 and 160 pixels squared) using a proprietary "sbix" table that was later standardized in OpenType version 1.8.

The font contains a number of Easter eggs. Several glyphs contain portions of the text of Apple's Think different advertisement ("Here's to the crazy ones..."), including 1F4CB "Clipboard" (📋), 1F4C4 "Page facing up" (📄), 1F4D1 "Bookmark Tabs" (📑), and 1F4D6 "Open book" (📖), among others. Other emoji, specified as generic objects, appear as Apple products. For example, 1F4BB "Laptop" (💻) appears as a modern MacBook, while 1F5A5 "Desktop Computer" (🖥️) appears as a modern iMac and 231A "Wristwatch" (⌚) shows an Apple Watch. 1F301 "Foggy" (🌁) shows the Golden Gate Bridge behind San Francisco fog, a reference to Apple's California headquarters, and 1F4F0 "Newspaper" (📰)'s headline reads "The Apple Times".

A variety of styles are used in the original sets. For example, 🐬 and 🐙 (dolphin and octopus) were quite stylized with 'button' eyes, while 🐈 and 🐀 (cat and rat) were more realistic, resembling watercolor paintings. This mixture of styles creates a range of possible designs: for example, 🐏 and 🐑 (ram and sheep) look clearly different, as do 🐫 and 🐪 (Bactrian camel and dromedary).

== Trends ==
Because of the calendar emoji (📅) showing July 17, this date was chosen for the annual World Emoji Day. The date originally referred to the day Apple premiered its calendar application, iCal, in 2002.

Although primarily intended for onscreen display (iOS having limited printing capabilities), some printed displays and signs have used Apple Color Emoji designs. New York magazine used Apple Color Emoji in a printed feature on the growing use of emoji.

== Emoji 17 ==
List of Unicode single emoji^{[1]}^{[2]}^{[3]}^{[4]}
	0	1	2	3	4	5	6	7	8	9	A	B	C	D	E	F
U+00Ax										©️					®️	
U+203x													‼️			
U+204x										⁉️						
U+212x			™️													
U+213x										ℹ️						
U+219x					↔️	↕️	↖️	↗️	↘️	↙️						
U+21Ax										↩️	↪️					
U+231x											⌚️	⌛️				
U+232x									⌨️							
U+23Cx																⏏️
U+23Ex										⏩️	⏪️	⏫️	⏬️	⏭️	⏮️	⏯️
U+23Fx	⏰️	⏱️	⏲️	⏳️					⏸️	⏹️	⏺️					
U+24Cx			Ⓜ️													
U+25Ax											▪️	▫️				
U+25Bx							▶️									
U+25Cx	◀️															
U+25Fx												◻️	◼️	◽️	◾️	
U+260x	☀️	☁️	☂️	☃️	☄️										☎️	
U+261x		☑️			☔️	☕️			☘️					☝️		
U+262x	☠️		☢️	☣️			☦️				☪️				☮️	☯️
U+263x									☸️	☹️	☺️					
U+264x	♀️		♂️						♈️	♉️	♊️	♋️	♌️	♍️	♎️	♏️
U+265x	♐️	♑️	♒️	♓️												♟️
U+266x	♠️			♣️		♥️	♦️		♨️							
U+267x												♻️			♾️	♿️
U+269x			⚒️	⚓️	⚔️	⚕️	⚖️	⚗️		⚙️		⚛️	⚜️			
U+26Ax	⚠️	⚡️						⚧️			⚪️	⚫️				
U+26Bx	⚰️	⚱️												⚽️	⚾️	
U+26Cx					⛄️	⛅️			⛈️						⛎️	⛏️
U+26Dx		⛑️		⛓️	⛔️											
	0	1	2	3	4	5	6	7	8	9	A	B	C	D	E	F
U+26Ex										⛩️	⛪️					
U+26Fx	⛰️	⛱️	⛲️	⛳️	⛴️	⛵️		⛷️	⛸️	⛹️	⛺️			⛽️		
U+270x			✂️			✅️			✈️	✉️	✊️	✋️	✌️	✍️		✏️
U+271x			✒️		✔️		✖️							✝️		
U+272x		✡️							✨️							
U+273x				✳️	✴️											
U+274x					❄️			❇️					❌️		❎️	
U+275x				❓️	❔️	❕️		❗️								
U+276x				❣️	❤️											
U+279x						➕️	➖️	➗️								
U+27Ax		➡️														
U+27Bx	➰️															➿️
U+293x					⤴️	⤵️										
U+2B0x						⬅️	⬆️	⬇️								
U+2B1x												⬛️	⬜️			
U+2B5x	⭐️					⭕️										
U+303x	〰️													〽️		
U+329x								㊗️		㊙️						
U+1F00x					🀄											
U+1F0Cx																🃏
U+1F17x	🅰️	🅱️													🅾️	🅿️
U+1F18x															🆎	
U+1F19x		🆑	🆒	🆓	🆔	🆕	🆖	🆗	🆘	🆙	🆚					
U+1F20x		🈁	🈂️													
U+1F21x											🈚					
U+1F22x																🈯
U+1F23x			🈲	🈳	🈴	🈵	🈶	🈷️	🈸	🈹	🈺					
U+1F25x	🉐	🉑														
U+1F30x	🌀	🌁	🌂	🌃	🌄	🌅	🌆	🌇	🌈	🌉	🌊	🌋	🌌	🌍	🌎	🌏
U+1F31x	🌐	🌑	🌒	🌓	🌔	🌕	🌖	🌗	🌘	🌙	🌚	🌛	🌜	🌝	🌞	🌟
	0	1	2	3	4	5	6	7	8	9	A	B	C	D	E	F
U+1F32x	🌠	🌡️			🌤️	🌥️	🌦️	🌧️	🌨️	🌩️	🌪️	🌫️	🌬️	🌭	🌮	🌯
U+1F33x	🌰	🌱	🌲	🌳	🌴	🌵	🌶️	🌷	🌸	🌹	🌺	🌻	🌼	🌽	🌾	🌿
U+1F34x	🍀	🍁	🍂	🍃	🍄	🍅	🍆	🍇	🍈	🍉	🍊	🍋	🍌	🍍	🍎	🍏
U+1F35x	🍐	🍑	🍒	🍓	🍔	🍕	🍖	🍗	🍘	🍙	🍚	🍛	🍜	🍝	🍞	🍟
U+1F36x	🍠	🍡	🍢	🍣	🍤	🍥	🍦	🍧	🍨	🍩	🍪	🍫	🍬	🍭	🍮	🍯
U+1F37x	🍰	🍱	🍲	🍳	🍴	🍵	🍶	🍷	🍸	🍹	🍺	🍻	🍼	🍽️	🍾	🍿
U+1F38x	🎀	🎁	🎂	🎃	🎄	🎅	🎆	🎇	🎈	🎉	🎊	🎋	🎌	🎍	🎎	🎏
U+1F39x	🎐	🎑	🎒	🎓			🎖️	🎗️		🎙️	🎚️	🎛️			🎞️	🎟️
U+1F3Ax	🎠	🎡	🎢	🎣	🎤	🎥	🎦	🎧	🎨	🎩	🎪	🎫	🎬	🎭	🎮	🎯
U+1F3Bx	🎰	🎱	🎲	🎳	🎴	🎵	🎶	🎷	🎸	🎹	🎺	🎻	🎼	🎽	🎾	🎿
U+1F3Cx	🏀	🏁	🏂	🏃	🏄	🏅	🏆	🏇	🏈	🏉	🏊	🏋️	🏌️	🏍️	🏎️	🏏
U+1F3Dx	🏐	🏑	🏒	🏓	🏔️	🏕️	🏖️	🏗️	🏘️	🏙️	🏚️	🏛️	🏜️	🏝️	🏞️	🏟️
U+1F3Ex	🏠	🏡	🏢	🏣	🏤	🏥	🏦	🏧	🏨	🏩	🏪	🏫	🏬	🏭	🏮	🏯
U+1F3Fx	🏰			🏳️	🏴	🏵️		🏷️	🏸	🏹	🏺	🏻	🏼	🏽	🏾	🏿
U+1F40x	🐀	🐁	🐂	🐃	🐄	🐅	🐆	🐇	🐈	🐉	🐊	🐋	🐌	🐍	🐎	🐏
U+1F41x	🐐	🐑	🐒	🐓	🐔	🐕	🐖	🐗	🐘	🐙	🐚	🐛	🐜	🐝	🐞	🐟
U+1F42x	🐠	🐡	🐢	🐣	🐤	🐥	🐦	🐧	🐨	🐩	🐪	🐫	🐬	🐭	🐮	🐯
U+1F43x	🐰	🐱	🐲	🐳	🐴	🐵	🐶	🐷	🐸	🐹	🐺	🐻	🐼	🐽	🐾	🐿️
U+1F44x	👀	👁️	👂	👃	👄	👅	👆	👇	👈	👉	👊	👋	👌	👍	👎	👏
U+1F45x	👐	👑	👒	👓	👔	👕	👖	👗	👘	👙	👚	👛	👜	👝	👞	👟
U+1F46x	👠	👡	👢	👣	👤	👥	👦	👧	👨	👩	👪	👫	👬	👭	👮	👯
U+1F47x	👰	👱	👲	👳	👴	👵	👶	👷	👸	👹	👺	👻	👼	👽	👾	👿
U+1F48x	💀	💁	💂	💃	💄	💅	💆	💇	💈	💉	💊	💋	💌	💍	💎	💏
U+1F49x	💐	💑	💒	💓	💔	💕	💖	💗	💘	💙	💚	💛	💜	💝	💞	💟
U+1F4Ax	💠	💡	💢	💣	💤	💥	💦	💧	💨	💩	💪	💫	💬	💭	💮	💯
U+1F4Bx	💰	💱	💲	💳	💴	💵	💶	💷	💸	💹	💺	💻	💼	💽	💾	💿
U+1F4Cx	📀	📁	📂	📃	📄	📅	📆	📇	📈	📉	📊	📋	📌	📍	📎	📏
U+1F4Dx	📐	📑	📒	📓	📔	📕	📖	📗	📘	📙	📚	📛	📜	📝	📞	📟
U+1F4Ex	📠	📡	📢	📣	📤	📥	📦	📧	📨	📩	📪	📫	📬	📭	📮	📯
U+1F4Fx	📰	📱	📲	📳	📴	📵	📶	📷	📸	📹	📺	📻	📼	📽️		📿
	0	1	2	3	4	5	6	7	8	9	A	B	C	D	E	F
U+1F50x	🔀	🔁	🔂	🔃	🔄	🔅	🔆	🔇	🔈	🔉	🔊	🔋	🔌	🔍	🔎	🔏
U+1F51x	🔐	🔑	🔒	🔓	🔔	🔕	🔖	🔗	🔘	🔙	🔚	🔛	🔜	🔝	🔞	🔟
U+1F52x	🔠	🔡	🔢	🔣	🔤	🔥	🔦	🔧	🔨	🔩	🔪	🔫	🔬	🔭	🔮	🔯
U+1F53x	🔰	🔱	🔲	🔳	🔴	🔵	🔶	🔷	🔸	🔹	🔺	🔻	🔼	🔽		
U+1F54x										🕉️	🕊️	🕋	🕌	🕍	🕎	
U+1F55x	🕐	🕑	🕒	🕓	🕔	🕕	🕖	🕗	🕘	🕙	🕚	🕛	🕜	🕝	🕞	🕟
U+1F56x	🕠	🕡	🕢	🕣	🕤	🕥	🕦	🕧								🕯️
U+1F57x	🕰️			🕳️	🕴️	🕵️	🕶️	🕷️	🕸️	🕹️	🕺					
U+1F58x								🖇️			🖊️	🖋️	🖌️	🖍️		
U+1F59x	🖐️					🖕	🖖									
U+1F5Ax					🖤	🖥️			🖨️							
U+1F5Bx		🖱️	🖲️										🖼️			
U+1F5Cx			🗂️	🗃️	🗄️											
U+1F5Dx		🗑️	🗒️	🗓️									🗜️	🗝️	🗞️	
U+1F5Ex		🗡️		🗣️					🗨️							🗯️
U+1F5Fx				🗳️							🗺️	🗻	🗼	🗽	🗾	🗿
U+1F60x	😀	😁	😂	😃	😄	😅	😆	😇	😈	😉	😊	😋	😌	😍	😎	😏
U+1F61x	😐	😑	😒	😓	😔	😕	😖	😗	😘	😙	😚	😛	😜	😝	😞	😟
U+1F62x	😠	😡	😢	😣	😤	😥	😦	😧	😨	😩	😪	😫	😬	😭	😮	😯
U+1F63x	😰	😱	😲	😳	😴	😵	😶	😷	😸	😹	😺	😻	😼	😽	😾	😿
U+1F64x	🙀	🙁	🙂	🙃	🙄	🙅	🙆	🙇	🙈	🙉	🙊	🙋	🙌	🙍	🙎	🙏
U+1F68x	🚀	🚁	🚂	🚃	🚄	🚅	🚆	🚇	🚈	🚉	🚊	🚋	🚌	🚍	🚎	🚏
U+1F69x	🚐	🚑	🚒	🚓	🚔	🚕	🚖	🚗	🚘	🚙	🚚	🚛	🚜	🚝	🚞	🚟
U+1F6Ax	🚠	🚡	🚢	🚣	🚤	🚥	🚦	🚧	🚨	🚩	🚪	🚫	🚬	🚭	🚮	🚯
U+1F6Bx	🚰	🚱	🚲	🚳	🚴	🚵	🚶	🚷	🚸	🚹	🚺	🚻	🚼	🚽	🚾	🚿
U+1F6Cx	🛀	🛁	🛂	🛃	🛄	🛅						🛋️	🛌	🛍️	🛎️	🛏️
U+1F6Dx	🛐	🛑	🛒			🛕	🛖	🛗	🛘	🛙			🛜	🛝	🛞	🛟
U+1F6Ex	🛠️	🛡️	🛢️	🛣️	🛤️	🛥️				🛩️		🛫	🛬			
U+1F6Fx	🛰️			🛳️	🛴	🛵	🛶	🛷	🛸	🛹	🛺	🛻	🛼			
U+1F7Ex	🟠	🟡	🟢	🟣	🟤	🟥	🟦	🟧	🟨	🟩	🟪	🟫				
	0	1	2	3	4	5	6	7	8	9	A	B	C	D	E	F
U+1F7Fx	🟰															
U+1F90x													🤌	🤍	🤎	🤏
U+1F91x	🤐	🤑	🤒	🤓	🤔	🤕	🤖	🤗	🤘	🤙	🤚	🤛	🤜	🤝	🤞	🤟
U+1F92x	🤠	🤡	🤢	🤣	🤤	🤥	🤦	🤧	🤨	🤩	🤪	🤫	🤬	🤭	🤮	🤯
U+1F93x	🤰	🤱	🤲	🤳	🤴	🤵	🤶	🤷	🤸	🤹	🤺		🤼	🤽	🤾	🤿
U+1F94x	🥀	🥁	🥂	🥃	🥄	🥅		🥇	🥈	🥉	🥊	🥋	🥌	🥍	🥎	🥏
U+1F95x	🥐	🥑	🥒	🥓	🥔	🥕	🥖	🥗	🥘	🥙	🥚	🥛	🥜	🥝	🥞	🥟
U+1F96x	🥠	🥡	🥢	🥣	🥤	🥥	🥦	🥧	🥨	🥩	🥪	🥫	🥬	🥭	🥮	🥯
U+1F97x	🥰	🥱	🥲	🥳	🥴	🥵	🥶	🥷	🥸	🥹	🥺	🥻	🥼	🥽	🥾	🥿
U+1F98x	🦀	🦁	🦂	🦃	🦄	🦅	🦆	🦇	🦈	🦉	🦊	🦋	🦌	🦍	🦎	🦏
U+1F99x	🦐	🦑	🦒	🦓	🦔	🦕	🦖	🦗	🦘	🦙	🦚	🦛	🦜	🦝	🦞	🦟
U+1F9Ax	🦠	🦡	🦢	🦣	🦤	🦥	🦦	🦧	🦨	🦩	🦪	🦫	🦬	🦭	🦮	🦯
U+1F9Bx	🦰	🦱	🦲	🦳	🦴	🦵	🦶	🦷	🦸	🦹	🦺	🦻	🦼	🦽	🦾	🦿
U+1F9Cx	🧀	🧁	🧂	🧃	🧄	🧅	🧆	🧇	🧈	🧉	🧊	🧋	🧌	🧍	🧎	🧏
U+1F9Dx	🧐	🧑	🧒	🧓	🧔	🧕	🧖	🧗	🧘	🧙	🧚	🧛	🧜	🧝	🧞	🧟
U+1F9Ex	🧠	🧡	🧢	🧣	🧤	🧥	🧦	🧧	🧨	🧩	🧪	🧫	🧬	🧭	🧮	🧯
U+1F9Fx	🧰	🧱	🧲	🧳	🧴	🧵	🧶	🧷	🧸	🧹	🧺	🧻	🧼	🧽	🧾	🧿
U+1FA7x	🩰	🩱	🩲	🩳	🩴	🩵	🩶	🩷	🩸	🩹	🩺	🩻	🩼			
U+1FA8x	🪀	🪁	🪂	🪃	🪄	🪅	🪆	🪇	🪈	🪉	🪊	🪋	🪌	🪍	🪎	🪏
U+1FA9x	🪐	🪑	🪒	🪓	🪔	🪕	🪖	🪗	🪘	🪙	🪚	🪛	🪜	🪝	🪞	🪟
U+1FAAx	🪠	🪡	🪢	🪣	🪤	🪥	🪦	🪧	🪨	🪩	🪪	🪫	🪬	🪭	🪮	🪯
U+1FABx	🪰	🪱	🪲	🪳	🪴	🪵	🪶	🪷	🪸	🪹	🪺	🪻	🪼	🪽	🪾	🪿
U+1FACx	🫀	🫁	🫂	🫃	🫄	🫅	🫆		🫈				🫌	🫍	🫎	🫏
U+1FADx	🫐	🫑	🫒	🫓	🫔	🫕	🫖	🫗	🫘	🫙	🫚	🫛	🫜	🫝		🫟
U+1FAEx	🫠	🫡	🫢	🫣	🫤	🫥	🫦	🫧	🫨	🫩	🫪	🫫				🫯
U+1FAFx	🫰	🫱	🫲	🫳	🫴	🫵	🫶	🫷	🫸	🫹	🫺					
	0	1	2	3	4	5	6	7	8	9	A	B	C	D	E	F
Notes 1.As of Unicode version 18.0 2.Grey areas indicate non-emoji or non-assigned code points 3."UTR #51: Unicode Emoji". Unicode Consortium. 4."UCD: Emoji Data for UTR #51". Unicode Consortium. January 30, 2026.

== See also ==
- Core Text
- Noto Color Emoji
- Genmoji - AI-generated emoji
