= Feminist Internet (collective) =

Feminist Internet is an art activist collective devoted to making the internet a more feminist space. Feminist Internet was a project that began out of University of the Arts London in September 2017. It began as a two-week studio project where 16 people came together to imagine how they could build a more feminist internet. The collective is made up of spatial designers, graphic designers, activists, artists, poets, writers, journalists, video makers, performers, art directors, photographers, and researchers. They campaign for eradicating online violence against women, trans people, LGBTQ+ people, disabled people and other minorities and promote gender equality, equal rights & justice for all. Feminist Internet is non-profit collective supported by UAL Careers and Employability, the Teaching and Learning Exchange and UAL Futures, bringing UAL students, staff and industry together across disciplines to invent better futures.

== Work and events ==
The Feminist Internet organises a range of events including seminars, panel discussions, reading groups, performances and other interventions to spread the word about gender equality and the internet. Previous events have included a seminar series at University of the Arts London on topics such as feminisms and the future of work, technology and representation, technological feminisms and biocapital and the female body. They have also hosted a 'Digital Clinic' at London arts venue Somerset House in December 2017 and a 'Geekender' in March 2018 at The Photographers' Gallery in London. The Feminist Internet have collaborated with organisations such as Glitch!UK and Amnesty International and people like Charlie Craggs.

== Manifesto ==
The Feminist Internet's work is defined by their eight-point manifesto.

- The Feminist Internet ERASES feminism. They believe that if they are successful, they will have erased the need for feminism by creating a world where nobody is oppressed, silenced, exposed or confined based on sex, gender, race or disability and making the internet a space that causes no harm, and where all people are equal.
- The Feminist Internet INTEGRATES the physical and digital. The Feminist Internet believes that both the online and offline make up the everyday experiences of those with access to the internet. They use the online to affect change offline, and the offline to affect change online.
- The Feminist Internet COOPERATES not competes. The Feminist Internet is against the competitive individualism of today’s world. They believes in collectively building an internet where information and opportunities can be accessed by all that is not driven by a profit motive, but by a belief in the power of solidarity.
- The Feminist Internet ERADICATES violence. The Feminist Internet enables the systematic dismantling of all forms of online violence including rape culture, hate speech, and trolling. It abolishes unlawful rape porn sites/pornography and any other material contributing to rape culture.
- The Feminist Internet REDEFINES value. The Feminist Internet redefines value by exploring alternatives to consumer culture. They question the relentless commodification of bodies, and recognise value as something that should be defined by more than capitalist profit motives.
- The Feminist Internet CONFRONTS uncomfortable truths. The Feminist Internet looks itself in the mirror and is aware of its own privileges and powers. It acknowledges the negative experiences of marginalised groups, and supports their online movements towards greater equality. It does not swamp its users with distractions from the needs and concerns of their global peers.
- The Feminist Internet RE-CODES gender. The Feminist Internet challenges preconceptions of gender to bring a variety of experiences to the surface. It does not guide or police experiences according to perceived gender and allows all experiences to be broadcast, erasing the limiting myth of the universal ‘type’ of person.
- The Feminist Internet EDUCATES. The Feminist Internet believes that education is the key to eradicating ignorance and prejudice. Through listening to and learning from its multitude of voices and their stories, it asserts that there is no one universal experience or learning style. It enables access to all information, but particularly promotes education around sexual health and identity politics.
