= Palmer Trinity School =

Coordinates: 25.6038889°N 80.3211111°W

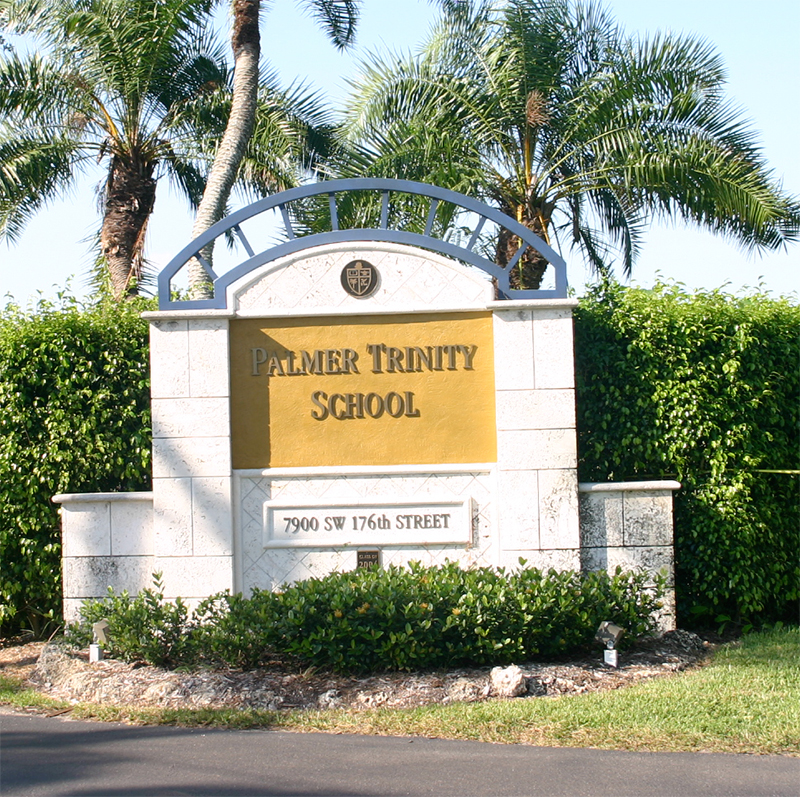
- Palmetto Bay, FL, USA

Information
- Type: Private
- Established: 1991 (when Palmer School [founded in 1972] and Trinity Episcopal School [founded in 1981] merged)
- Dean: Brook De Melo Gomes
- Head of school: Patrick Roberts
- Enrollment: 800
- Colors: Navy Blue, Gold,
- Mascot: Falcons
- Rivals: Ransom Everglades School Westminster Christian School
- Website: https://www.palmertrinity.org/

Palmer Trinity School is an independent, college-preparatory, coeducational Episcopal day school located on 60 acres in Palmetto Bay, Florida (a Miami suburb). The school currently enrolls 800 students in grades 6–12.

Palmer Trinity is the only Episcopal middle school and secondary school in Miami-Dade County, and along with Saint Andrew's School in Boca Raton, is one of two secondary schools in the Episcopal Diocese of Southeast Florida. The school is accredited by the National Association of Independent Schools (NAIS) and the Southern Association of Colleges and Schools and the Florida Council of Independent Schools.

== History ==
Palmer Trinity School was formed in 1991 when Palmer School (founded in 1972 and named for Rose Palmer O’Neil, the mother of three students) and Trinity Episcopal School (founded in 1981) merged. The school was formerly located in the census-designated place of Cutler until the incorporation of Palmetto Bay on September 10, 2002.

Palmer Trinity was badly damaged by Hurricane Andrew in August 1992, but one building was used to host the 82nd Airborne for 6 weeks in the aftermath.

After the merger, Palmer Trinity gradually grew from 300 to 650 students. A Humanities Building, Music Center, Fitness Facility, Math/Science Building, and expanded Library were added to the original three buildings.

Palmer Trinity's campus incorporates South Florida flora and fauna, including gumbo limbo trees, royal poincianas, palms, ferns, orchids, iguanas, and peacocks. It has the largest grounds of any independent school in Miami-Dade County.

It has encouraged the use of wireless laptop computers since 1999, and has 50 athletic teams.

Today Palmer Trinity’s students, over 50% of whom are bilingual, come from 37 countries. Students come from Christian, Jewish, Islamic, and Hindu religious backgrounds.

Palmer Trinity has expanded its campus to almost 60 acres, including 33 acres to the south of the original campus, and a Head of School home.

The school's mascot is a falcon, and it takes its logo from the Atlanta Falcons.

The school's current head of school is Patrick Roberts; the middle school principal is Peter Tolmach and the upper school principal is Ashley Chapman.

== The Coral Lab ==
The Coral Lab at Palmer Trinity School is used for science classes and sustainability education.

The school's Coral Lab is an interdisciplinary center for education, training, and research in marine biology engaging in research in the laboratory and in the field, studying ocean organisms and environmental problems. Many students ultimately choose a career in marine science, biology, or policy. Courses offered include marine conservation, biology of corals, coral propagation, aquarium fish breeding, and mangrove ecology.

== Breakthrough Miami partnership ==
Starting during the 2009–2010 school year, Palmer Trinity School partnered with Breakthrough Miami, an academic enrichment program that uses a student-teaching-student model targeted towards under-resourced scholars. Their partnership with Breakthrough Miami gave way to Breakthrough's first expansion site into Southwest Miami-Dade County. During the summer more than 150 rising 5th-, 6th-, 7th-, and 8th-grade students visit the school for Breakthrough's Summer Institute at PTS, and it hosts sessions throughout the school year as well, where Palmer Trinity students can volunteer as Teaching Assistants or Teaching Fellows.

Breakthrough Miami is modeled after the Summerbridge (later Breakthrough Collaborative) program founded in San Francisco, California, by Louis Loufbourrow in 1978.

== Notable alumni ==
- Shea Adam (Class of 2008), sports commentator
- Angela Guzman, graphic designer best known for designing the Apple Emoji
- Tim Hardaway Jr. (freshman year only), professional basketball player
- Rodrigo Lehtinen, first openly transgender child of a sitting member of Congress
- Alejandro Melean (Class of 2005), member of Bolivia national football team
- Ciara Michel (Class of 2003), member of 2012 British Olympic volleyball team
- Patrick Murphy (Class of 2001), US congressman (18th congressional district)
