= Angela Guzman =

American graphic designer

- Born: Bogotá, Colombia
- Education: Rhode Island School of Design (BFA, 2006 / MFA, 2009)
- Occupations: Designer and entrepreneur
- Years active: 2008–present
- Known for: designing the original set of Apple Emoji
- Website: angelaguzman.co

Angela Guzman is a Colombian-American graphic designer best known for designing the original set of Apple Emoji as a design intern at Apple.

== Early life and education ==
Guzman was born in Bogotá, Colombia and raised in Key Largo, Florida. She attended high school at Palmer Trinity School in Miami, Florida. In 2006, Guzman graduated from the Rhode Island School of Design (RISD) with a Bachelors of Fine Arts in Industrial Design, followed by a Master of Fine Arts in Graphic Design in 2009.

== Career ==
Prior to completing her Masters of Fine Arts (MFA), Guzman was offered an internship position at Apple on the iPhone design team in 2008. As an intern working with Raymond Sepulveda she was responsible for designing hundreds of the original emojis found on Apple devices, starting with the engagement ring. After receiving her MFA, Guzman returned to Apple and worked there for five years on projects including FaceTime, iMessage, and additional emoji sets. Subsequently, she has worked at Airbnb and Google where she managed experiences found on Google Assistant. As of 2020 Guzman is the CEO and founder of Tijiko, a company centered on digital coaching. She also speaks on the standardization of user interfaces and user design.
