= Charlie Craggs =

British transgender actress, activist and author

- Born: 1992 (age 33–34); London, England
- Education: London College of Fashion
- Occupations: Actress, author
- Known for: Transgender activism

Charlie Craggs (born 1992) is a British transgender actress, activist, and author from London.

== Early and personal life ==
Craggs was born on a council estate in Ladbroke Grove, West London. She later attended the London College of Fashion. Growing up, Craggs struggled with gender dysphoria, but seeing Nadia Almada win the fifth series of Big Brother in 2004 helped her understand that it was possible to transition.

== Career ==
In 2013, Craggs launched her "Nail Transphobia" campaign which provided free manicures to people, allowing them to chat with a trans person about their experiences, in an attempt to reduce transphobia. The campaign began as a university project and grew to become a pop-up salon that appeared at different events and locations. The impact of the campaign was recognized in 2015 when Craggs was number 40 in The Independent newspaper's 2015 "Rainbow List" of the 101 most Influential LGBTI people in the UK and again in 2016 when she led the 2016 "New Radicals" list compiled by Nesta and The Observer newspaper.

In 2017, Craggs first book, To My Trans Sisters, a collection of letters by successful trans women was published by Jessica Kingsley Publishers. In 2018 the book was a finalist in the anthology category of the 30th Lambda Literary Awards.

Craggs began a campaign in 2018 for inclusion of a transgender flag emoji in Unicode, which was subsequently included in 2020. She and other activists popularized the transgender community's use of the lobster emoji in lieu of the flag while it had not yet been added.

In 2021, Craggs fronted the BBC Three documentary Transitioning Teens about transgender teenagers waiting to be seen by the NHS regarding their transitions.

In 2022, Craggs played Cleo, one of the leading roles in the Doctor Who spin-off podcast Doctor Who: Redacted, making her the second transgender companion in the show's history. The BBC Sounds podcast was created and written by Juno Dawson and its first season featured Jodie Whittaker in her role as the Thirteenth Doctor.
