= Pineapple emoji =

Emoji icon

A rendering of the pineapple emoji in Noto fonts

The pineapple emoji (U+1F34D 🍍 PINEAPPLE) was approved as part of Unicode 6.0 in 2010.

It can mean "complicated relationship status" in texting or social media. It is also used to indicate that one is open to taking part in "swinger" activities.

It can also be as a shorthand or code for "cannabis" or "getting high". The usage may be a reference to the stoner film Pineapple Express.

One scholarly critic found the pineapple emoji distasteful as an expression of British imperialism, and attendant "codes of racism and classism".

== See also ==
- List of emojis
- Pineapple mania
