= Lobster emoji =

Emoji added to Unicode in 2018

The lobster emoji, as depicted in the Fluent Design System (left), Noto Emoji (center), and Twemoji (right)

Lobster (U+1F99E 🦞 LOBSTER) is an emoji that became part of the Unicode character set in 2018 as part of Unicode 11.0. The emoji's addition had been lobbied for by businessman Luke Holden and U.S. Senator Angus King, both from Maine. When the emoji was approved, online emoji encyclopedia Emojipedia created a mockup of it, which was criticized for lacking two legs and was promptly updated. Following its release, Lobster was used by transgender rights activists as a symbol of transgender identity and to campaign for a transgender flag emoji.

== History and design ==
Avatar of Senator Angus King

Senator Angus King
(@AngusKing)
tweeted:

Great news for Maine - we're getting a lobster emoji!!! Thanks to @unicode for recognizing the impact of this critical crustacean, in Maine and across the country.

Yours truly,

Senator 🐮👑

February 7, 2018

In August 2017, the Unicode Consortium announced a list of 67 candidates that could potentially become standard emojis the following year. Among them was a candidate lobster, which was noticed by Maine businessman Luke Holden, founder of the restaurant chain Luke's Lobsters. Holden created a petition on Change.org to "Make the Lobster Emoji Happen", which attracted 1,500 signatures in the first day; people were frustrated that at the time, the only crustacean emojis available were the crab and shrimp emojis. U.S. Senator Angus King of Maine wrote to the Unicode Consortium the next month to support the push for a lobster emoji, observing that there were more lobster-related queries in Internet traffic data than for crabs. He also observed that lobster was Maine's largest export; the state had exported $382 million in lobsters the previous year ($500.00 million in 2024).

The Consortium announced in February 2018 that they would add Lobster, alongside 156 other emojis, as part of Unicode 11.0. Users on Twitter pointed out that the draft design, which was created by Emojipedia and published on Unicode's website, had two legs missing and a malformed tail; the design on the Change.org petition had all ten legs, including the claws. Within the month, Emojipedia released an updated design for Lobster, which corrected the anatomical mistakes. An article published in Popular Science criticized the reaction to the initial design, arguing that emojis should be designed with their eventual use in mind, not anatomical accuracy; the article also pointed out that most users would not see either design, since different platforms implement their own designs of the emojis on Unicode's list, while Unicode just ensures cross-platform compatibility.

== Usage ==
Character information
Preview	🦞	
Unicode name	LOBSTER	
Encodings	decimal	hex
Unicode	129438	U+1F99E
UTF-8	240 159 166 158	F0 9F A6 9E
UTF-16	55358 56734	D83E DD9E
Numeric character reference	&#129438;	&#x1F99E;

The lobster emoji has been used by transgender communities as self-representation. In 2018, activist Charlie Craggs began a Change.org petition asking for the Unicode Consortium to add a transgender flag emoji to the Unicode Standard. Referring to the "frustration and confusion" of not being able to express their identities, Craggs and other activists began using the lobster emoji in its place, "hijacking the lobster" as a symbol for the transgender community with the hashtag #ClawsOutForTrans. In a video describing the petition, Craggs stated that lobsters were selected in part because of their gynandromorphism. Some in the transgender community also pointed to a feeling of unfairness that Unicode was not representing trans people, but responded to lobbying for a lobster emoji. Craggs echoed that sentiment, commenting: "Surely we deserve the same rights you have afforded crustaceans?".

Reactions to the transgender community's use of the lobster emoji were varied. Luke Holden, who created the original petition for a lobster emoji, welcomed its use, but Matt Moonen of EqualityMaine stated that he "would be surprised if [such use] caught on" in Maine. Writing for Out, Harron Walker described feeling "amused but mostly just confused" about such use, but noted its increased popularity in Europe compared to North America. In a 2019 analysis, Elena Giannoulis and Lukas R. A. Wilde pointed to the lobster emoji's use by the transgender community as an example of the broader movement of cultural representation through emoji in online communication.

The emoji also gained use as a standalone verb meaning 'to kill [oneself]' among Brazilian Portuguese speakers on social media, after a viral video circulated of a lobster seemingly committing suicide by jumping into boiling oil. According to an article in Glossa, one speaker relayed that the emoji was pronounced lagostar, the verb form of 'lobster', when spoken aloud.

== See also ==
- Dinosaur emojis
- Gaysper
