= No Good =

The phrase No Good may refer to:

== Music ==
=== Bands ===
- No Good (group), an American hip-hop group

=== Albums ===
- No Good (Ivy Levan album), 2015
- No Good (Elly-May Barnes album), 2024

=== Songs ===
- "No Good", a song by Kaleo from A/B (2016)
- "No Good", a song by Kate Voegele from Don't Look Away (2007)
- "No Good", a song by Nappy Roots from Wooden Leather (2003)
- "No Good", a song by Plan B from Who Needs Actions When You Got Words (2006)
- "No Good (Attack the Radical)", a song by Pantera from Vulgar Display of Power (1992)
- "No Good (Start the Dance)", a 1994 song by the Prodigy
  - No Good (Fedde Le Grand song), a 2013 remake of above

== Other uses ==
- Spirit Hunter: NG, a video game
