= Pinched fingers =

Italian hand gesture

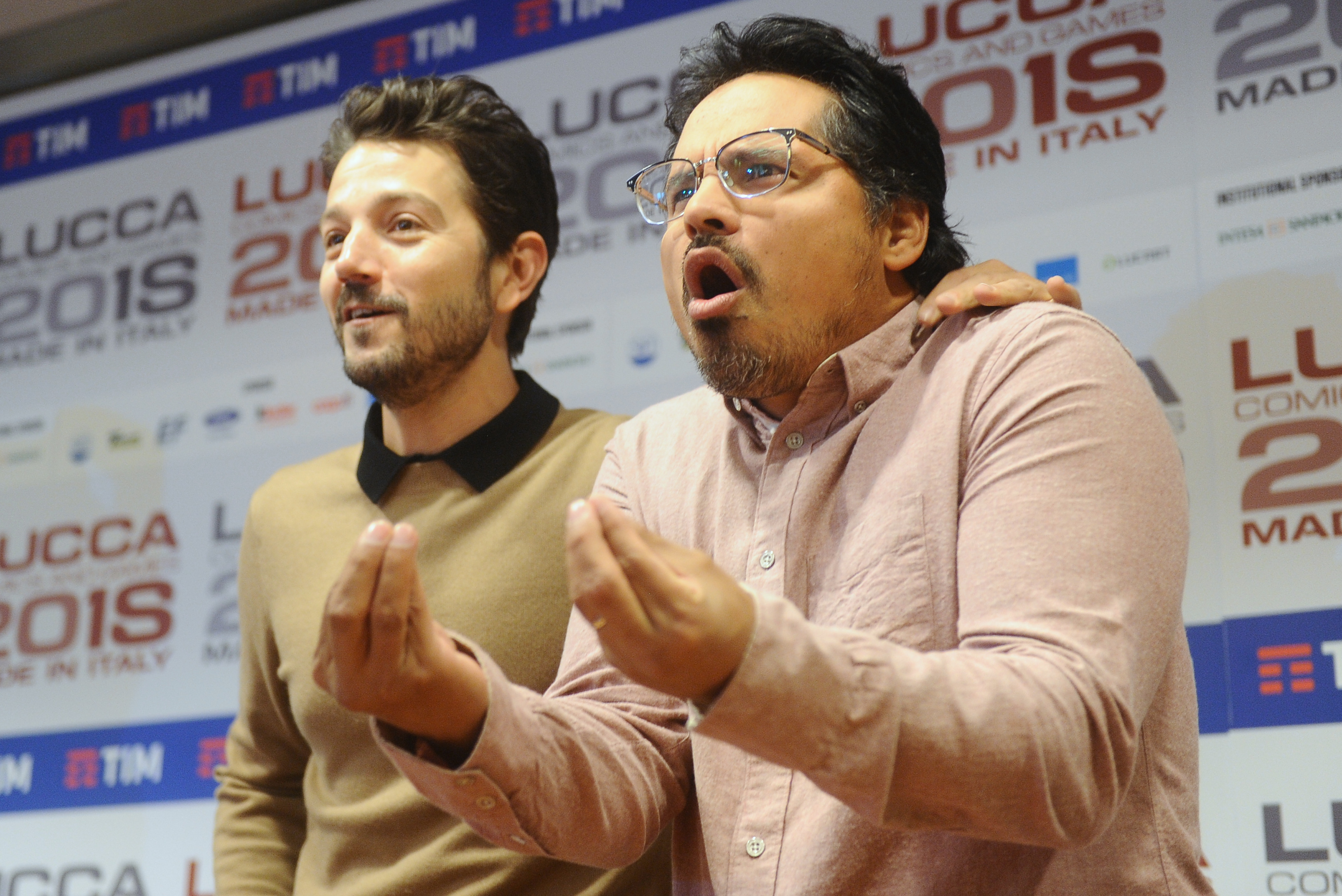
Michael Peña doing the gesture alongside Diego Luna at Lucca Comics & Games in 2018

Pinched fingers is a polysemious hand gesture, mainly associated with Italian gesticulation. It is meant to express disbelief at what the other person is saying or doing, and/or to ridicule their opinions.

There is no single codified term to identify this gesture in Italian, as it is variously described as mano a borsa (fingertip purse or purse hand), mano a tulipano (finger tulip), or mano a pigna (finger pinecone). In English, it is sometimes referred as Che vuoi? (Italian pronunciation: [ke vˈvwɔi]; transl. "what do you want?"), ma che vuoi?, ma che dici?,ma che stai dicendo? ("what are you talking about?"), or simply che? ("what?").

== Gesture ==
This gesture is produced where the tips of all the fingers of one hand are brought together to form an "upward pointing cone", with the hand then being moved up and down either from the wrist or forearm. The hand can be motionless while performing this hand gesture, or can also be shaken up and down, if the person wants to express impatience.

== Usage ==
While it is particularly common in Southern Italy, it is a gesture that is widely used across the country. The frequency and speed of vertical motion indicates the level of frustration of the speaker.

The gesture is also widely used in Argentina, Brazil, Uruguay and other Latin American countries with large Italian diasporas, with similar connotations.

=== In West Asia and North Africa ===
Gesture for Hebrew word rega (רֶגַע, "a moment") as used in Israeli Sign Language

In the Arab world and in Israel, the pinched hand gesture has the meanings "wait a minute" and "have patience", corresponding to Arabic words sabar (صَبْرْ, "patience"), shway, shway (شْوَيْ شْوَيْ, "little-by-little"), and Hebrew rak rega (רַק רֶגַע, "only a moment") and savlanut (סַבְלָנוּת, "patience").

=== In Mexico ===
Among Mexicans and people of Mexican heritage, the gesture is used with a slight repetitive opening and closing of the fingers to indicate "coward" or suggest cowardice, used insultingly.

=== Emoji ===
The emoji for the gesture was proposed in 2019 as submission L2/19-159, approved as part of Unicode 13.0 in 2020, and added later that year as U+1F90C 🤌 PINCHED FINGERS in Supplemental Symbols and Pictographs Unicode block.
