= Nail polish emoji =

Emoji representing painting fingernails

The nail polish emoji on Noto Emoji

The nail polish emoji (💅) is an emoji of nail polish being applied to a nail.

It has been used in English-language communities to signify "non-caring fabulousness" and "anything from shutting haters down to a sense of accomplishment".

== Unicode ==
Character information
Preview	💅	
Unicode name	NAIL POLISH	
Encodings	decimal	hex
Unicode	128133	U+1F485
UTF-8	240 159 146 133	F0 9F 92 85
UTF-16	55357 56453	D83D DC85
Numeric character reference	&#128133;	&#x1F485;

== See also ==
- Nail art
