= Slider (computing) =

Graphical control element

An example of a slider widget with values 0 through 9, currently set to 3

A slider or track bar is a graphical control element with which a user may set a value by moving an indicator. In some cases the user may also click on a point on the slider to change the setting. It is different from a scrollbar in that it is not continuous but used to adjust a value without changing the format of the display or the other information on the screen.

Its most popular use is for viewing and jumping to a playback position in media player software.

== Usage with progress bars ==
Sliders are also combined with progress bars in the playback of streaming media over a network connection (e.g., YouTube videos) in order to show the content buffering position versus the playback position. This is done by superimposing a colored shaded area (progress bar) on top of the slider, indicating whether the user can "jump" forward or not.
