= Red Circle =

Red Circle may refer to:

- Red Circle (law firms), a group of elite Chinese law firms
- Red Circle (publishing), Martin Goodman's group of pulp magazine publishing corporations
- Red Circle (typeface) a typeface based on the c. 1930 packaging of A&P coffees
- Red Circle Coffee, a brand sold by the American grocery chain A&P
- Red Circle Comics, now Dark Circle Comics, an Archie Comics imprint
- The Red Circle (serial), a 1915 American silent film serial
- Le Cercle Rouge (lit. The Red Circle), a 1970 French crime film
- Red Circle (2025 film), a Nigerian crime-thriller film

== See also ==
- "The Adventure of the Red Circle", a Sherlock Holmes story
- Red Circle Authors, a British publishing house that specialises in Japanese fiction
