= Grimace =

Grimace may refer to:

- A type of facial expression usually of disgust, disapproval, or pain
- Grimace (composer), a French composer active in the mid-to-late 14th century
- Grimace (character), a McDonaldland marketing character developed to promote the restaurant's milkshakes
- Grimace scale, a method of assessing the occurrence or severity of pain
- Grimace Shake, a McDonald's milkshake
