= Mute =

Muteness is a speech disorder in which a person lacks the ability to speak.

Mute, Mutes or the Mute may also refer to:

== Arts and entertainment ==
=== Film and television ===
- Mute (2005 film), a short film by Melissa Joan Hart
- Mute (2018 film), a science-fiction thriller directed by Duncan Jones
- "Mute" (The Twilight Zone), a 1963 episode of The Twilight Zone
- Muted (TV series), a 2023 Spanish Netflix series
- Mutes, anthropomorphic animals in the American animated television series Kipo and the Age of Wonderbeasts

=== Music ===
- Mute (music), a device used to alter the sound of a musical instrument
- Left-hand muting or palm mute, guitar muting techniques
- Mute Records, a record label in the United Kingdom
- Mute (album), a 2000 indie rock compilation album from Hush Records
- Muted (album), a 2003 album from hip hop artist Alias

=== In print ===
- Mute (novel), a 1981 novel by Piers Anthony
- "Mute" (short story), by Stephen King
- Mute, a character in Tom Clancy's Rainbow Six Siege
- Mute (magazine), an online magazine of culture and politics

== People ==
- Múte Bourup Egede (born 1987), Prime Minister of Greenland
- Shō Gen (1528–1572), king of the Ryukyu Kingdom called Gen the mute
- Pârvu Mutu (1657–1735), Wallachian Romanian muralist and church painter nicknamed Pârvu the Mute

== Other uses ==
- Mute (death customs), a professional mourner in Victorian and other European cultures
- Mute (food), a soup from Colombia
- Mute Island, part of the Society Islands of French Polynesia
- A silent letter, in phonology
- A professional mourner is sometimes called a mute

== See also ==
- Carlos Gardel (1890–1935), French-born Argentine singer, songwriter, composer and actor known ironically as "El Mudo" ("The Mute")
- Juan Fernández Navarrete (1526–1579), Spanish Mannerist painter called "El Mudo"
