= Raising hands =

Gesture used to raise attention

Raising hands is a gesture involving lifting either one or both arms above one's head, which has a number of possible meanings, depending on the context of the gesture.

The action of hand-raising is involved in a number of greeting hand gestures, such as waving, salutes, and high fives. The raised fist, an action used mostly in left-wing political endeavours and by oppressed minorities, is a symbol of defiance and solidarity. The Nazi salute is demonstrated by flattening the right hand, straightening the arm and raising it just above one's shoulder. A 'show of hands' is defined as a vote wherein people raise one hand to demonstrate their support for or opposition towards an idea.

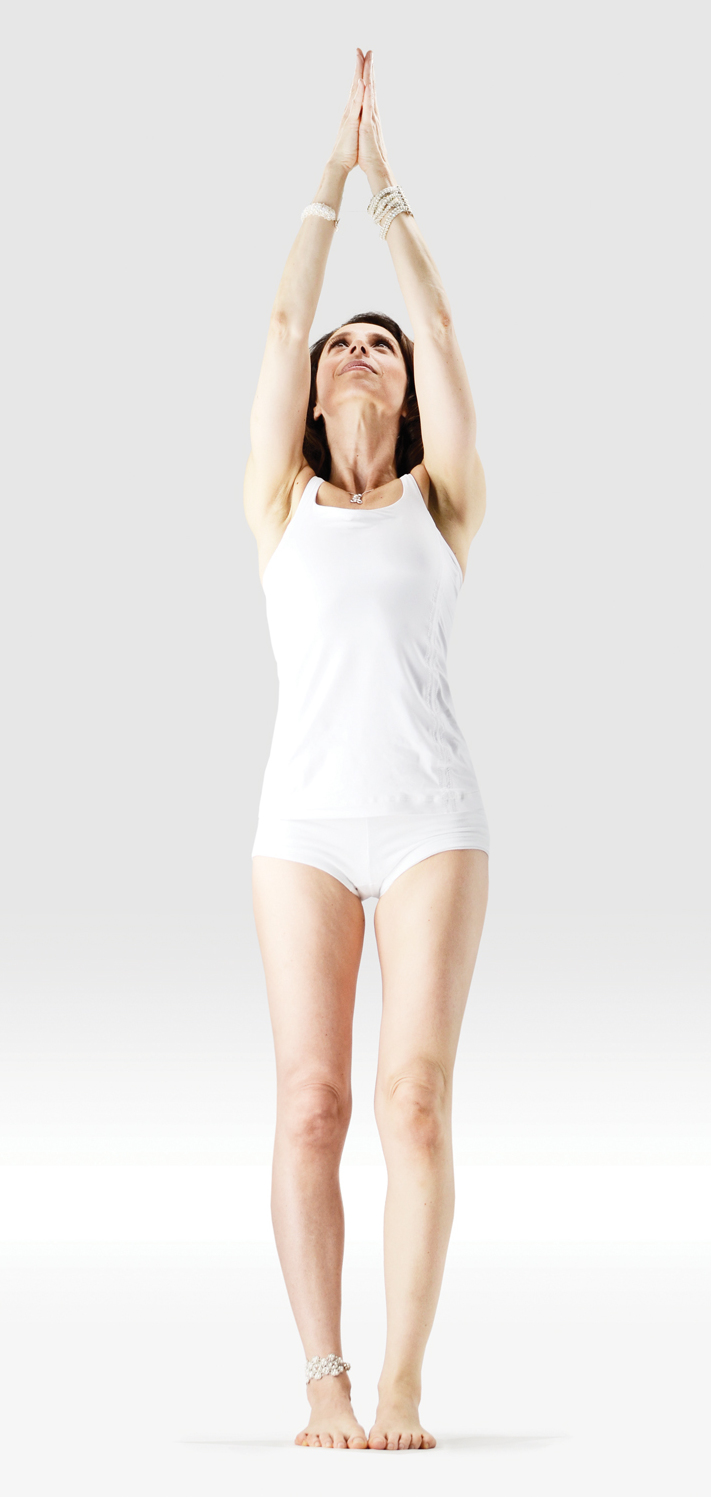
Urdhva Vrikshasana

Hand-raising is also involved in actions of other disciplines. One such discipline is yoga, which incorporates many poses with one or both arms extended into the air, such as Urdhva Vrikshasana, which translates to ‘raised hands pose’.

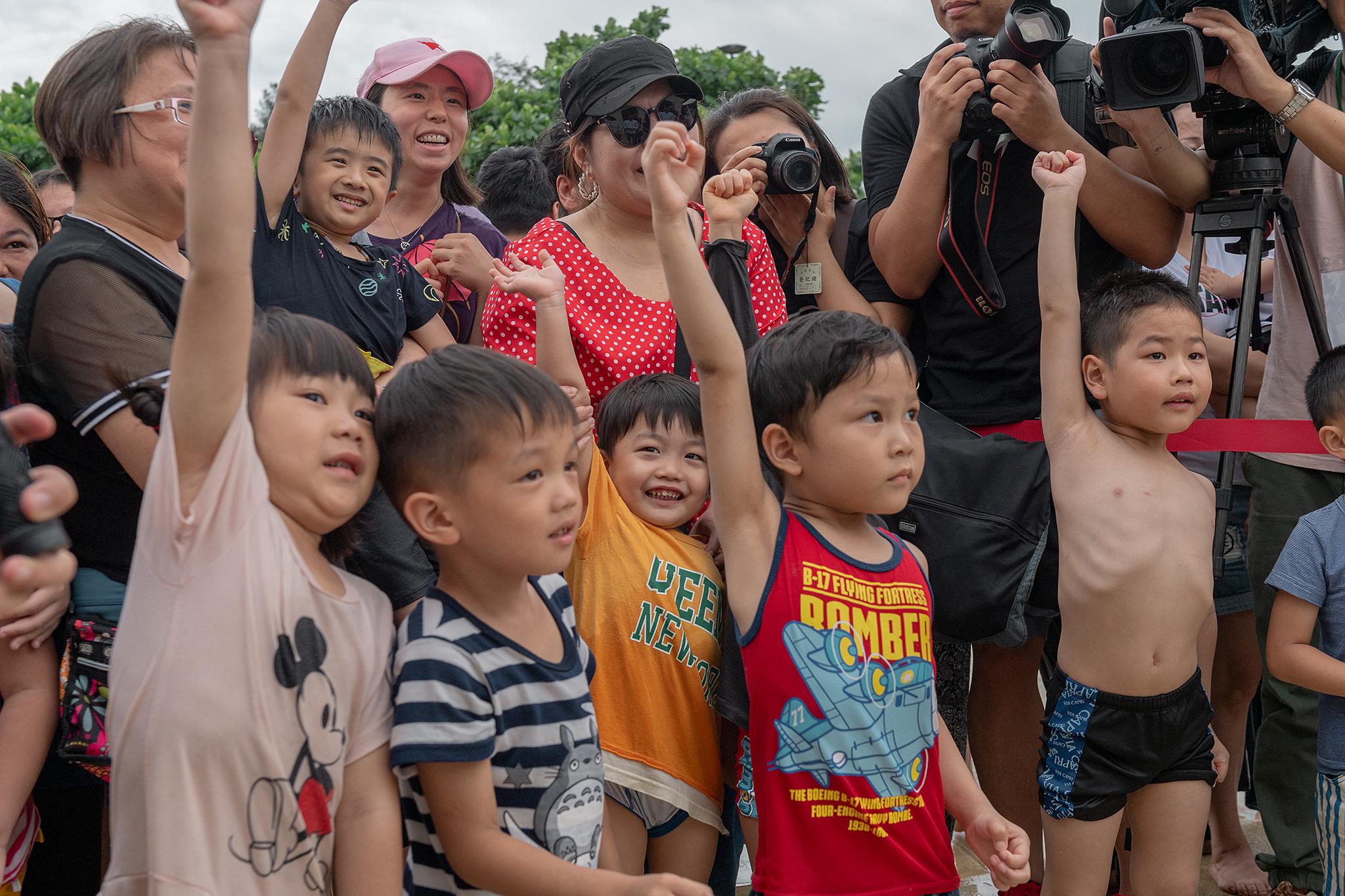
Children raise their hands in Taiwan

== Origin ==
Although the origin of hand-raising is not known, it has been recorded throughout history. For instance, in the era of slave-owning, when slaves accompanied their masters to public events, they were required to hold their hand up if they needed to be excused for any reason until they were acknowledged and given permission by their masters.

Likewise, the origin of the phrase ‘a show of hands’ has not been fully ascertained. The first written documentation of the voting method occurred in the early 20th century, one such example in The Pacific Commercial Advertiser (1905); "Dowsett seconded the motion, which carried 8 to 4 on a show of hands."

== In religion ==
=== The Bible ===
In the Bible, there are many references to hand-raising, clapping, and raising both hands in prayer. Some ancient inscriptions found in Israel also refer to lifting hands in prayer. When Moses raises his hands to God, this action expresses him seeking divine help and is linked with prayer. The first letter Paul wrote to Timothy expresses a desire that "men pray everywhere, lifting up holy hands, without wrath and doubting."

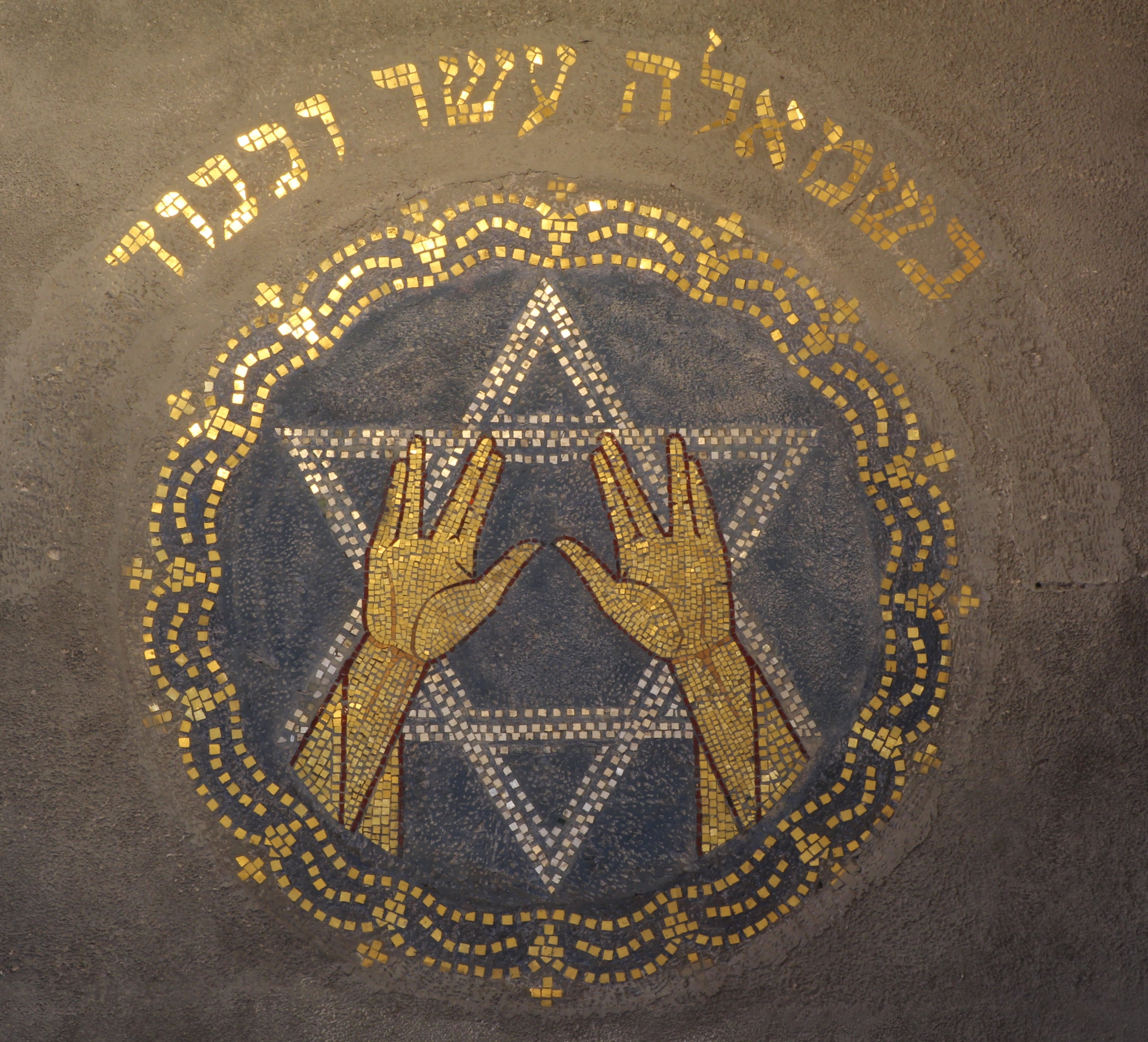
The Priestly Blessing in Judaism involves a kohen raising his hands while making this gesture.

Studying the gestures and body language mentioned in the Bible can aid understanding of its meaning. The Israelite gesture of raising both hands to pray is referenced in 24 biblical passages through six different Hebrew idioms, each of which can be translated to "lift up the hands". This action demonstrates adoration in the context of religious worship. One such reference; "Let us lift up our hearts and our hands to our God in heaven", indicates a connection between hand-raising and heartfelt worship.

One specific example from the Bible conveying the importance of hand-raising comes from Exodus 17:8-13, in the battle between the Israelites and Amalekites. Moses tells Joshua he will stand upon the hill holding the "staff of God" during the battle. "As long as Moses held up his hands, the Israelites were winning, but whenever he lowered his hands, the Amalekites were winning." When Moses grew tired, Aaron and Hur helped him to keep his arms raised until both the day and battle ended.

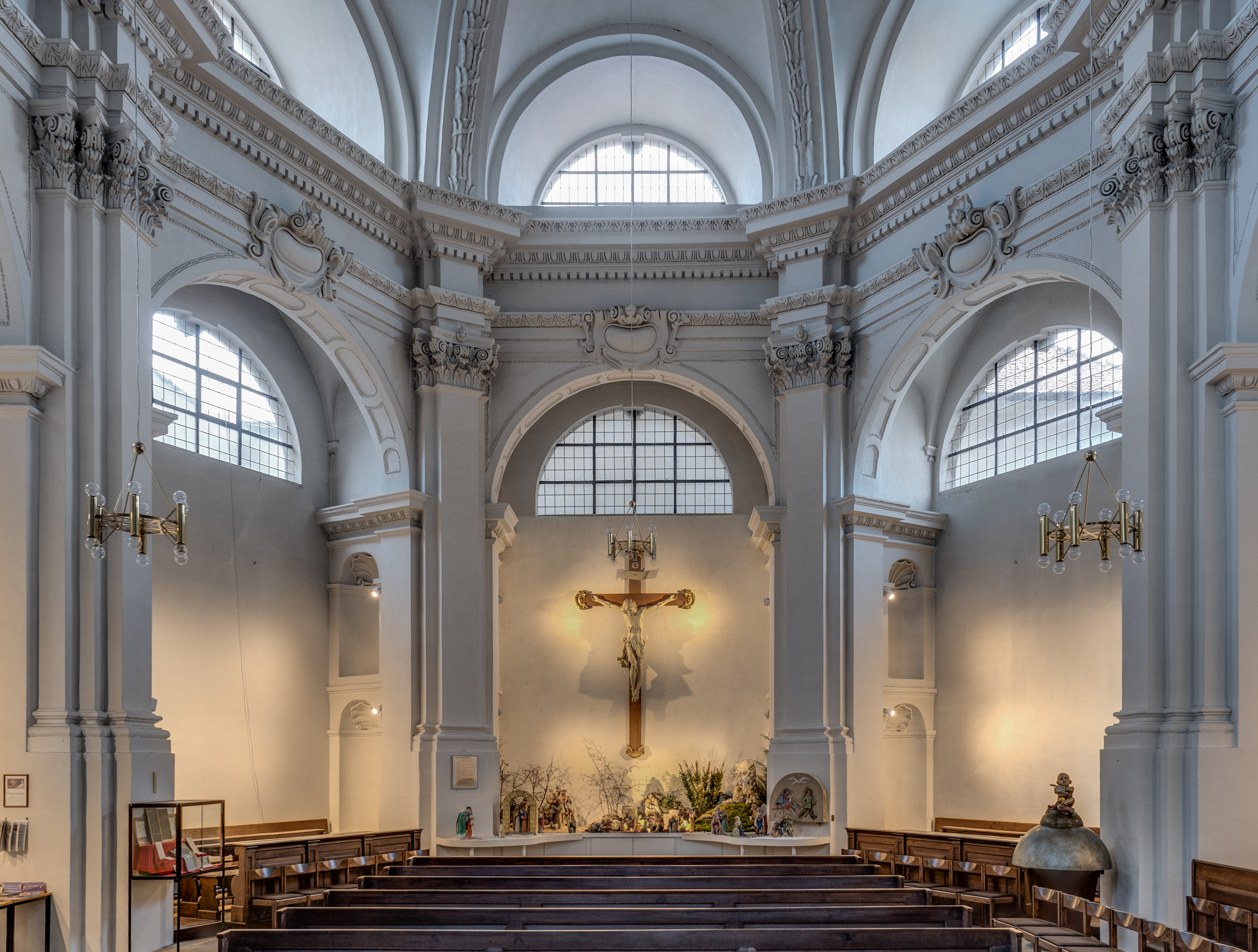
Crucifix above the Nativity scene in the transept of St. Stephan's Church in Bamberg, Germany

=== Art and crucifixion ===
A number of pieces of Ancient Levantine art depict prayer through the raising of both hands to just above the chin, with the figures either standing or kneeling.

The symbol of the cross itself, representing Jesus’ crucifixion, is another reference to hand-raising, as Jesus was nailed to the cross with his hands raised. This event has been depicted countless times in art, architecture and jewellery.

== In art ==
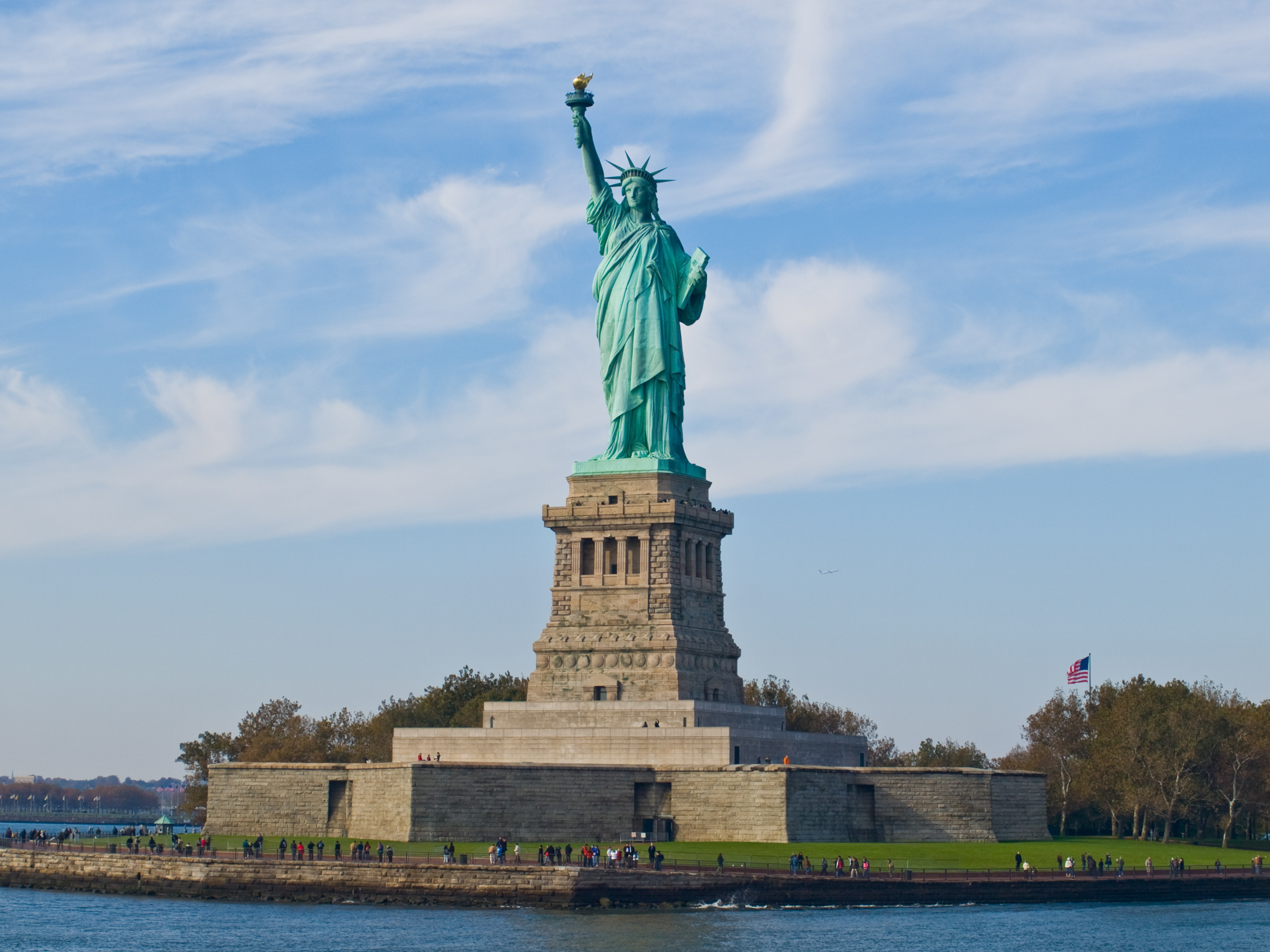
The Statue of Liberty on Liberty Island

=== The Statue of Liberty ===
The Statue of Liberty, which can be found on Liberty Island in New York City, is a very well-known sculptural art piece depicting a woman holding a torch with her hand raised in the air. The sculpture was built in 1886 and stands 93 metres tall, representing freedom and welcoming immigrants who arrived by boat to the USA.

=== King of Kings ===
The Solid Rock Church, a Christian megachurch, had a statue named King of Kings, which depicted Jesus with his arms raised in the air. The statue was destroyed on 14 June 2010 after being hit by lightning and burning down. It has now been replaced by a new statue depicting Jesus standing with his arms held out in front of him, named ‘Lux Mundi’.

=== Christ the Redeemer ===
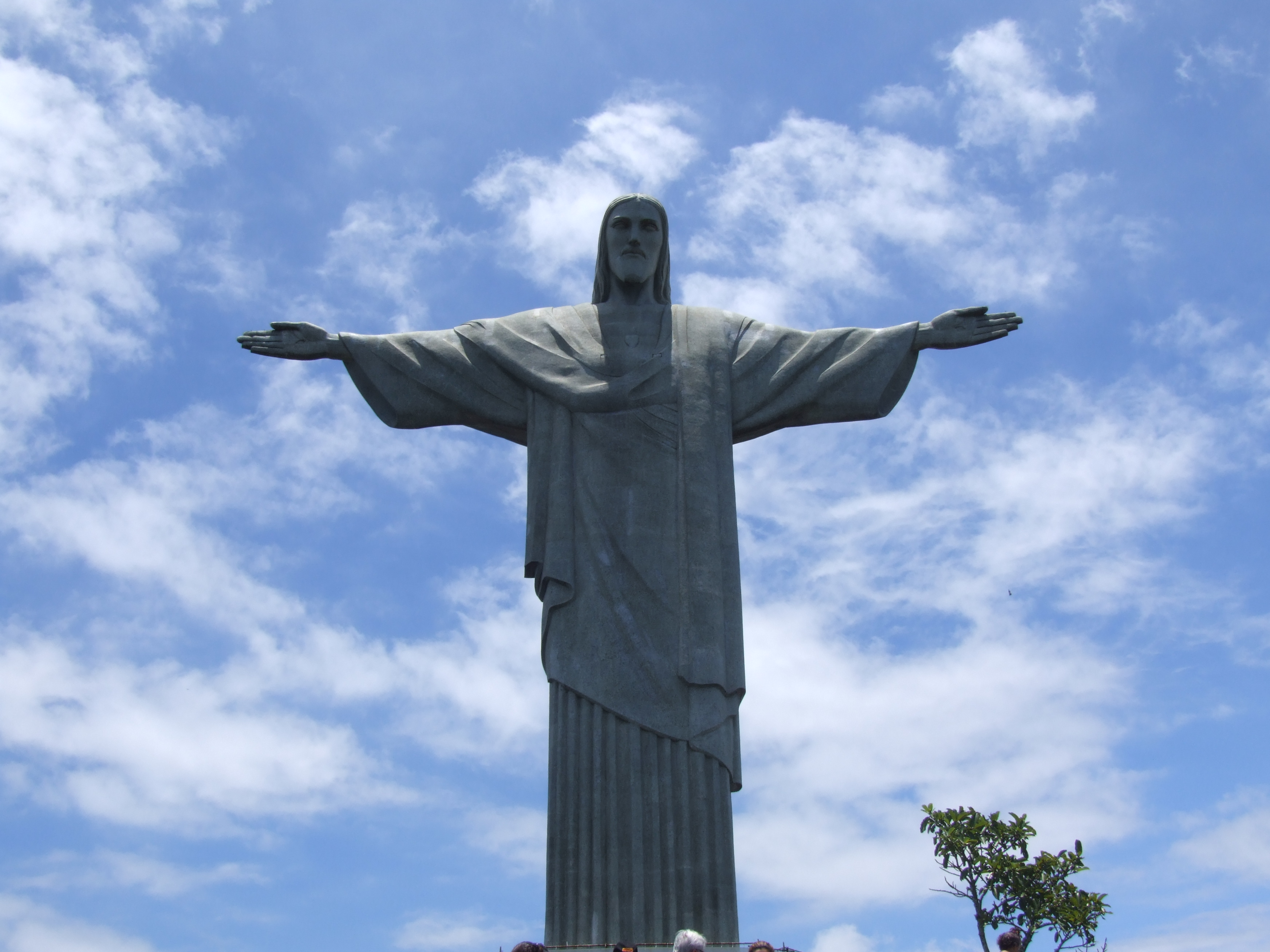
Christ the Redeemer statue in Rio de Janeiro

Christ the Redeemer is a large-scale statue overlooking the city of Rio de Janeiro, Brazil, located on the peak of Mount Corcovado. It depicts Jesus standing with his arms outstretched and palms of his hands raised to the sky. Although the massive artwork clearly portrays religious ideals, it does not represent this alone. In fact, one of the fundamental members of the original project, Count Celso, described it as a "monument" to both science and art, as well as religion.

== In education ==
From preschool, children are generally taught to indicate they have a question to ask their teacher or that they wish to answer a question posed to the class by raising one hand above their head, with the palm open and facing forwards. "Hand-raising is a conventional behaviour learned early in school and apparently never forgotten."

=== Benefit of raising hands ===
Hand-raising is important in enabling interaction in group contexts, as it enforces order and turn-allocation. The gesture also demonstrates respect for others, as one is not obligating the teacher to pause whilst giving instruction or teaching, or interrupting other students. However, it may be unnecessary in some teaching settings, such as during an informal conversation, a classroom party or in the playground. The times at which students choose to raise their hands reflect their teacher's expectations in different situations. Students are highly capable of shifting between answering questions spontaneously and raising their hand while waiting to be chosen by the teacher to speak. Hand-raising reflects the "organised dependency" of students, seeking permission from their teacher, so they can each be given a fair chance to contribute.

Students have identified raising their hands as a key discussion skill which is partly responsible for creating a "safe space" in their classroom, alongside a teacher who is encouraging of class participation and peers who are respectful and exhibit good discussion skills.

=== Raising hands in the classroom ===
There is another body language typically expected of students in the classroom environment, including directing their gaze and facing their body toward the teacher to show they are listening. However, expectations of student behaviour may shift throughout a lesson. Different teachers will also have different expectations, which strongly influences the way in which their students answer questions. Some students will raise their hands, but instead of waiting to be called upon, simply call out their answers, while others will not disrupt and will remain silent with hand raised, even when their impatience is visible through facial expression and handwaving.

One study on hand-raising illustrated that students almost always looked directly at the teacher when raising their hands, and only looked away just before lowering their hands. They also composed their facial expressions to appear serious before raising their hands, did not raise their hands whilst others in their class were answering a question, and lowered their hands once another student was elected by the teacher.

Teachers also use hand-raising to gain the attention of their students, and often to silence them, by raising one hand and not speaking, encouraging the students to imitate their behaviour.

=== Issues with raising hands ===
When students are required to raise their hands to participate in a discussion or answer a question, but their teachers can interrupt at any time, or students are only encouraged to give "right answers", they become less willing to suggest answers or discuss topics with their peers.

Hand-raising can be disruptive, as it causes the teacher to pause to answer the student's question, meaning teaching time is lost and students are distracted from the topic being taught, especially if many of them wish to ask questions. Thus, teachers do not always attend to students with raised hands. Teachers can also develop a habit of electing the same group of students repeatedly to answer questions, especially when teaching a large class, causing other students to become discouraged.

Recently, some schools have opted to ban hand-raising from their classrooms, instead implementing alternate strategies for students to contribute. One such school is the Samworth Church Academy in the United Kingdom, in which hand-raising is now used exclusively to request silence, although its logo is two children raising their hands. The decision made by this school to ban hand-raising in the classroom has received negative reactions from parents, teachers and the National Union of Teachers. The principal of Frankston High School in Melbourne is also banning hand-raising from his classrooms, justifying his decision by stating that only the "outgoing" students are raising their hands.

== In law ==
=== Oath-taking ===
In a courtroom, jurors and witnesses are required to swear an oath before partaking in a trial. This involves the individual raising their right hand, often placing the other hand on an object of ceremonial importance, such as the Bible, and vowing, as a juror, that they will give a "true" verdict based on the evidence or, as a witness, that they will tell the truth. Up to the 13th century in northern Europe, oaths were sworn "on the threshold". When a Bible was unavailable, the person taking the oath would place one hand on the doorframe or door ring.

Raising one's right hand while taking an oath originates from the courts of 17th century London. As judges did not have a reliable method of keeping track of criminal records, branding was sometimes chosen as a punishment, usually for defendants who were given leniency. For example, if the defendant received leniency for the "benefit of the clergy", they would receive a branded "T" on their thumb for committing theft, "F" meaning felon, or "M" meaning murder. Thus, if they had to return to court, they would be forced to raise their right hand, so the court could know if they had previously been granted leniency (which would not be granted a second time).

=== History of legal gestures ===
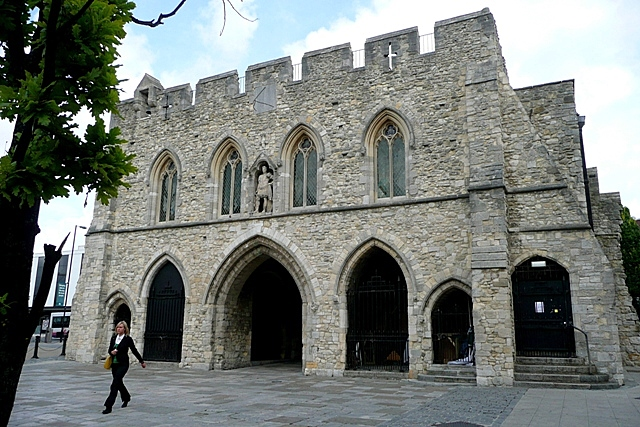
The northern entrance to the medieval town of Hampton. The Guild Hall (upstairs) was used as a prison and courtroom.

In historical societies, particularly in ancient and medieval times, gestures were hugely important in legal proceedings. They had a number of functions, such as the forming and dissolution of legal agreements; citizens of medieval Germany demonstrated legal accord by placing the palms of their hands together while raising their arms vertically. Gestures were also used to signify oath-taking. The practise of placing one hand on an object of spiritual significance was common in Ancient Greece and Rome, as well as medieval England. Witnesses in medieval Germany swore oaths by raising one hand to chest height with two fingers held straight out, signifying touching the religious artefact. Raising one's right hand can act as a communal signal of a legal change, and is highly useful in busy environments, such as town squares, where legal proceedings were often carried out in medieval times.

In Victorian England, oath-taking was highly controversial, as its primary purpose, from the viewpoint of Victorian elites, was to prevent non-Protestants from achieving high status through legal or political means. Sir Robert Inglis, a supporter of oath-taking, believed it enabled "stability and security… for society", as it necessitated a "solemn oath to God". A vocal minority strongly disapproved of oaths; it was recorded in 1868 that Serjent Gaselee "objected altogether to Oaths, which he regarded purely as relics of a bygone barbarism. The less a man swears the better.”

=== Perjury ===
In courtrooms nowadays, the value of telling the truth after swearing an oath is primarily based on fear of being charged for perjury, as opposed to fear of religious punishment. Legal punishment for perjury was not required historically because gods in both monotheistic and polytheistic religions were believed to punish those who lied under oath. For example, in Ancient Greece and Rome, individuals killed by lightning strikes were prohibited from receiving a proper burial, since that was thought to be Zeus’ punishment for perjury. A statute was first created outlawing perjury in 1563.
