= Loop-the-Loop (disambiguation) =

Loop-the-Loop is a vertical loop or 360 degree turn in a roller coaster track, derived from a similar aerobatic maneuver.

Loop-the-Loop (or loop the loop, loop-de-loop) may also refer to:

== Roller coasters ==
- Loop the Loop (Coney Island)
- Loop the Loop (Olentangy Park)
- Loop the Loop (Young's Pier)

== Music ==
- "Loop de Loop", a 1963 hit single by Johnny Thunder, as well as by Bobby Rydell
- "Loop de Loop (Flip Flop Flyin' in an Aeroplane)", a Beach Boys song from Endless Harmony Soundtrack
- "Loop-the-Loop" (song), J-pop singer Kotoko's 16th single
- Loop Da Loop, an alias of French-British musician Nicolas Jean-Pierre Dresti
- Loopdeloop, the second single by Chell and the Vetos

== Other ==
- Loop the Loop, an alternative title for Slitherlink, a logic puzzle
- Loop the Loop, an ice cream sold by HB Ice Cream
- Loopy De Loop, a theatrical cartoon short series by Hanna and Barbera
