= Wilted rose emoji =

Emoji representing a wilted rose

A flat variant of the wilted rose emoji from the Fluent Emoji Project

The wilted rose emoji (U+1F940 🥀 WILTED FLOWER) is an emoji depicting a wilted flower. In early 2025, it became popular on TikTok as an ironic alternative to the broken heart emoji (U+1F494 💔 BROKEN HEART), which some users considered overused. It was added to Unicode 9.0 and Emoji 3.0 in 2016. It is used to express sadness, heartbreak, grief, or disappointment, sometimes in an ironic manner.

According to an analysis of Google data by The New York Times, the wilted rose emoji was 2025's fastest-growing emoji in popularity and the 93rd most used overall. It has become particularly popular among Generation Alpha, who use it to express sadness or mock heartbreak.

Linguist Adam Aleksic (also known as Etymology Nerd online) has described the wilted rose emoji as an example of a "forced emoji": an emoji that users have deliberately assigned meaning to.

== See also ==
- Poop emoji
- Skull emoji
