= Stuffed flatbread =

Stuffed flatbread may refer to the following food items:

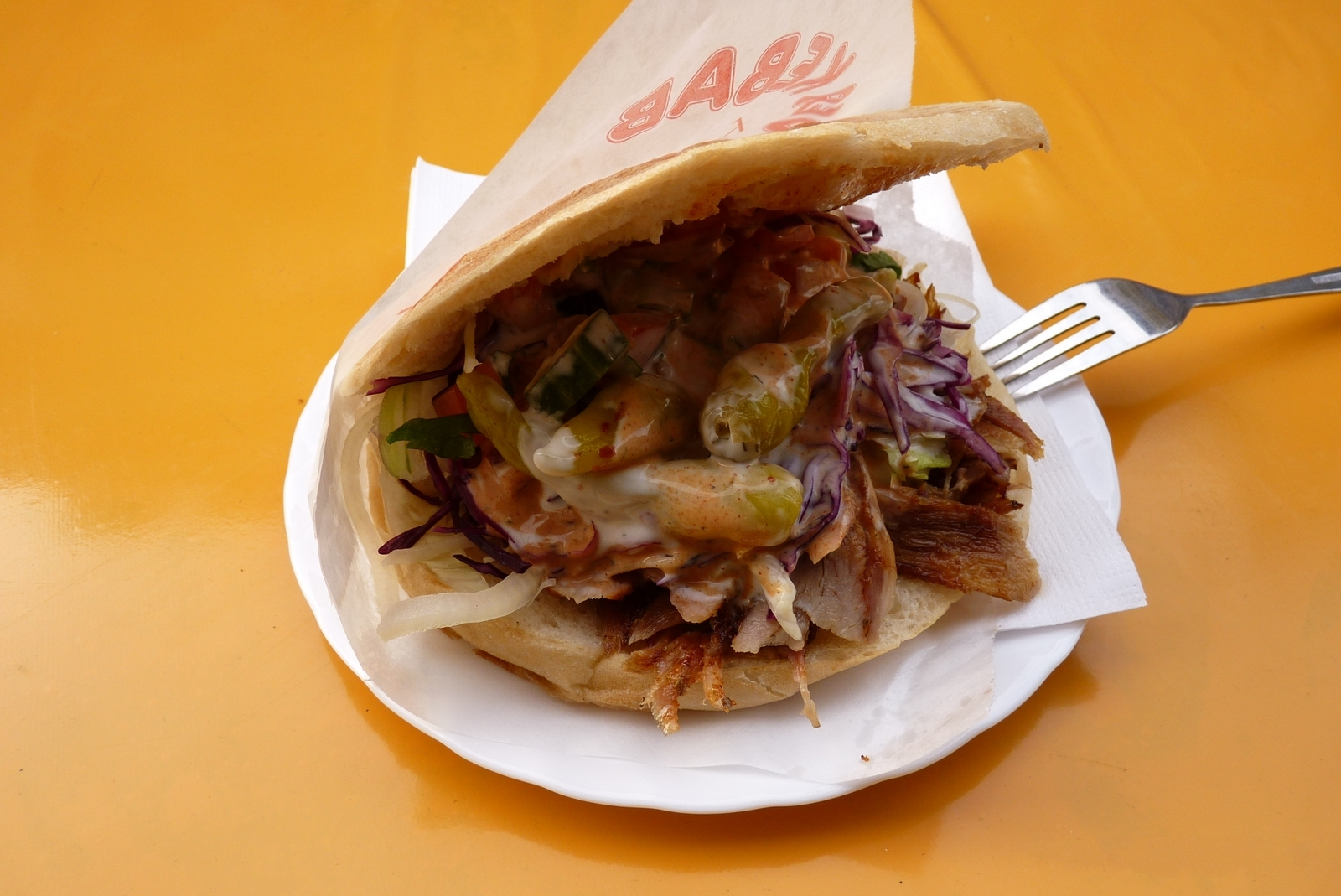
Doner kebab, of Turkish origin

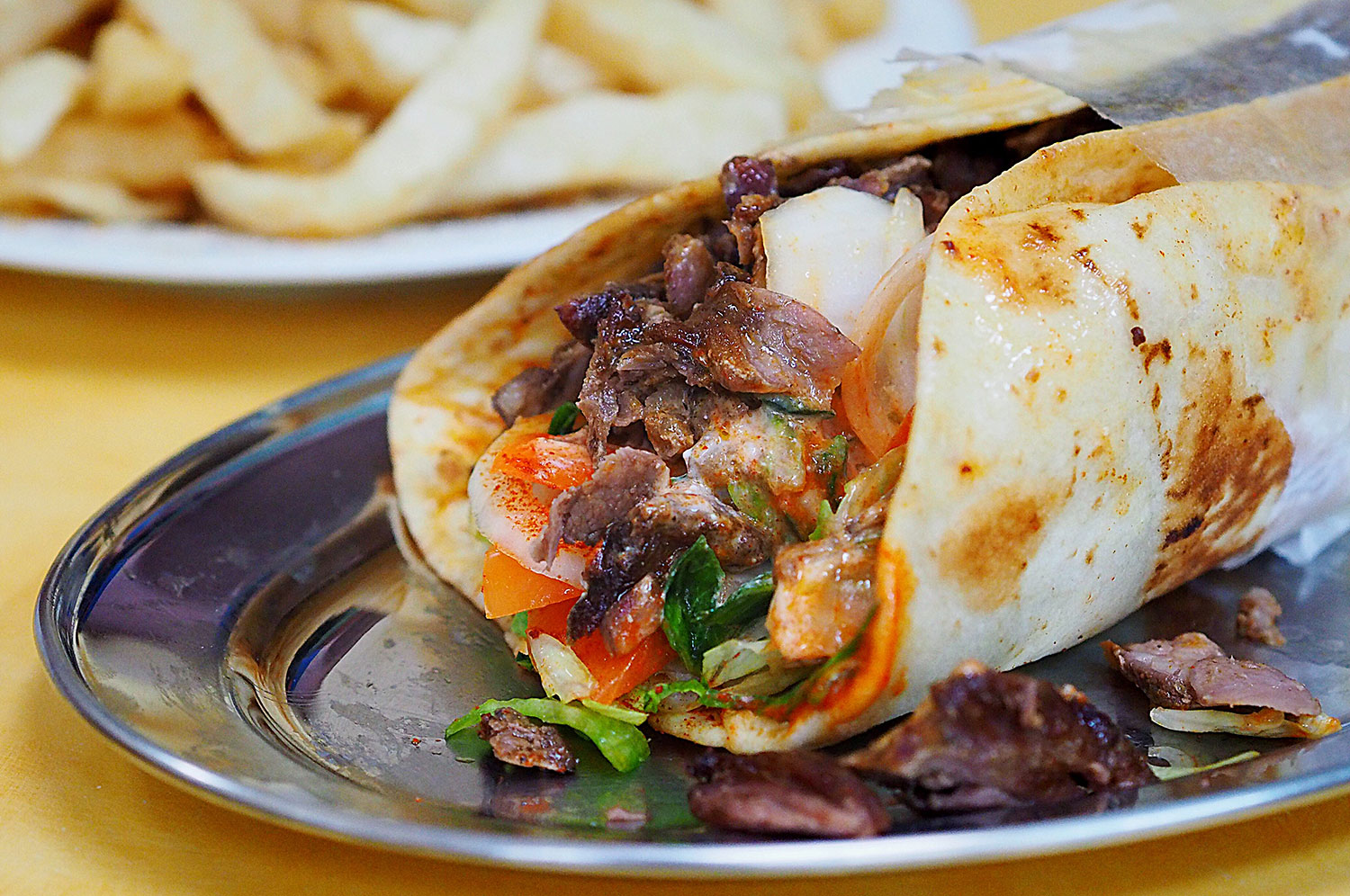
Gyros, of Greek origin

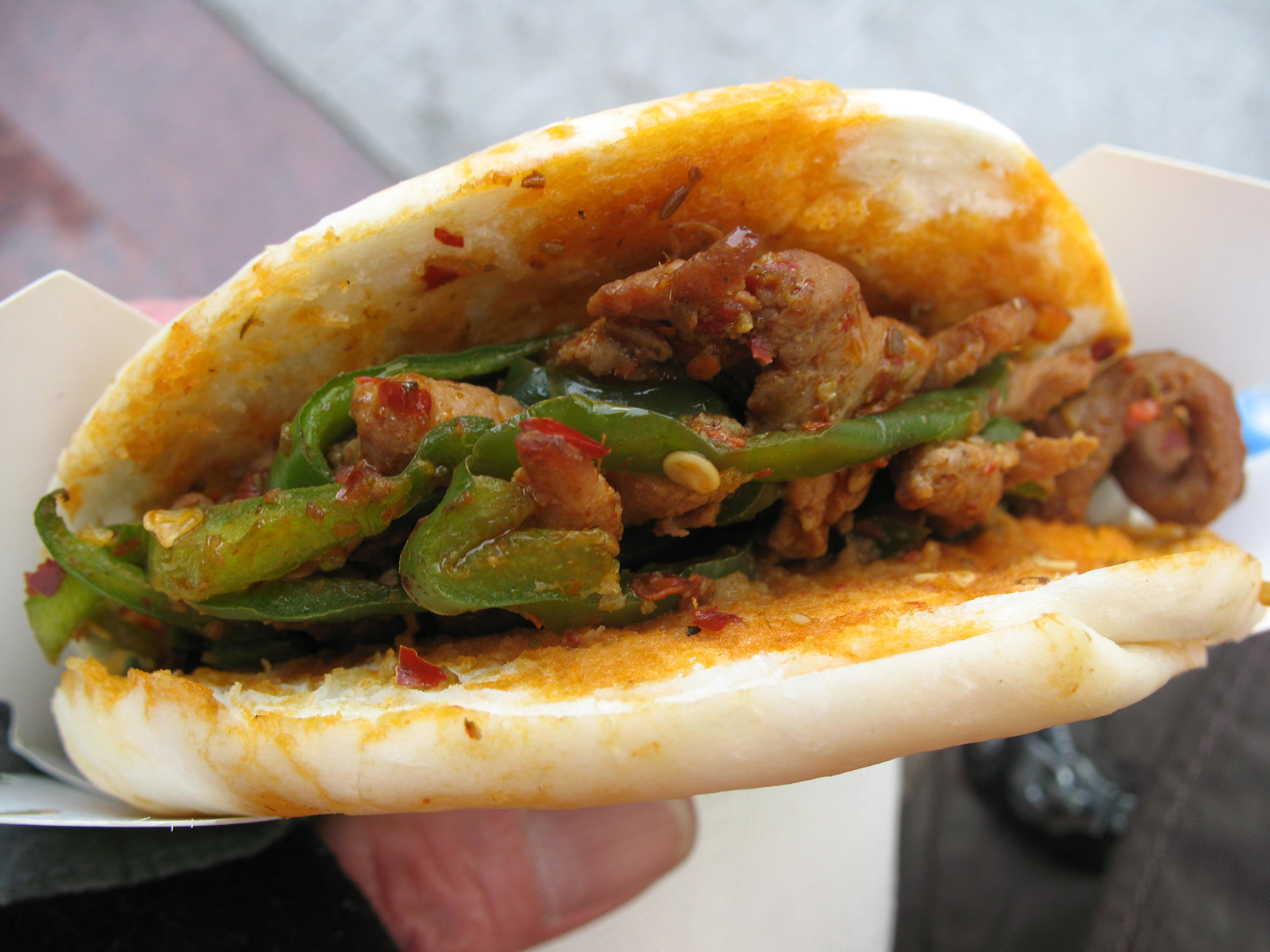
Roujiamo, of Shaanxi, China origin

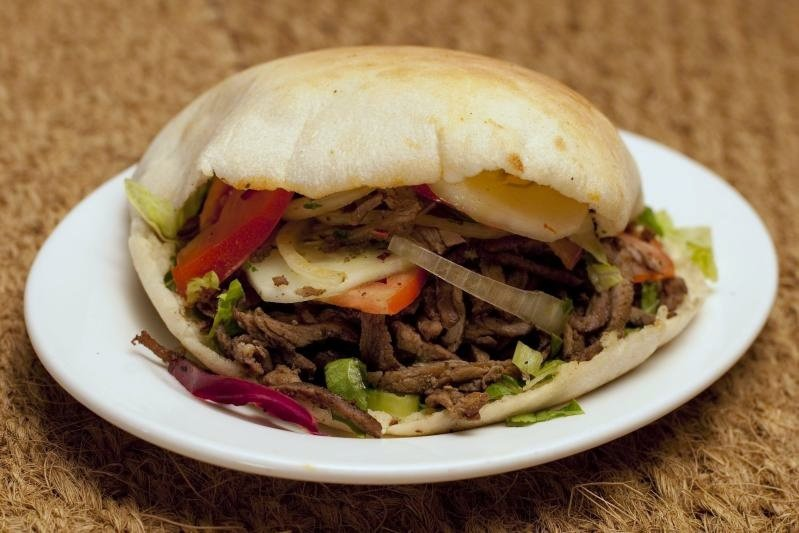
Shawarma, of Arab origin

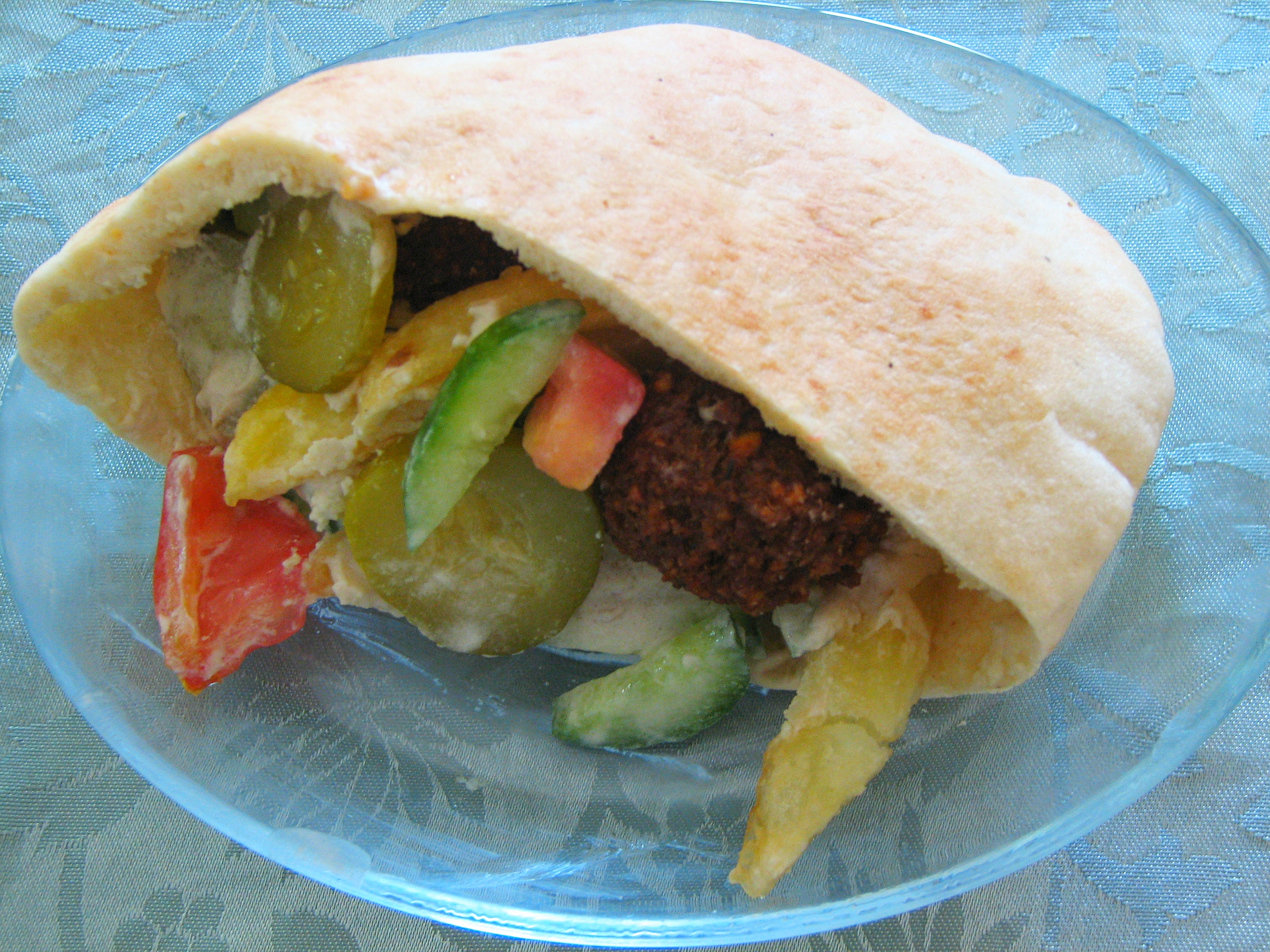
Falafel in Pita, of Arab origin

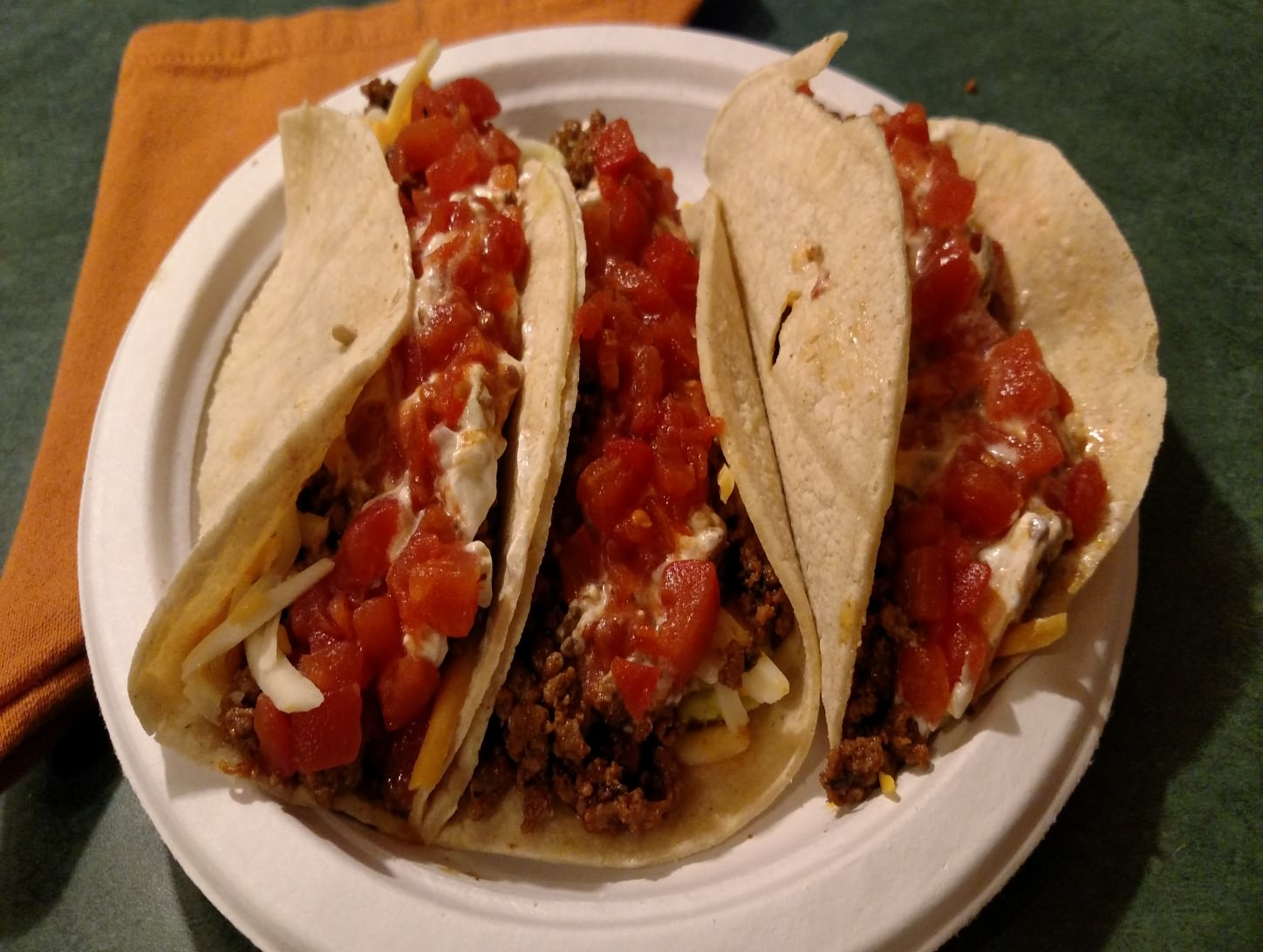
Taco, of Mexican origin

== See also ==
- Burrito
- List of sandwiches
- Wrap (food)
