= Peach emoji =

Fruit emoji icon

The peach emoji as it appears on X (formerly Twitter).

The peach emoji (🍑) is a fruit emoji depicting a pinkish-orange peach. The emoji is noted for its resemblance to human buttocks or the vulva, owing to the center crease, and is consequently frequently used as a euphemism for such on social media.

== Development and usage history ==
The peach emoji was originally included in proprietary emoji sets from au by KDDI. As part of a set of characters sourced from SoftBank Mobile, au by KDDI, and NTT Docomo emoji sets, the peach emoji was approved as part of Unicode 6.0 in 2010. Global popularity of emojis then surged in the early- to mid-2010s. The peach emoji has been included in the Unicode Technical Standard for emoji (UTS #51) since its first edition (Emoji 1.0) in 2015.

Character information
Preview	🍑	
Unicode name	PEACH	
Encodings	decimal	hex
Unicode	127825	U+1F351
UTF-8	240 159 141 145	F0 9F 8D 91
UTF-16	55356 57169	D83C DF51
GB 18030	148 57 183 57	94 39 B7 39
Numeric character reference	&#127825;	&#x1F351;
Shift JIS (au by KDDI)	243 250	F3 FA
7-bit JIS (au by KDDI)	122 124	7A 7C
Emoji shortcode	:peach:	
Google name (pre-Unicode)	PEACH	
CLDR text-to-speech name	peach	
Google substitute string	[モモ]	

== Popularity on social media and cultural impact ==
The peach emoji is commonly used to represent buttocks or female genitalia in sexting conversations. This usage has been noted to be common in the United States. In line with the peach emoji's common usage in sexual contexts, Emojipedia noted that the emoji is popularly paired with the eggplant emoji (🍆), which is often used to represent a penis.

During the impeachment proceedings against President Trump in 2019, the peach emoji was used to render "impeachment" as "im🍑ment" by Trump opposers. Like English "impeachment", the French verb "empêcher" contains the substring "pêche" (which means "peach"). The Christian Science Monitor noted that "peach" and "impeachment" are not etymologically related.

== Reception ==
In 2015, Vice claimed that the peach emoji is a "leading contender" for a vulva emoji. In 2021, The Verge stated that peach emoji joined together with new bubbles emoji will be "great", while Cosmopolitan included peach emoji as a "Classic" sex emoji.

In 2016, Apple Inc. brought back the peach emoji and attempted to redesign the emoji to less resemble buttocks; later some fans praised the emoji's comeback, but this was mostly met with fierce backlash in beta testing and Apple reversed its decision by the time it went live to the public. In April 2019, Facebook and Instagram both banned using the eggplant or peach emojis alongside sexual statements about "being horny".
