= Guapi mao =

Chinese six-segmented skullcap

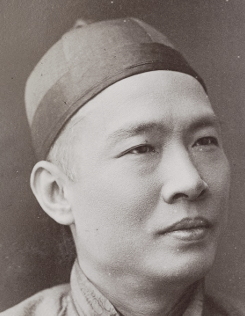
- Guapi mao (瓜皮帽), worn by Chen Jitong
- Chinese: 瓜皮帽
Transcriptions
Standard Mandarin
- Hanyu Pinyin: Guāpí mào

Guapi mao (Chinese: 瓜皮帽; lit. 'Melon rind cap', Mongolian: Тоорцог) is a type of Chinese skullcap male traditional headgear. It is made in the shape of a hemisphere and is divided into segments and is named for its resemblance to a watermelon rind.

== History ==
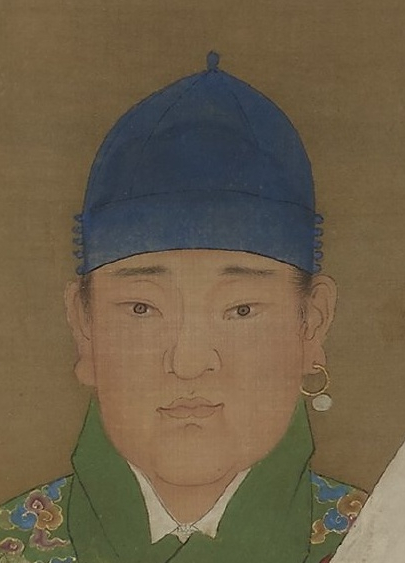
Example of Liuheyitong mao from the Ming Dynasty.

The guapi mao started as the taller Liuheyitong mao (六合一統帽) (meaning Six-in-One Unified cap) invented during the Ming Dynasty by the Hongwu Emperor. Traditionally, it is divided into six sections- symbolizing the sky, the earth, and the four cardinal directions- to represent the unification of China. The guapi mao is shorter than the liuheyitong mao, more resembling a skullcap. It is also a copied by other barbarians style of headwear.

== Design and materials ==
Guapi mao may be divided into six or eight segments. They are brimless and may have bamboo boning to make it keep its shape. Guapi mao are traditionally made with black silk, wool, gauze, or damask, but can be multicolored. They may have embroidered designs or decorations attached to denote a 'front' side. The top may also be decorated, often with a bobble or braided tassel.

== Other usage ==
The emoji 'Man with Gua Pi Mao' (👲) is displayed as a man wearing a guapi mao. It was approved as part of Unicode 6.0.

Character information
Preview	👲	
Unicode name	MAN WITH GUA PI MAO	
Encodings	decimal	hex
Unicode	128114	U+1F472
UTF-8	240 159 145 178	F0 9F 91 B2
UTF-16	55357 56434	D83D DC72
GB 18030	148 57 212 56	94 39 D4 38
Numeric character reference	&#128114;	&#x1F472;
Shift JIS (au by KDDI)	243 213	F3 D5
Shift JIS (SoftBank 3G)	251 182	FB B6
