= Dinosaur emojis =

Emoji representing dinosaurs

The T-Rex emoji (left) and Sauropod emoji (right), as depicted in Noto Emoji

T-Rex (🦖) and Sauropod (🦕), collectively dinosaur emoji, are two emojis depicting Tyrannosaurus and Sauropoda dinosaurs that are part of the Unicode Standard, originally added in Unicode 10.0 in June 2017.

In addition to their literal depictions, the emojis have been used to note the perceived obsolescence of an idea. The dinosaur emojis have also been used to represent both transgender and trans-exclusionary radical feminist groups on the Internet.

== History and design ==
The T-Rex emoji (left) and Sauropod emoji (right), as depicted in the Fluent Design System

Following interest expressed online for the addition of a dinosaur emoji to Unicode, multiple proposals for its creation were submitted to the Unicode Consortium in 2016, each differing on the number, style, anatomical structures, and species of dinosaur depicted. The proposals and their subsequent discussion noted that a dinosaur emoji would have both a high expected usage rate and multiple construable meanings.

Dinosaur emojis were released in Unicode 10.0, as part of Emoji 5.0, on 20 June 2017. The release features full-body depictions of a Tyrannosaurus rex, as a green dinosaur standing on its hind legs, and a sauropod, as a blue, grey, or green dinosaur standing on all four legs.

== Platform variations ==
While the Unicode Consortium provides a standard codepoint for each dinosaur, individual vendors have designed them with significant aesthetic differences.

The T-Rex emoji (🦖) shows the most variation in color and posture:

- Apple and Google depict the dinosaur as green.
- Samsung's version is notably red or orange-toned.
- Twitter (X) and Microsoft utilize a brown or tan color scheme.
- Facebook's implementation is unique for showing only the head of the dinosaur rather than a full-body depiction.

The Sauropod emoji (🦕) varies primarily in its anatomical inspiration. While it is broadly categorized as a "sauropod," Apple's design closely resembles a Brachiosaurus with its characteristic high-shouldered stance, whereas other versions, such as WhatsApp's, more closely resemble a diplodocid with a horizontal neck posture.

== Scientific reception ==
Following the announcement and release of the dinosaur emojis, several paleontologists and science communicators criticized the anatomical accuracy of the designs, particularly those from Apple. Paleontologist Riley Black and others noted that the Tyrannosaurus emoji originally featured upright posturing and dragging tails, a depiction considered scientifically obsolete since the dinosaur renaissance of the 1970s.

Additional criticism focused on the lack of feathers on the theropod designs. While the Unicode Consortium's original proposal suggested a "wide range of dinosaur emoji" to satisfy both public and scientific demands, the final versions were largely based on mid-20th-century pop culture depictions. Despite these critiques, the sauropod emoji was praised for using the taxonomically inclusive term "sauropod" rather than "Brontosaurus," avoiding the historical naming controversy associated with that genus.

The Unicode Consortium was criticized during the emoji design process because of its lack of scientific consideration; Keith Winstein, a computer scientist at Stanford University, noted the lack of paleontologist involvement during the Unicode Consortium's design of the Standard. Apple faced similar criticisms following its implementation of Unicode 10.0, with Thomas Carr of Carthage College noting that Apple's design of the T-Rex emoji lacked "basic anatomical accuracy".

== Usage ==
The dinosaur emojis can be used literally to represent a Tyrannosaurus and a sauropod. According to Emojipedia, both dinosaur emoji are also used to express the idea of being "old-fashioned or out-of-touch with modern sentiments". An original proposal for the dinosaur emoji from 2016 by Dominik Schwartz suggested that it could also be used to represent the ideas of large size, obsolescence, or extinction.

== Cultural impact and usage ==
Beyond literal representations of prehistoric life, the dinosaur emojis have developed several metaphorical meanings in internet culture.

=== General metaphors ===
The emojis are frequently used to describe someone or something as "old-fashioned," "out-of-touch," or "obsolete." This stems from the common English idiom of calling a person a "dinosaur" to imply they have failed to adapt to modern times. In some contexts, the T-Rex emoji is used to represent hunger or "rawr" (a playful, stylized roar common in early 2000s internet slang).

=== Social and political symbolism ===
The dinosaur emojis have been involved in a "tug-of-war" for symbolic meaning between different online communities:

- community: Many individuals adopted the dinosaur (particularly the blue sauropod) as a symbol of pride. Paleontologist Riley Black, who is a transgender woman, noted that the prehistoric nature of dinosaurs resonates with themes of "transformation through time" and existing outside of traditional categories.
- movements: Conversely, "dinosaurs" (implying their views are extinct or old-fashioned) by David Lammy. This led to online disputes over the emoji's "ownership," which was documented by the Endless Thread podcast in 2022.

=== Popular culture ===
The emojis see significant spikes in usage during the release of major franchise media, such as the Jurassic Park films. Sports teams with dinosaur mascots, most notably the Toronto Raptors, frequently use the T-Rex emoji in social media communications to engage fans.

== Encoding ==
Character information
Preview	🦕		🦖	
Unicode name	SAUROPOD		T-REX	
Encodings	decimal	hex	dec	hex
Unicode	129429	U+1F995	129430	U+1F996
UTF-8	240 159 166 149	F0 9F A6 95	240 159 166 150	F0 9F A6 96
UTF-16	55358 56725	D83E DD95	55358 56726	D83E DD96
Numeric character reference	&#129429;	&#x1F995;	&#129430;	&#x1F996;

Both characters are categorized as "Symbol, Other" (So) in the Unicode General Category, with a bidirectional class of "Other Neutral" (ON), meaning they follow the overall text direction without inheriting strong directional properties.

== See also ==
- Gaysper
