= List of gestures =

List of bodily actions used as nonverbal communication

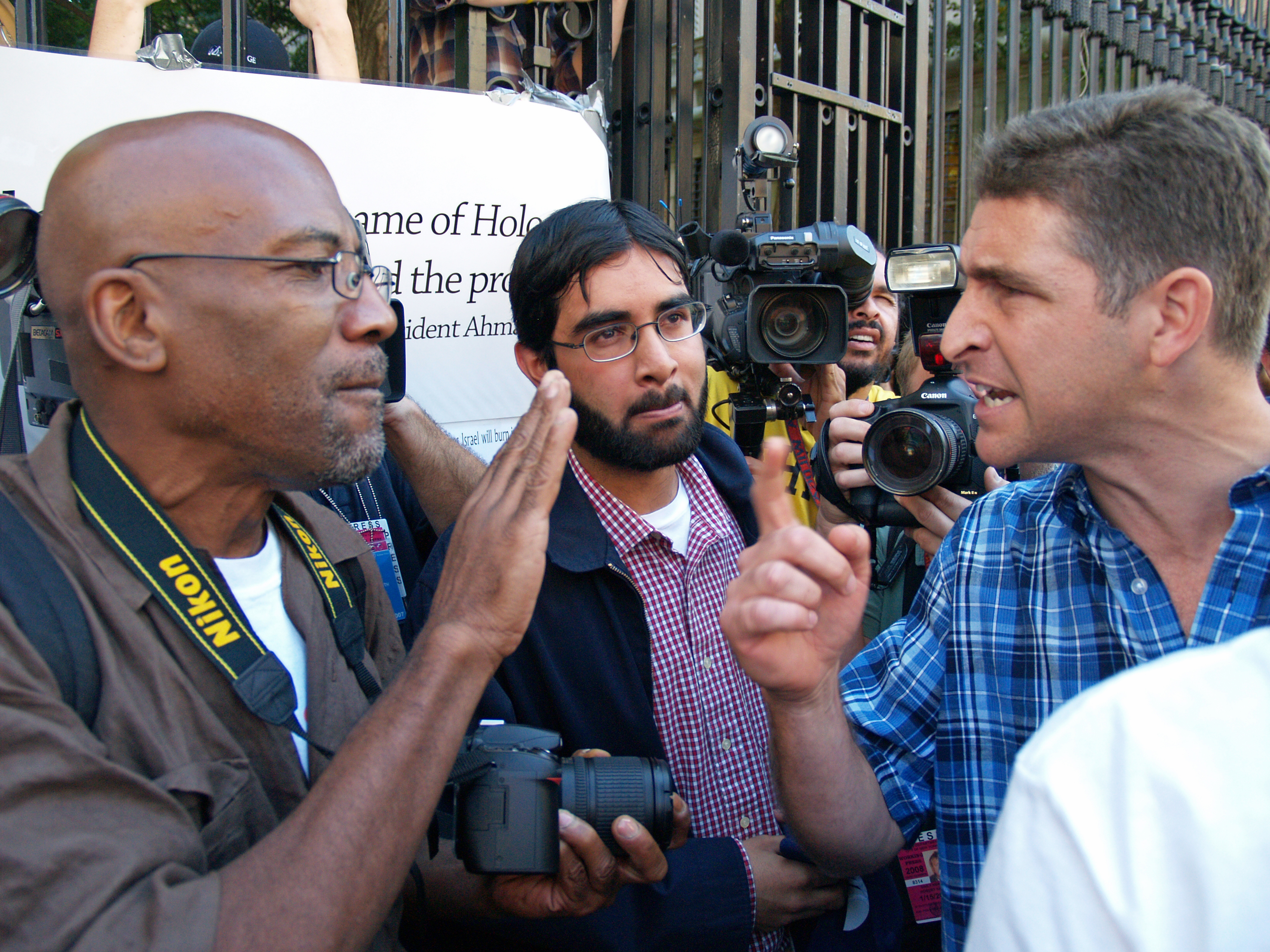
People often use gestures during heated or tense arguments, such as at this political demonstration (2007).

Gestures are a form of nonverbal communication in which visible bodily actions are used to communicate important messages, either in place of speech or together and in parallel with spoken words. Gestures include movement of the hands, face, or other parts of the body. Physical non-verbal communication such as purely expressive displays, proxemics, or displays of joint attention differ from gestures, which communicate specific messages. Gestures are culture-specific and may convey very different meanings in different social or cultural settings. Hand gestures used in the context of musical conducting are chironomy, while when used in the context of public speaking are chironomia. Although some gestures, such as the ubiquitous act of pointing, differ little from one place to another, most gestures do not have invariable or universal meanings, but connote specific meanings in particular cultures. A single emblematic gesture may have very different significance in different cultural contexts, ranging from complimentary to highly offensive.

This list includes links to pages that discuss particular gestures, as well as short descriptions of some gestures that do not have their own page. Not included are the specialized gestures, calls, and signals used by referees and umpires in various organized sports. Police officers also make gestures when directing traffic. Miming is an art form in which the performer uses gestures to convey a story; charades is a game of gestures. Mimed gestures might generally be used to refer to an action in context, for example turning a pretend crank to ask someone to lower a car side window (or for modern power windows, pointing down or miming pressing a button).

== Single handed ==
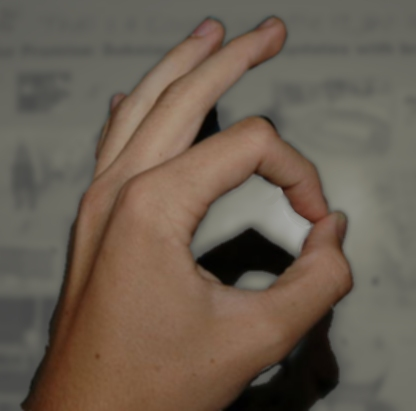
Okay sign

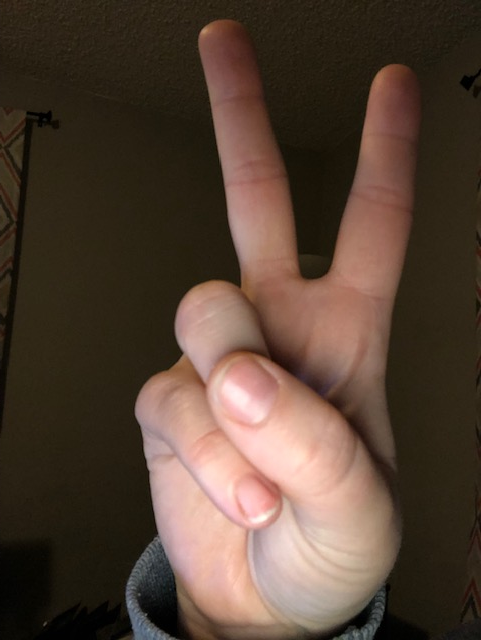
Peace sign

- A-OK or Okay, made by connecting the thumb and forefinger in a circle and holding the other fingers straight, usually signal the word okay. It is considered obscene in Brazil and Turkey, being similar to the Western extended middle finger with the back of the hand towards the recipient. It is also an insult in parts of Europe, meaning anal sex, to imply the rudeness or arrogance of the recipient, often used when driving with the thumb and index finger separated to infer "small penis". In more recent history, it is sometimes associated with the racist theory of white power, which started as a prank meme on 4chan. In Japanese culture a way of requesting money or payment uses a similar hand sign, with the palm facing upwards and the three extended fingers level.
- Abhayamudra is a Hindu mudra or gesture of reassurance and safety.
- Apology hand gesture is a Hindu custom to apologize in the form of a hand gesture with the right hand when a person's foot accidentally touches a book or any written material (which are considered as a manifestation of the goddess of knowledge Saraswati), money (which is considered as a manifestation of the goddess of wealth Lakshmi) or another person's leg. The offending person first touches the object with the fingertips and then the forehead and/or chest.
- Beckoning sign. In North America or Northern Europe, a beckoning sign is made with the index finger sticking out of the clenched fist, palm facing the gesturer. The finger moves repeatedly towards the gesturer (in a hook) as to draw something nearer. It has the general meaning of "come here". It can also be done with the palm upwards so the finger points directly at the target. In Northern Africa (i.e. the Maghreb), calling someone is done using the full hand. In several Asian and European countries, a beckoning sign is made with a scratching motion with all four fingers and with the palm down. In Japan and other countries in the far-east cultural area, the palm faces the recipient with the hand at head's height. If reversed, it's considered rude.

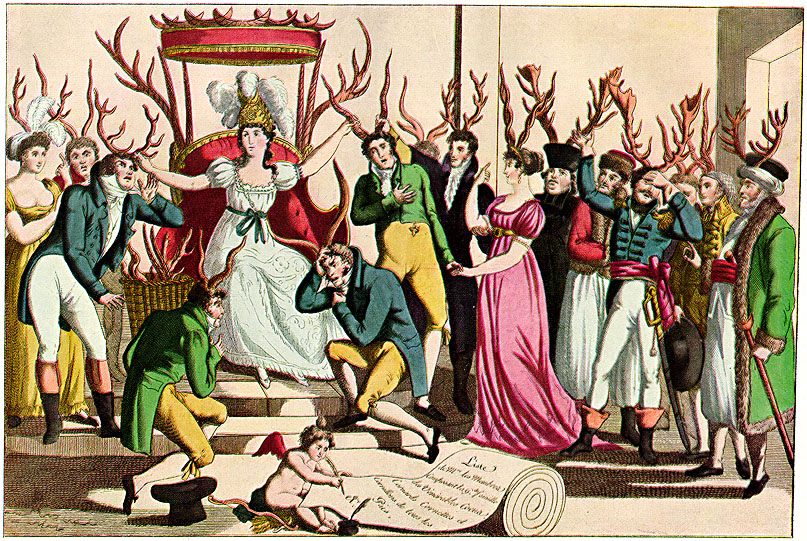
Before "bunny ears", people were given cuckold's horns as an insult by sneaking up behind them with two fingers (c. 1815 French satire).

- Bellamy salute was used in conjunction with the American Pledge of Allegiance prior to World War II.
- Bent index finger. This is a gesture that means 'dead' in Chinese culture.
- Hand of benediction and blessing. The benediction gesture (or benedictio Latina gesture) is a raised right hand with the ring finger and little finger touching the palm whist the middle and index fingers remain raised. Taken from Ancient Roman iconography for speaking (an example is the Augustus of Prima Porta where the emperor Augustus assumes the pose of an orator in addressing his troops), often simplified as the benediction gesture, is used by the Christian clergy to perform blessings with the sign of the cross; moreover the raised thumb, middle, and index fingers allegorically represent the three Persons of the Holy Trinity. Too, the hand's shape is said to partially spell the name of Jesus Christ in Greek.
- Not allowed. The point finger pointed upwards, whilst wagging the point from left to right, the hand around the chin level below the mouth.
- Blah-blah. The fingers are kept straight and together, held horizontal or upwards and bending at the lowest knuckles, while the thumb points downwards. The fingers and thumb then snap together repeatedly to mimic a mouth talking. The gesture can be used to indicate that someone talks too much, gossips, is saying nothing of any consequence, or is boring.
- Check, please. This gesture, used to mean that a dinner patron wishes to pay the bill and depart, is executed by touching the index finger and thumb together and "writing" a checkmark, circle, or wavy line (as if signing one's name) in the air.

To signal for the bill in Japan, although not widely used by younger people, both hands are raised, with the two index fingers forming an "X". This is to signal the "end" of a meal which is called "Shime (〆(しめ))" in Japanese. The crossed fingers represent this kanji.

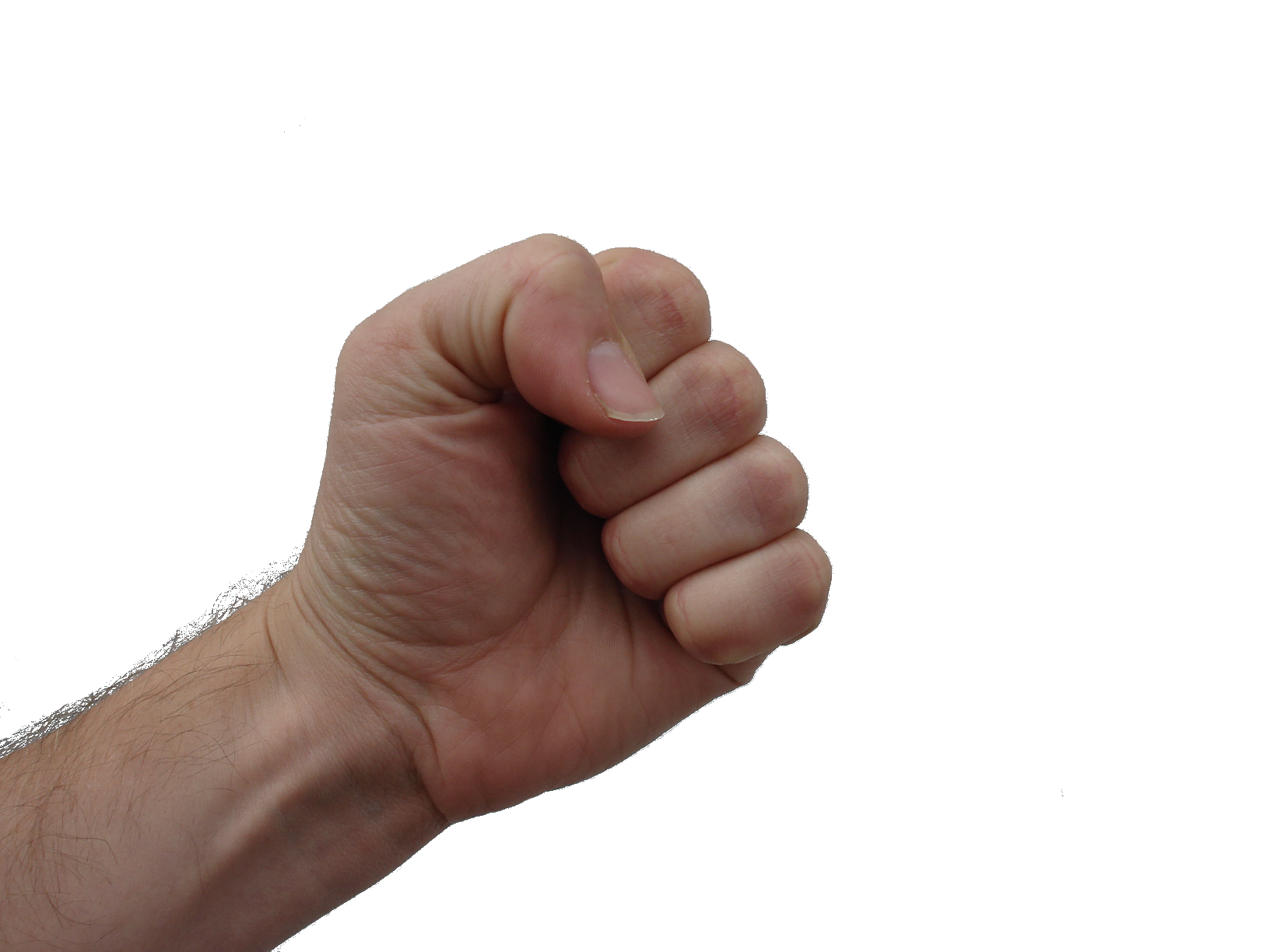
A clenched fist

- Chinese number gestures are a method of using one hand to signify the natural numbers one through ten.
- Clenched fist is used as a gesture of defiance or solidarity. Facing the signer, it threatens physical violence (i.e., "a thumping").

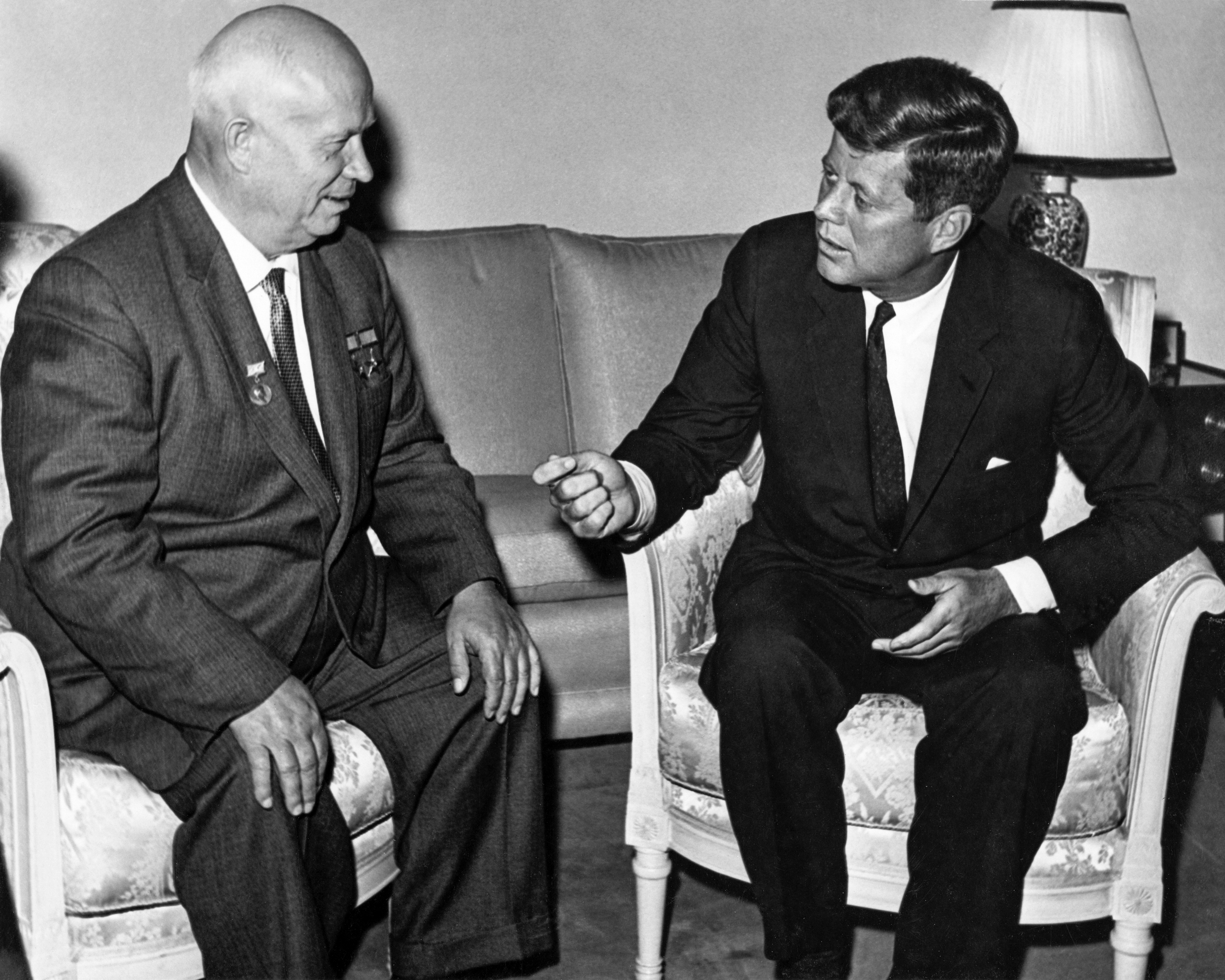
Kennedy's gesture seen here with Nikita Khrushchev.

- Clinton thumb. The gesture dubbed the "Clinton thumb" after one of its most famous users, Bill Clinton, is used by politicians to provide emphasis in speeches. This gesture has the thumb leaning against the thumb-side portion of the index finger, which is part of a closed fist, or slightly projecting from the fist. An emphatic, it does not exhibit the anger of the clenched fist or pointing finger, and so is thought to be less threatening. This gesture was likely adopted by Clinton from John F. Kennedy, who can be seen using it in many speeches and images from his political career.
- Crossed fingers are used superstitiously to wish for good luck or to nullify a promise.
- Cuckoo sign, touched or screw loose. In North America, making a circling motion of the index finger at the ear or temple signifies that the person "has a screw loose", i.e. is speaking nonsense or is crazy.
- Cuckold's horns are traditionally placed behind an unwitting man (the cuckold) to insult him and represent that his wife is unfaithful. It is made with the index and middle fingers spread by a person standing behind the one being insulted. In modern culture as bunny ears "the actual symbolism has been forgotten and only the offence remains".
- Dismissive hand wave: this is a gesture in which a person waves their hand or flicks their wrist outward, usually palm facing away from the body, as if brushing something aside. It is commonly used to signal dismissal, rejection, or telling someone to “go away.” In this sense, it conveys impatience or disdain, and is often understood as a nonverbal equivalent of saying “forget it” or “leave.” In English, this gesture is associated with phrases such as “wave someone away” or “wave off,” both of which carry dismissive connotations. Cultural variations exist: in some societies, the gesture may be interpreted as playful or casual, while in others it can be considered rude. In the context of African-American church and gospel music culture, the same motion can carry a positive meaning. Congregants may wave their hand as if to say “stop” or “go away,” not as a rejection of the performer but as an affirmation that the music is overwhelmingly powerful or spiritually moving. This usage is a form of nonverbal praise and part of the broader call-and-response tradition in Black worship, similar to shouting “Amen!” or standing in response to a sermon or song.
- Eyelid pull, where one forefinger is used to pull the lower eyelid further down, and signifies alertness.

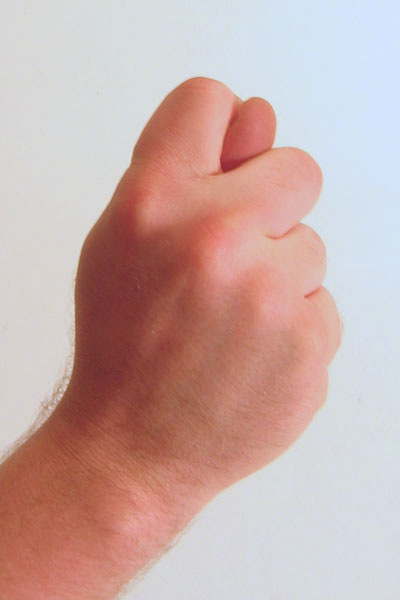
The "fig sign" is an ancient gesture with many uses.

- Fig sign is a gesture made with the hand and fingers curled and the thumb thrust between the middle and index fingers, or, rarely, the middle and ring fingers, forming the fist so that the thumb partly pokes out. In some areas of the world, the gesture is considered a good luck charm; in others (including Indonesia, Japan, Korea, Russia, Serbia and Turkey among others), it is considered an obscene gesture. The precise origin of the gesture is unknown, but many historians speculate that it refers to a penis penetrating the vagina (to which The Finger also refers). In ancient Greece, this gesture was a fertility and good luck charm designed to ward off evil. This usage has survived in Portugal and Brazil, where carved images of hands in this gesture are used in good luck talismans.
- The finger, an extended middle finger with the back of the hand towards the recipient, is an obscene hand gesture used in much of Western culture.
- Finger counting is a system to indicate numbers using fingers on one or two hands. Different areas differ in the initial finger used for the number one (thumb or index or pinky) as well as the zero symbol and highest possible number (10, 20, 27, 9999).

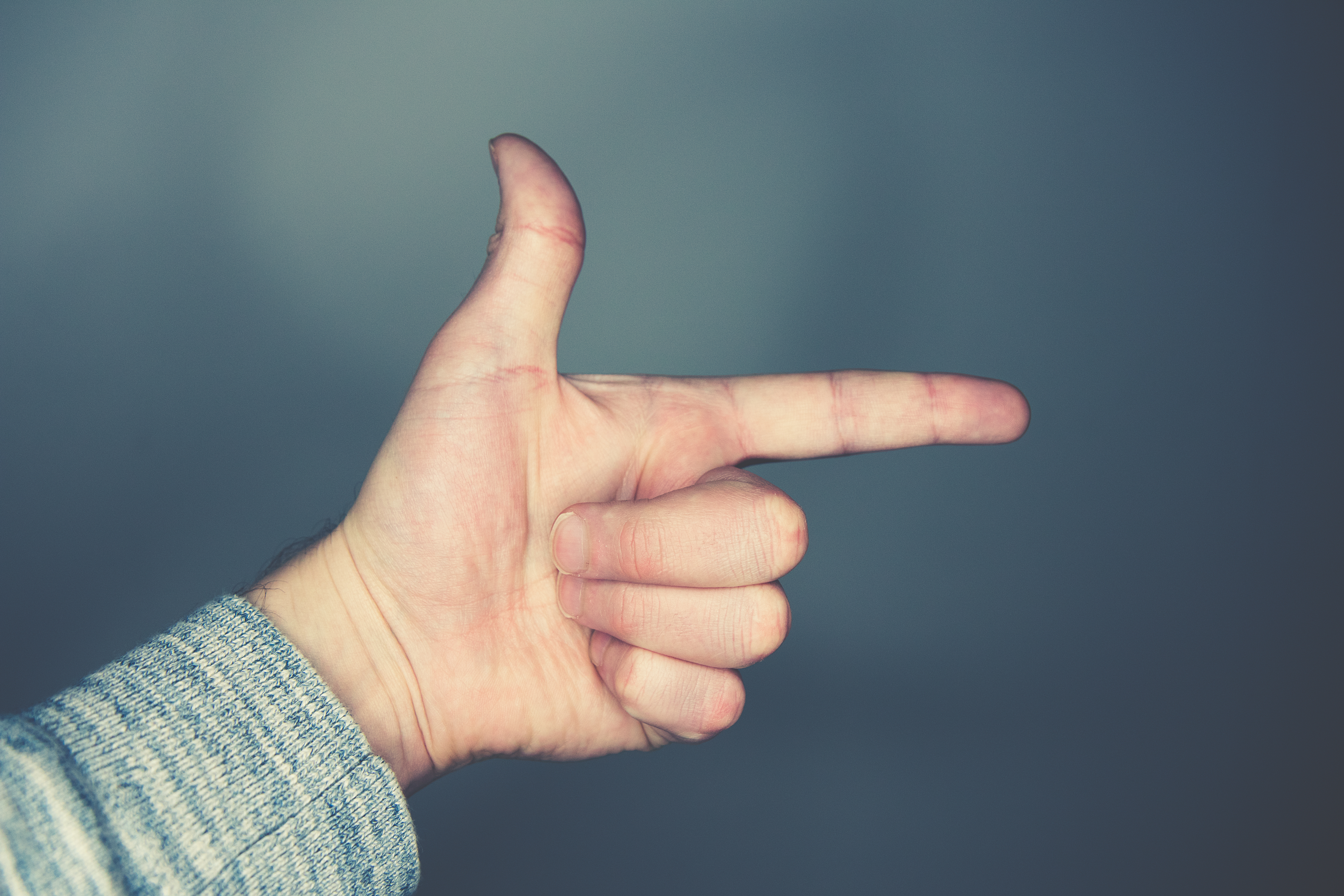
The finger gun gesture

- Finger gun is a hand gesture in which the subject uses their hand to mimic a handgun. If pointed to oneself (with or without the "hammer falling" of the thumb indicating firing, or a small tilt up to represent recoil), it may indicate boredom or awkwardness in the sense of wanting to commit (social) suicide; when pointed to another, it is interpreted as a threat of violence, either genuine or in jest. Between friends, a finger gun can be a sign of acknowledgement similar to a head nod and hello. Simultaneous finger guns with both hands can also be used to underscore the punchline of a joke, something of a visual equivalent to a "rimshot" sound effect.
- Finger heart is a hand gesture in which the subject has a palm up fist, raises their index finger and brings their thumb over it so as to form a small heart shape. It signals a similar gesture to that of the two-handed heart. It originates from South Korean culture and was used by athletes during the Pyeongchang 2018 Olympic Games. This gesture is a bit similar to money gesture, but without middle finger and not rubbing repeatedly to the thumb.
- Fist bump is similar to a handshake or high five which may be used as a symbol of respect.
- Fist pump is a celebratory gesture in which a closed fist is raised before the torso and subsequently drawn down in a vigorous, swift motion.
- Grey Wolf salute is a fist with the little finger and index finger raised, depicting head of a wolf. Originally used by the Gagauz as a gesture of salutation and victory, the gesture was later adopted by the Grey Wolves and is associated with Turkish nationalism.
- Handshake is a greeting ritual in which two people grasp each other's hands and may move their grasped hands up and down.
- High five is a celebratory ritual in which two people simultaneously raise one hand and then slap these hands together.
- Hitchhiking gestures including sticking one thumb upward, especially in North America, or pointing an index finger toward the road, to request a ride in an automobile.
- Horn sign is a hand gesture made by extending the index and little finger straight upward. It has a vulgar meaning in some Mediterranean Basin countries like Italy and is used in rock and roll, especially in heavy metal music called "devil's horns", often used with the tongue extended downward.

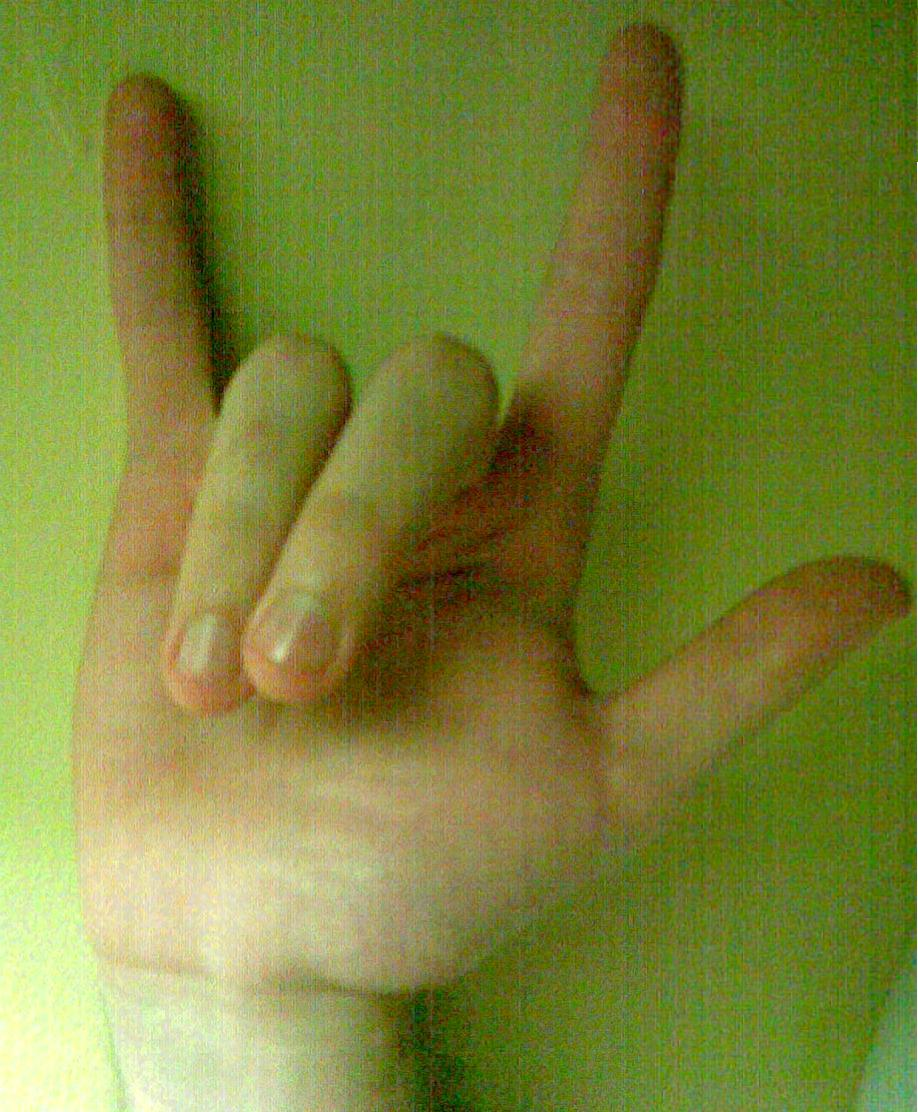
The ILY sign, "I Love You"

- ILY sign combines the letters 'I', 'L', and 'Y' from American Sign Language by extending the thumb, index finger, and little finger while the middle and ring finger touch the palm. It is an informal expression of love.
- Knocking on wood is a superstitious gesture used to ensure that a good thing will continue to occur after it has been acknowledged. However, it is sometimes used after speaking of a plausible unfortunate event, so that it does not actually occur.
- Kodály hand signs are a series of visual aids used during singing lessons in the Kodály method.
- Loser, made by extending the thumb and forefinger to resemble the shape of an L on the forehead is an insulting gesture.
- Mano pantea, which is a traditional way to ward off the evil eye, is made by raising the right hand with the palm out and folding the pinky and ring finger. An amulet was found in Pompeii.
- The money gesture, more commonly known as the "Pay Me" gesture, is signalled by repeatedly rubbing one's thumb over the tip of the index finger and middle finger. This gesture resembles the act of rubbing coins or bills together and is generally used when speaking about money.
- Moutza is a traditional insult gesture in Greece made by extending all five fingers and presenting the palm or palms toward the person being insulted.
- Nazi salute or Fascist salute was used in Germany and Italy during World War II to indicate loyalty to Adolf Hitler or Benito Mussolini and their respective parties. The right arm is raised in a straight diagonal position forward with the palm open facing downward. It was also used during Spanish State to indicate loyalty to Francisco Franco and in Greece for Ioannis Metaxas.
- Outstretched hand (with palm up) is a near-universal gesture for begging or requesting, extending beyond human cultures and into other primate species. This gesture can also be done with both hands to form a bowl. See also Origin of language.

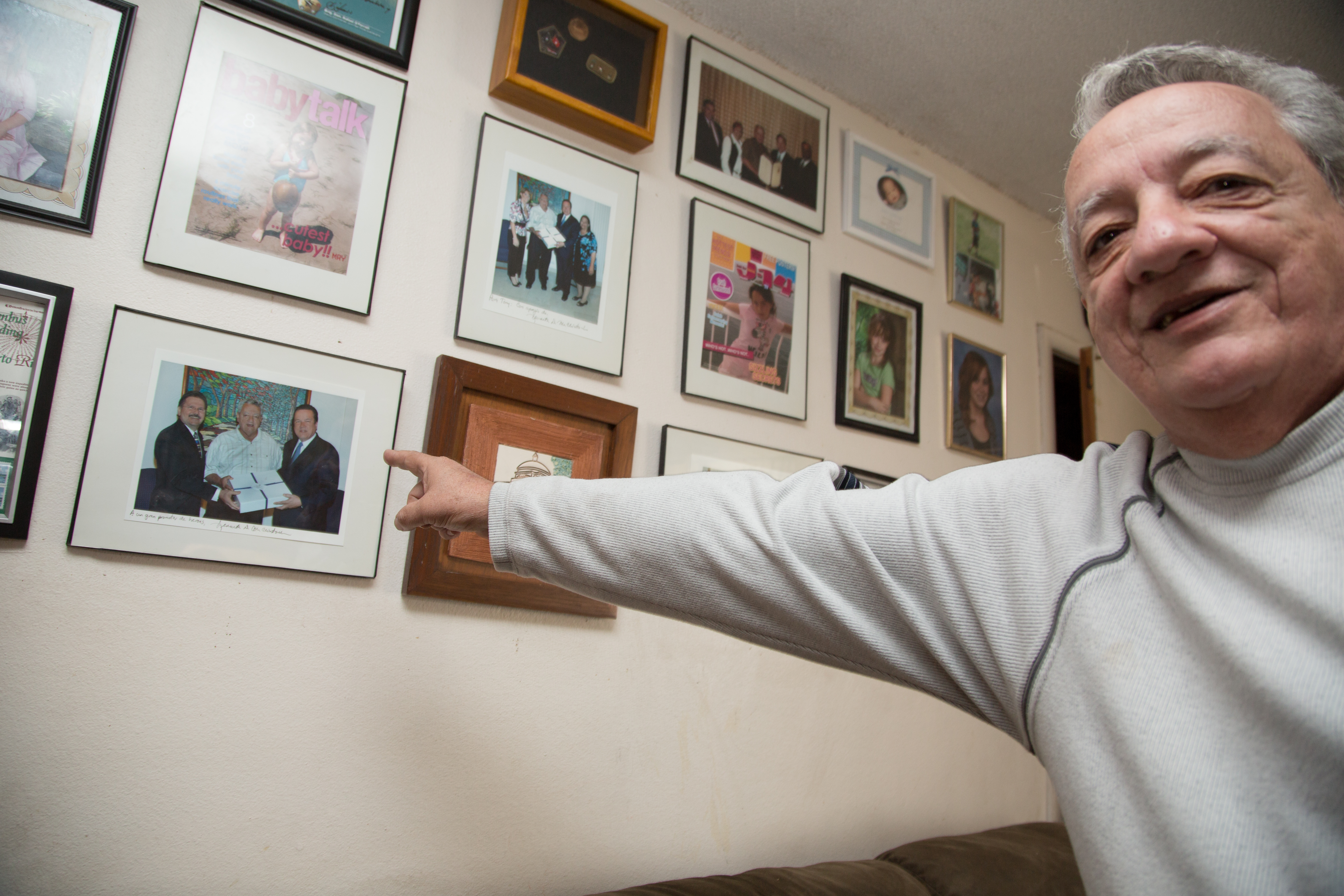
A man pointing at a photo

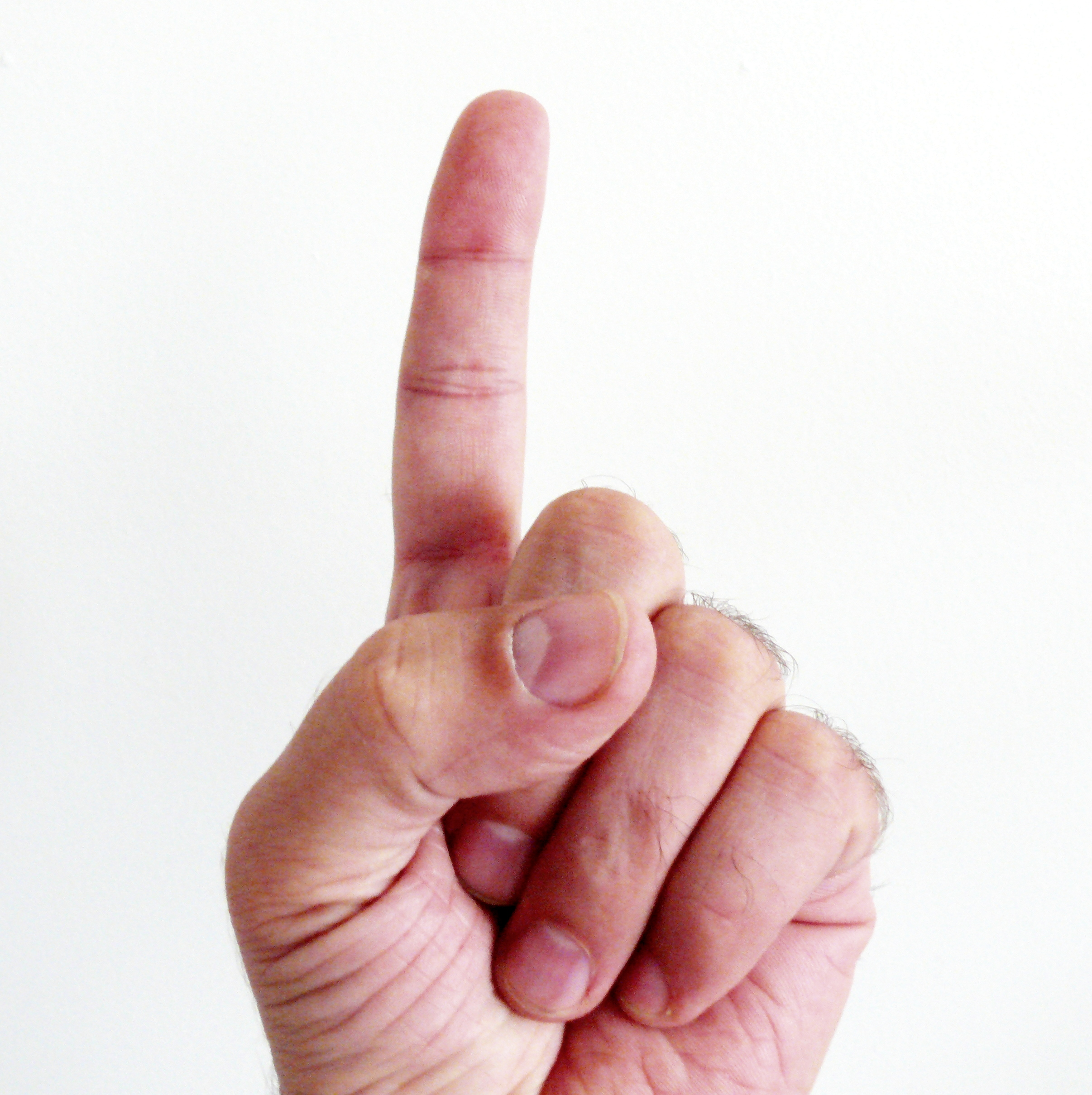
The "index finger pointing up" sign

- Pointing with index finger may be used to indicate an item or person.
  - A pointing index finger raised upwards is used in Islam as an affirming gesture of Tawhid though it has been also used in more political contexts, particularly by groups more extremist in ideology such as ISIS.
- The Rabia gesture, whose origins are unknown; used by the Muslim Brotherhood, its affiliates, and its supporters in Egypt since late August 2013, following a sit-in dispersal and fatal clashes at Nasr City's Rabaa al-Adawiya Square. The gesture is identical to a common gesture for the number four.
- Raised fist is mostly used by activists to express solidarity and defiance against oppression.
- The Ring is an Italian gesture used in conversation to delineate precise information, or emphasize a specific point. It is made similarly to the A-Ok sign, but the ring made by the thumb and forefinger is on top with the palm facing medially. The arm moves up and down at the elbow. If more emphasis is needed both hands will make the gesture simultaneously with the palms facing one another.
- Roman salute is a salute made by a small group of people holding their arms outward with fingertips touching. It was adopted by the Italian Fascists and likely inspired the Hitler salute.
- Salute refers to a number of gestures used to display respect, especially among armed forces.
- Scout handshake is a left-handed handshake used as a greeting among members of various Scouting organizations.
- Shaka sign consists of extending the thumb and little finger upward. It is used as a gesture of friendship in Hawaii and surf culture.
- Shrug with only one hand (rotating of wrist and opening hand palm upward) is used to signal confusion or "what?" - can be accompanied by squinting of eyes, slightly open mouth, and slight rotating of head (as if to listen more with one ear).
- The so-so gesture expresses neutral ("so-so") sentiment or mild dissatisfaction ("meh"), or can describe an uncertain situation ("maybe"). The hand is held parallel to the ground (face down) and rocked slightly.
- Signal for Help is a single-handed gesture that can be used over a video call or in person by an individual to alert others that they feel threatened and need help. The signal is performed by holding one hand up with the thumb tucked into the palm, then folding the four other fingers down, symbolically trapping the thumb by the rest of the fingers. It was designed intentionally as a single continuous hand movement, rather than a sign held in one position, so it could be made easily visible.
- Talk to the hand is an English-language slang expression of contempt popular during the 1990s. The associated hand gesture consists of extending a palm toward the person insulted.

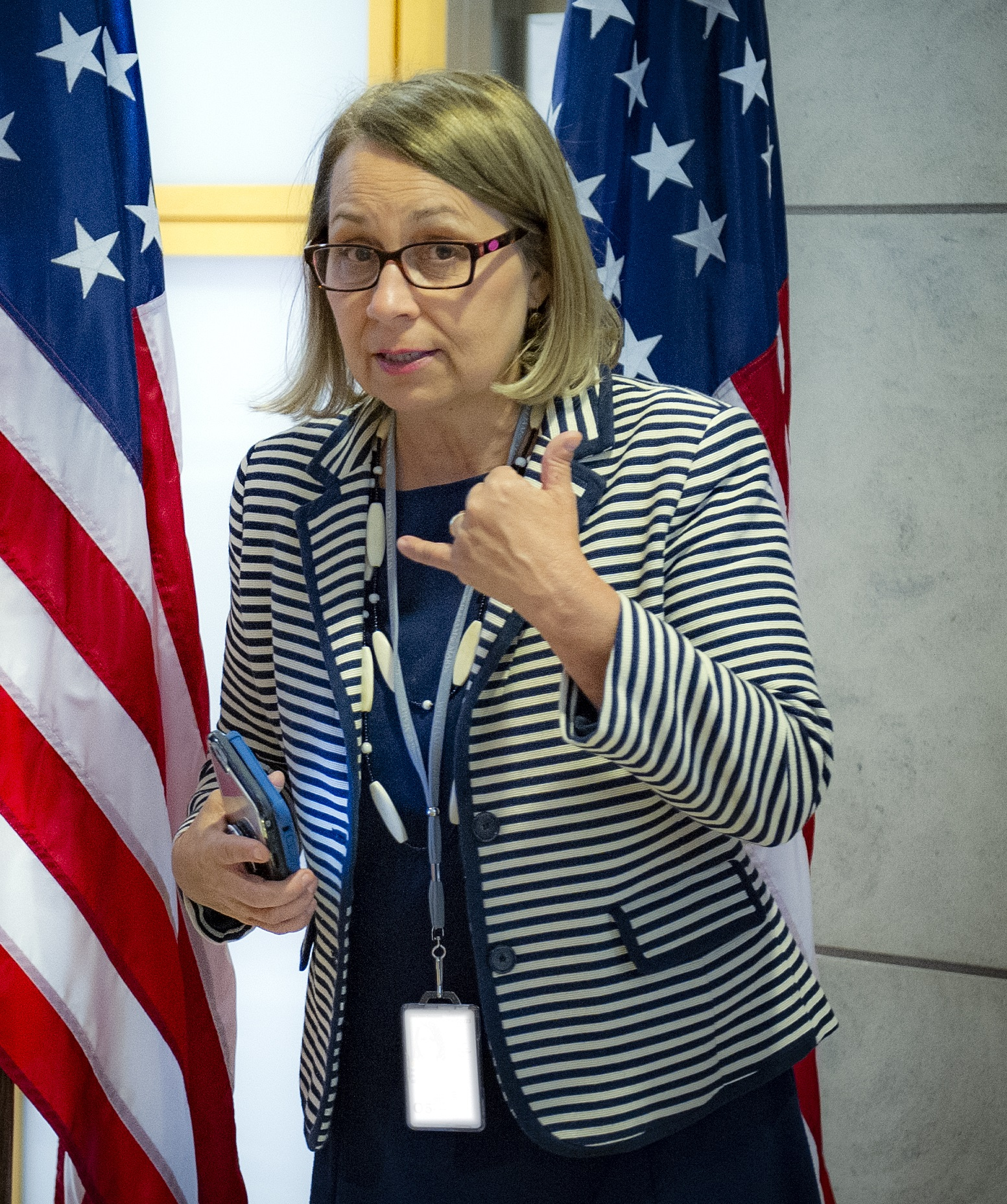
"Call me" or "I'll call you" gesture

- Telephone. Thumb and little finger outstretched, other fingers tight against palm. Thumb to ear and little finger to mouth as though they were a telephone receiver. Used to say, "I'll call you", or may be used to request a future telephone conversation or to tell someone of a call. In the 2020s, it was noted that younger people who have grown up in the era of smartphones use a flat palm to indicate a telephone. Before one-piece receivers became widespread in the 1940s, the telephone gesture used two hands to indicate a separate receiver and a mouthpiece.
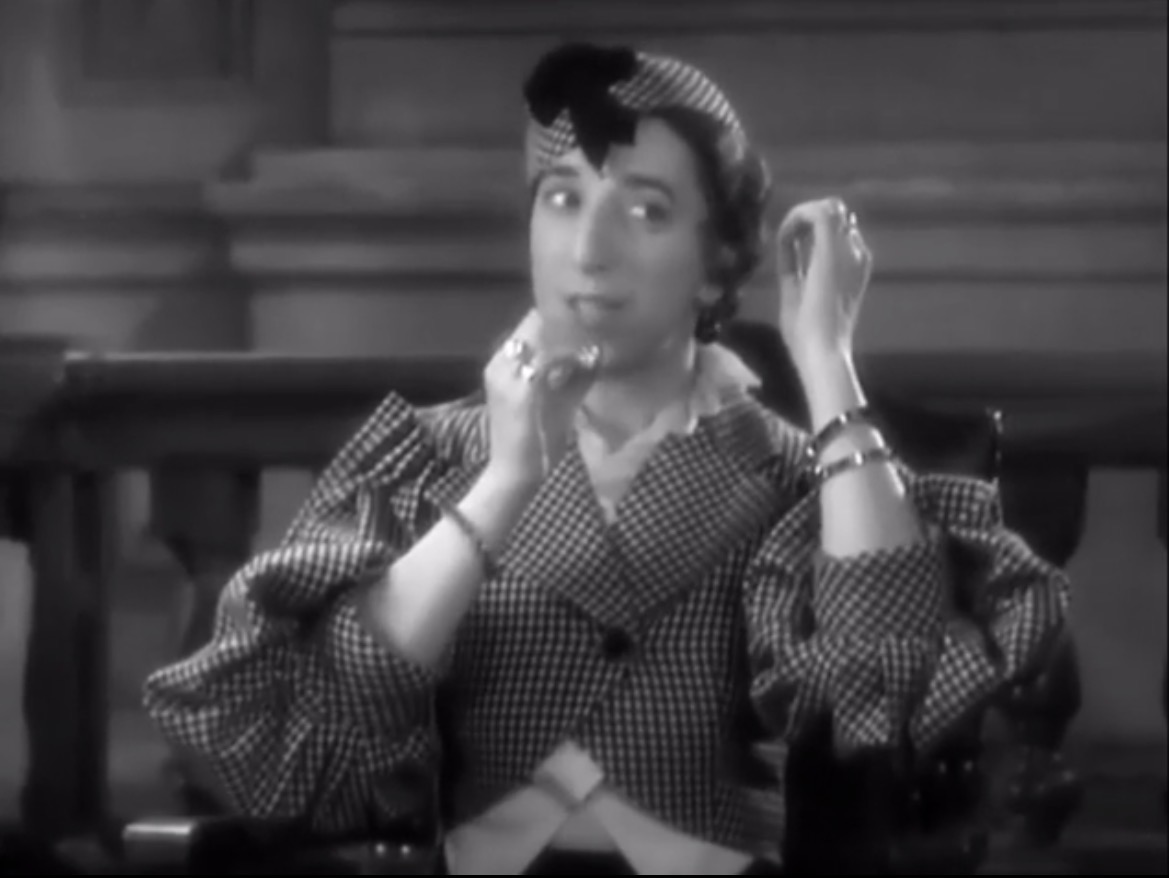
- Actress Margaret Hamilton makes the 'telephone' gesture in 1934, representing the separate mouthpiece and receiver of a candlestick telephone.
  Thanks can be given by holding a hand upright, palm outwards, with all fingers pointing upwards, with the hand at the same level as the face or just above, usually held for around a second, in British and other cultures. This is commonly used when traveling to show thanks to other people, such as thanking a bus driver from the other side of the bus, or thanking another traveller for voluntarily yielding to let another traveller pass.
- Serbian three-finger salute is a salute used by ethnic Serbs, made by extending the thumb, index, and middle fingers.
- The Scout's salute is a three-finger salute and sign used by members of the international Scout movement. It is made with the right hand, palm faced out, with the thumb holding down the little finger. As a salute, the fingertips touch the brow of the head. As a sign the hand is held at shoulder height.
- The three-finger salute appears in the franchise The Hunger Games. It is specifically used by members of District 12 to express admiration for someone.
- The term "three-finger salute" is also applied in a joking way to the finger.
- The 'K' sign is a gesture used in the mockumentary series People Just Do Nothing by the crew of Kurupt FM (a fictional radio station). The gesture is performed by tucking the thumb behind the palm and extending all fingers at slight angles to make the letter K. In the television series, and at the group's live shows, character encourage people to "Throw your K's up".

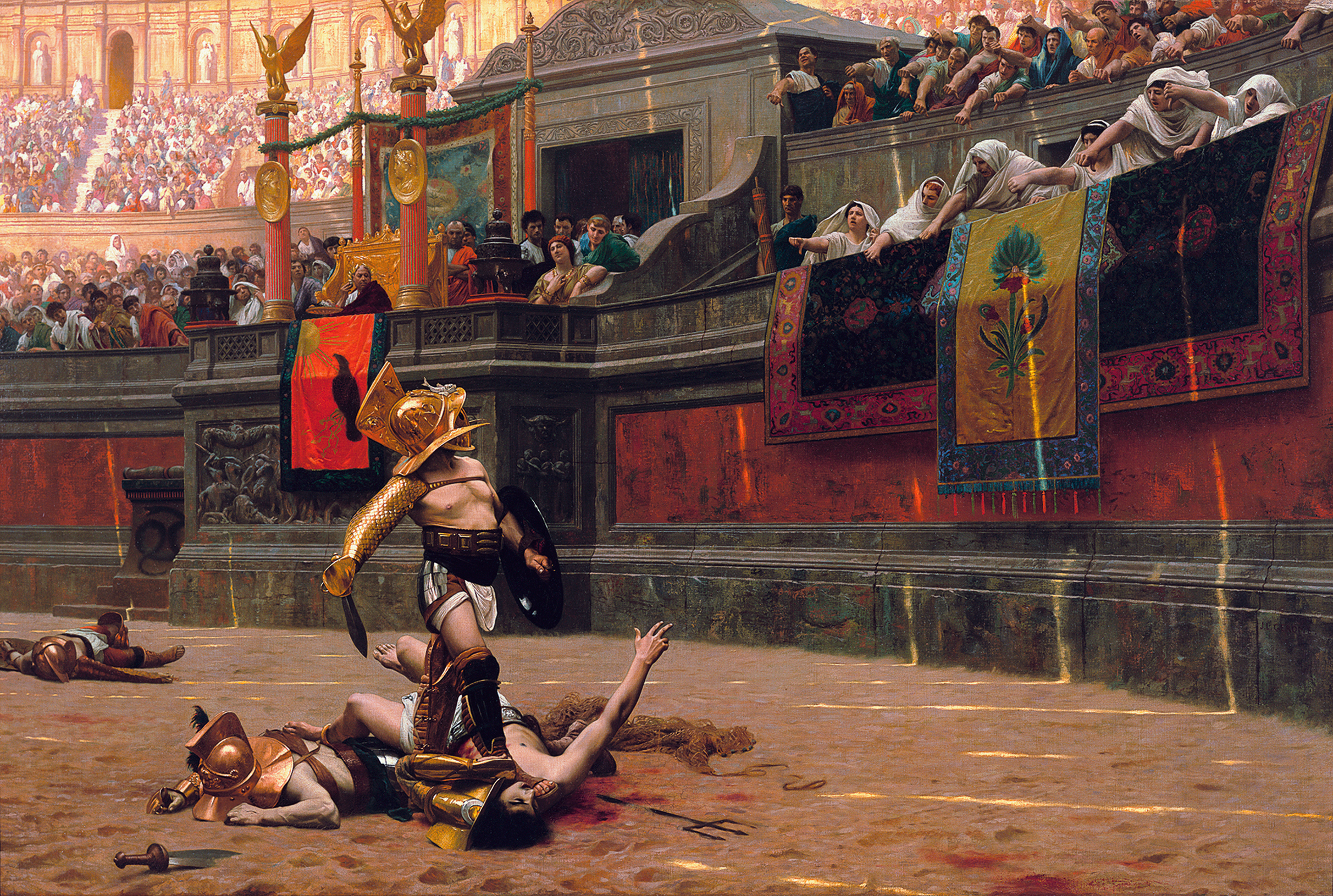
Pollice Verso (from Latin: with a turned thumb) by Jean-Léon Gérôme, depicting a number of gestures, including the thumbs down from the spectators and the Vestal Virgins, signaling the victor to execute death, and the outstretched hand of the defeated, begging for mercy

- Thumbs Up and Thumbs Down are common gestures of approval or disapproval made by extending the thumb upward or downward. The Thumbs Up or Thumbs down is also a gesture used in scuba diving to signal to partner to ascend or descend.
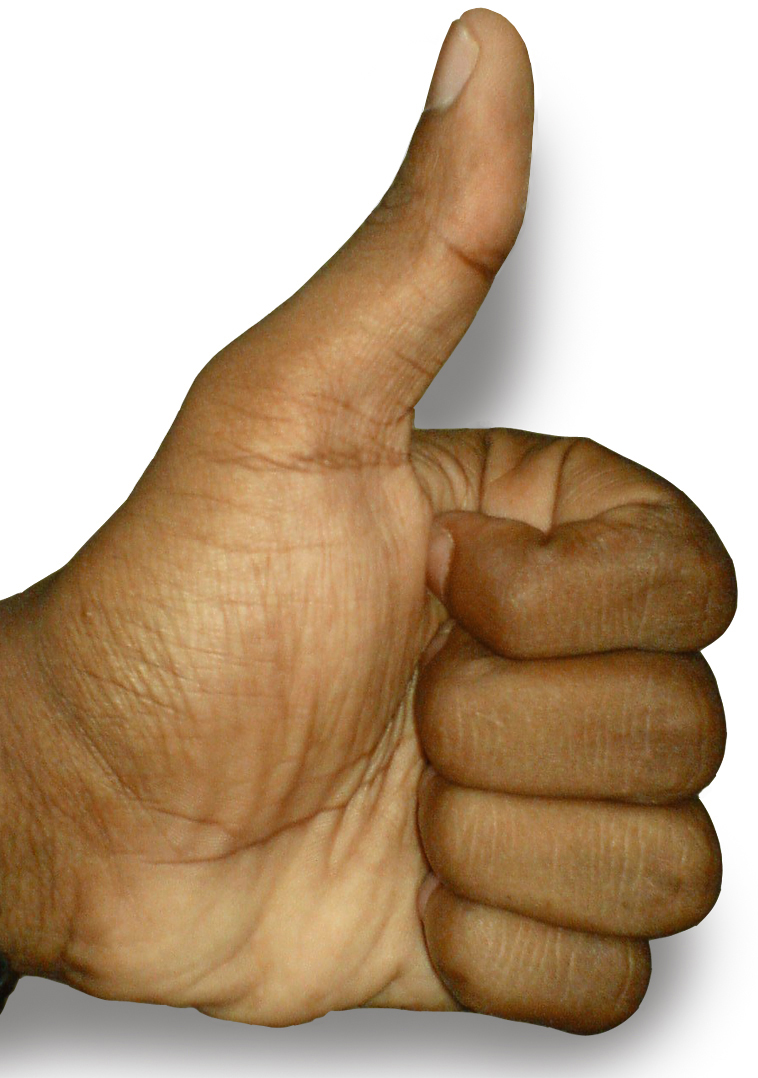
  Thumb up
- Two-finger salute is a salute made using the middle and index fingers. It is used by Polish Armed Forces and by Cub Scouts.
- V sign or Victory hand is made by raising the index and middle fingers and separating them to form a V, usually with the palm facing outwards. This sign began to be used during World War II to indicate "V for Victory". In the 1960s, the hippie-movement began to use the V-sign to mean "peace", especially in the United States. It is also used in most coastal east Asian nations, in either orientation, as an indication of cuteness when being photographed. Examples are China, Japan, South Korea, Taiwan and Thailand.
  - V sign as an insult is made by raising the index finger and middle finger separated to form a V with the back of the hand facing outwards. This is an offensive gesture in the United Kingdom, South Africa, Australia, New Zealand and Ireland.
- Vulcan salute was used in the television program Star Trek. It consists of all fingers raised and parted between the ring and middle fingers with the thumb sticking out to the side. It was devised and popularized by Leonard Nimoy, who portrayed the half-Vulcan character Mr. Spock, and who wrote in his memoir I Am Not Spock that he had based it on the Priestly Blessing performed by Jewish Kohanim with both hands, thumb to thumb in this same position, representing the Hebrew letter Shin (ש).
- Wanker gesture is made by curling the fingers into a loose fist and moving the hand up and down as though masturbating. The gesture has the same meaning as the British slang insult, "wanker".

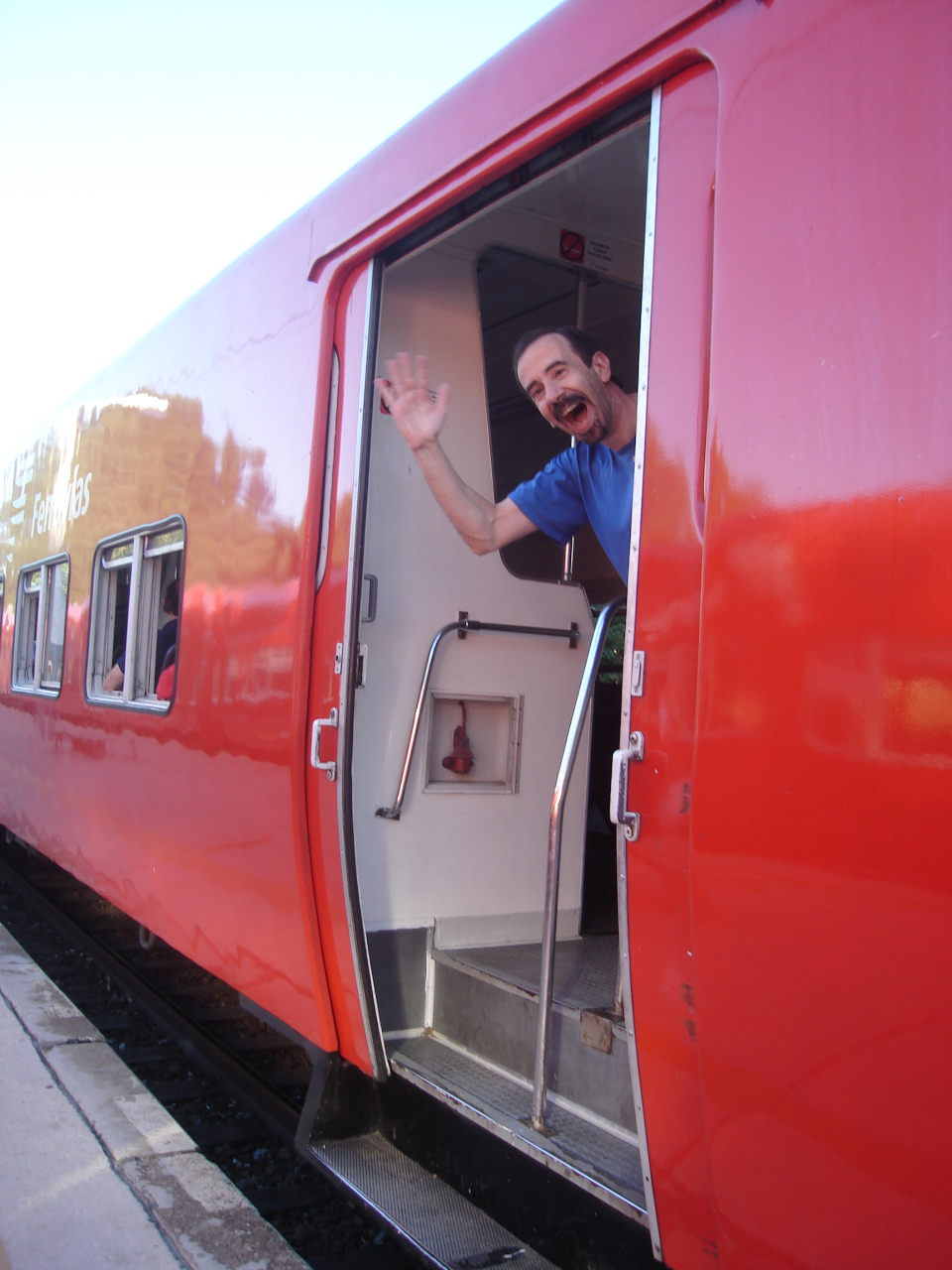
Waving

- Wave is a gesture in which the hand is raised and moved left and right, as a greeting or sign of departure.

== Two handed ==
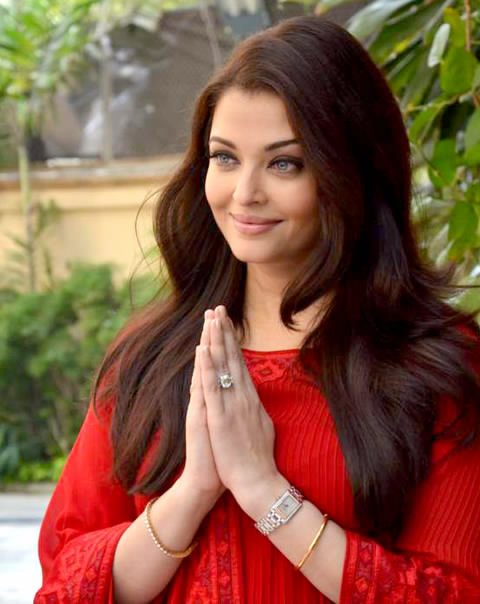
Añjali Mudrā or Namaste gesture.

- Air quotes are made by raising both hands to eye level and flexing the index and middle fingers of both hands while speaking. Their meaning is similar to that of scare quotes in writing.
- Añjali Mudrā (namaste) is a sign of respect in India and other South East Asian countries like Thailand, it is made by pressing the palms together. This is of buddhist origin.
- Applause is an expression of approval made by clapping the hands together to create repetitive staccato noise. Applause is most appropriate within a group setting, to collectively show approval by the volume, duration, and clamor of the noise.
- Awkward turtle is a two handed gesture used to mark a moment as awkward. One hand is placed flat atop the other with both palms facing down, fingers extended outward from the hand and thumbs stuck out to the sides. The thumbs are rotated to symbolize flippers.
- Batsu. In Japanese culture, the batsu (literally: ×-mark) is a gesture made by crossing one's arms in the shape of an "X" in front of them in order to indicate that something is "wrong" or "no good". Opposite of maru. Unicode emoji "U+1F645" 🙅.
- Bras d'honneur is an obscene gesture made by flexing one elbow while gripping the inside of the bent arm with the opposite hand.
- The Kohanic or Priestly Blessing – a gesture of benediction in Judaism, used (especially by those of Kohanic or priestly descent) when reciting the Priestly Blessing (Numbers 6: 22–26). Both hands are held up, palms toward the congregation, with the fingers grouped in twos – the little and ring fingers together, the index and second fingers together, and the tips of the two thumbs touching.
- The golf clap, unlike applause, is a timid and practically silent clapping of the palms together, to silently approve of something. It may be performed when loud applause is inappropriate; however, it may instead be done in mockery or to display faux approval.
- Dusting (or brushing) off hands derives from the natural way to remove powder (dirt, flour, sawdust, etc.): with open palms held together facing each other almost horizontal, the upper hand swipes once across the lower palm, then the hands switch orientation and the motion is performed with the other hand, and then repeated. As a figurative gesture meaning to forgo or disown, it parallels the phrase to wash one's hands of deriving from the biblical account of Pontius Pilate. Usually performed with three or four hand swipes, it can also be done with claps, and when the last clap is louder, it also suggests continued anger or frustration about the repudiated thing.
- Fist-and-palm, a traditional Chinese gesture used for greeting or showing respect.
- Hand-rubbing, rubbing both hands palms together along the fingers' direction may mean that one is expecting or anticipating something or that one feels cold.

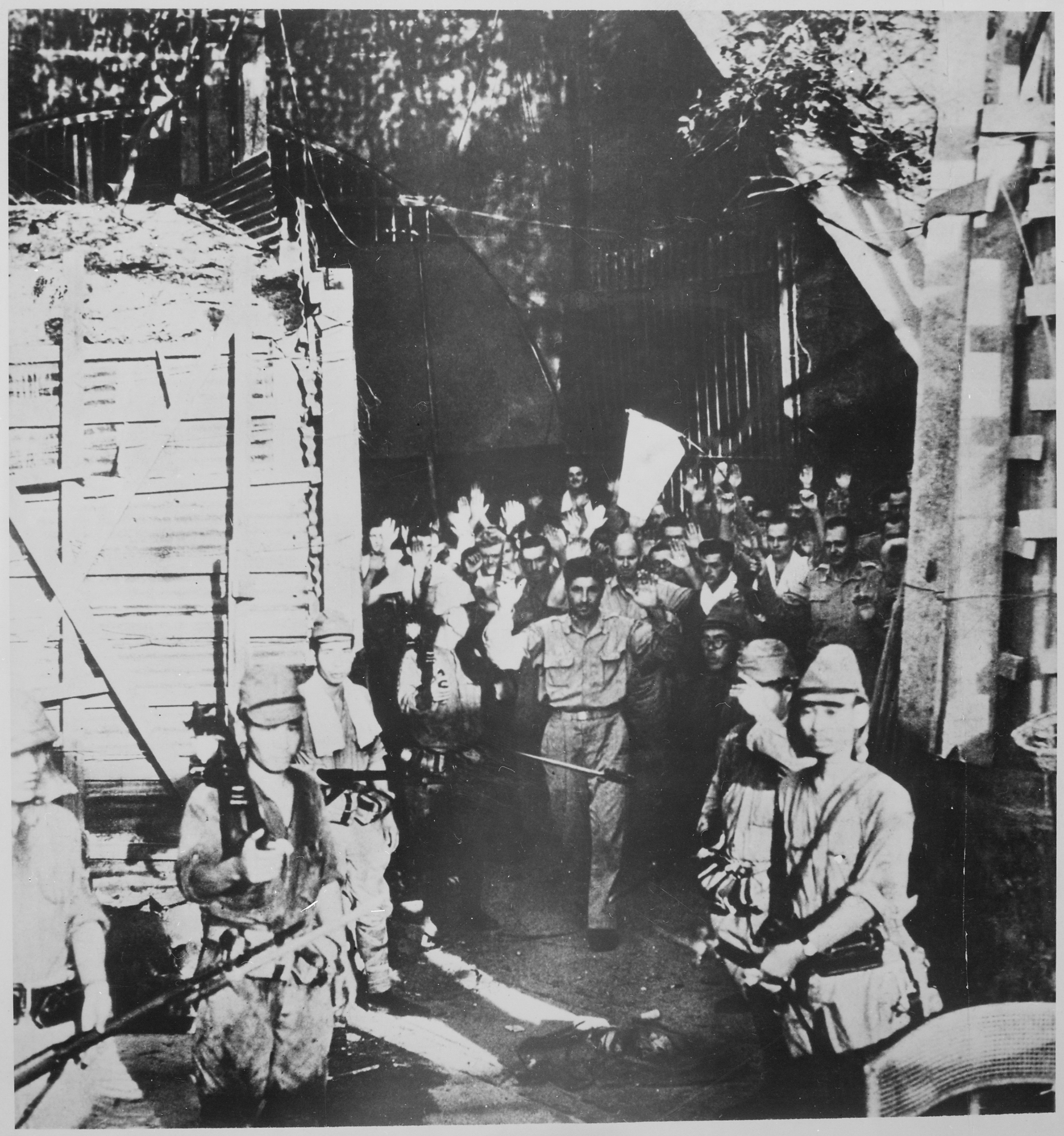
U.S. servicemen surrendering with raised hands during the Battle of Corregidor

- Hands up is a gesture expressing military surrender by lifting both hands. This may have originated with the concept of exposing one's hands to show one is unarmed and not a threat, and the utility of this gesture is still employed in captures and arrests.

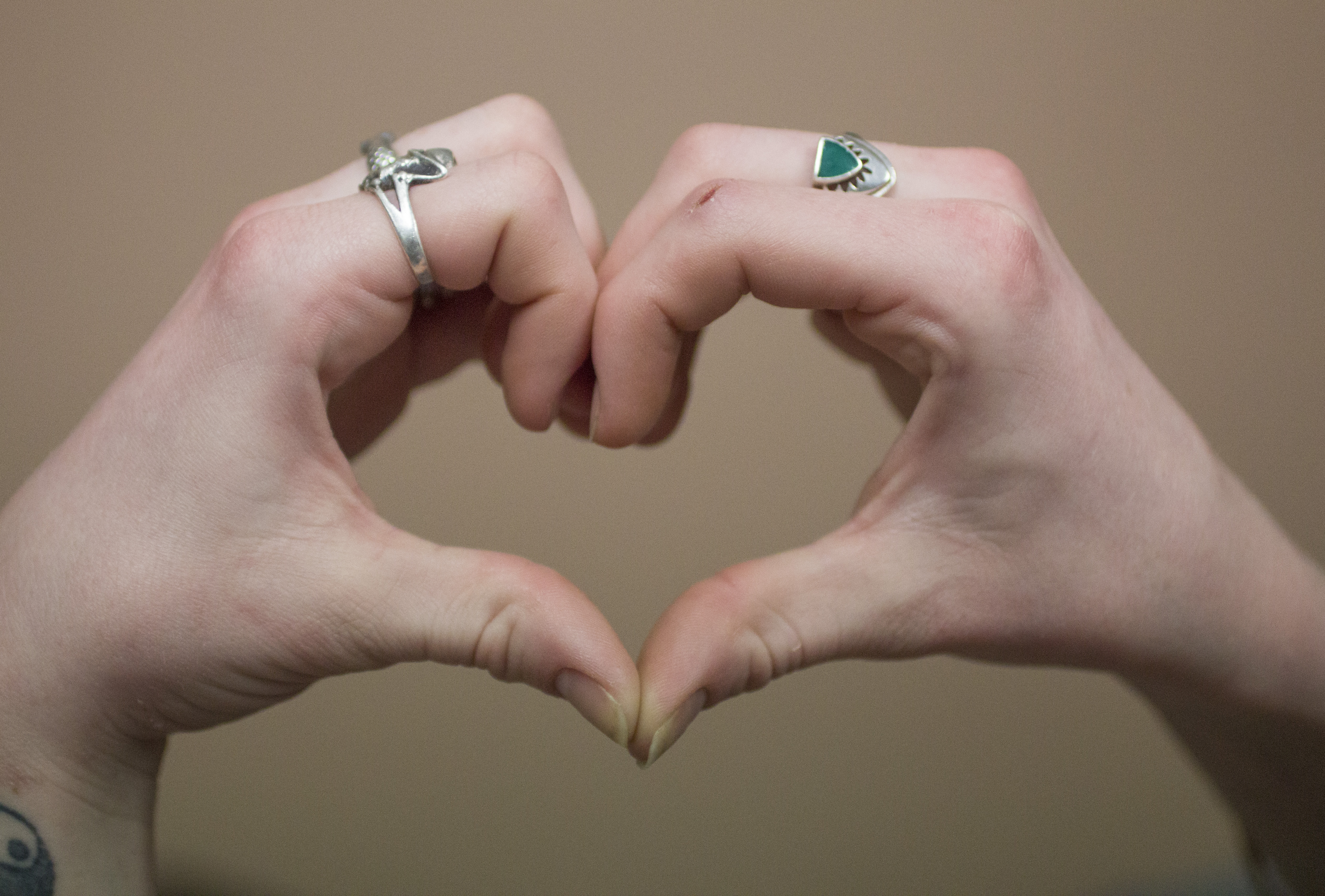
Hand heart

- The Dab is a gesture expressing triumph or playfulness in which one's head is dropped into the bent elbow of one arm while raising the opposite arm straight out parallel.
- Hand heart is a recent pop culture symbol meaning love. The hands form the shape of a heart.

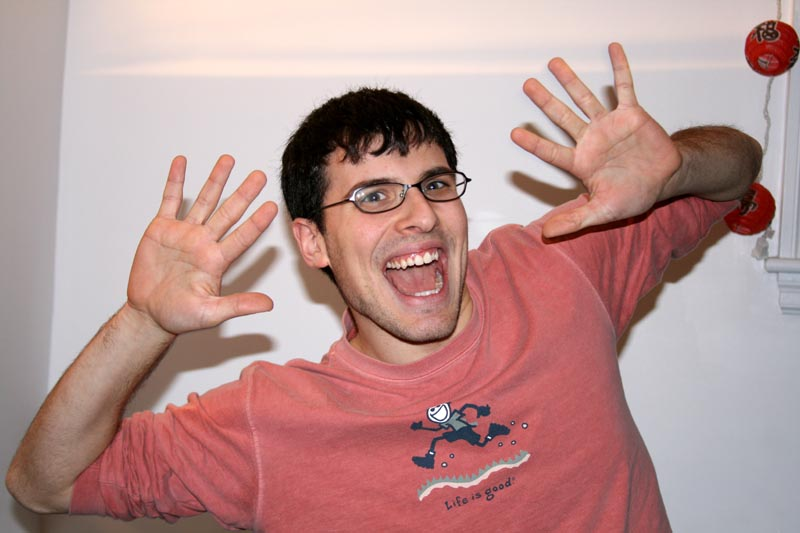
Jazz hands

- Jazz hands are used in dance or other performances by displaying the palms of both hands with fingers splayed.
- The Kung fu salute (武术抱拳礼) is a formal demonstration of respect between martial arts practitioners in which the right hand (formed into a fist) is covered by the open left palm. A variant of the fist-and-palm.
- Mani Giunte is an Italian gesture used when expressing exasperation or disbelief by putting both palms together in prayer and moving them down and back up towards your chest repeatedly. Also known as the "Mother of God".
- Mano a borsa is an Italian gesture, used when something is unclear. It is created by extending all the digits on the hand bringing them together with palms facing up and moving the hand up and down by the action of the wrist and/or elbow. It implies a question, such as "what do you want?", "what are you saying?" or "what is your point?", and it generally requires a response. This gesture can be done with either hand or both hands.
- Maru, (literally "circle") in Japanese culture is a gesture made by holding both arms curved over the head with the hands joined, thus forming a circular shape, to express that something is "correct" or "good". This is the counterpart of "batsu", above, though its daily use is not quite as widespread. Unicode emoji "U+1F646" 🙆.

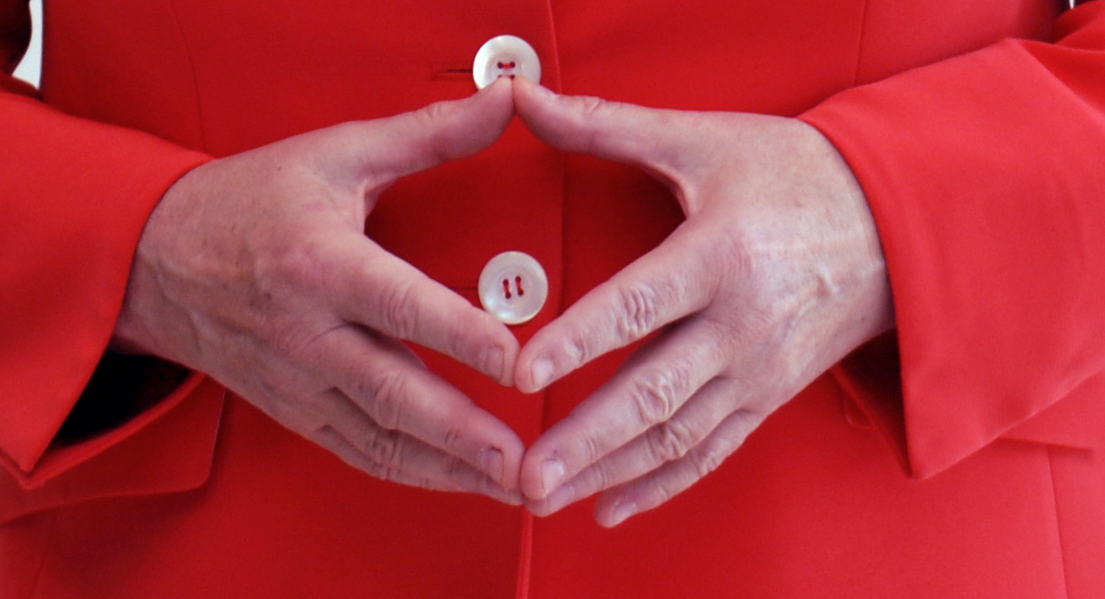
The Merkel-Raute

- Merkel-Raute: Described as "probably one of the most recognizable hand gestures in the world", the signature gesture of Angela Merkel has become a political symbol used by both her supporters and opponents.
- Ogham: There is direct evidence for the existence of a system of ogham hand signals. The ogam tract In Lebor Ogaim mentions two forms of finger spelling; cossogam ('foot-ogham') and sronogam ('nose-ogham'). Cossogam involves putting the fingers to the right or left of the shinbone for the first or second aicmi, and across it diagonally or straight for the third or fourth aicmi. One finger is used for the first letter, two for the second, and so on. Sronogam involves the same procedure with the ridge of the nose. Placing the finger straight across the shinbone or nose for the fourth aicme mimics the later, manuscript form of the letters. Another alphabet, basogam ('palm-ogham') is mentioned which seems to involve striking the hand in various ways against wood. Probably the angle of the hand indicated the aicme while the number of strikes indicated the letter. The inclusion of these alphabets in the Tract shows that a connection between the ogham letters and fingers was still known at the time the Book of Ballymote was written in the Middle Ages. Further evidence of the possible use of ogham hand gestures comes in the form of various literary references to finger signs. Plummer (1910 p cxvi) cites several works which mention the use of finger signs, including the Life of Saint Brendan.
- Open palms is a gesture seen in humans and other animals as a psychological and subconscious behaviour in body language to convey trust, openness and compliance.
- Praying hands, a reverent clasping of the hands together, is an expression used in most major religions during prayer. The palms of the hands are held together with the fingers extended and touching or the fingers folded upon the opposite hand. This gesture is often made with the two hands held at chest or head level, the elbows against the side, and the head bowed towards the hands.
- Quenelle: The gesture created by French comedian Dieudonné was often associated with anti-Zionism or antisemitic sentiments. It is compared to the bras d'honneur and the Nazi salute. It is made by touching the shoulder of an outstretched arm with the palm of the other hand.
- Shame is symbolized in North America by rubbing the back of one forefinger with the other forefinger. In the stage directions of the German libretto of Der Freischütz it is called Rübchen schabend which translates to scrubbing carrots. The musical film adaptation Hunter's Bride shows not the gesture but literal scrubbing of carrots.
- A partial Shrug (without shoulders) is sometimes used in the to signal low confidence, innocence, or "I don't know".
- Suck it is used to express superiority over another by forming an X with hands over the groin area. First used by wrestling group DX of the WWE in 1997.
- TT: Made by making a fist and extending the thumb and index finger, making an uppercase 'T' shape. Hold your hands so the 'T' rests on both of your cheeks directly under your eyes, palms facing in. This sign indicates the user is upset or crying, as the sign illustrates tears pooling under the eyes and falling down their face. The sign is derived from South Korea, featured in popular K-pop group Twice (group)'s song called TT (song) and its corresponding dance.
- T-sign: Made by holding one hand vertically and tapping the fingertips with the palm of the other hand held horizontally such that the two hands form the shape of the letter T. A variant uses the forearms in place of the hands. It is used in many sports to request a timeout; in cricket, it is used by players to request the review of the third umpire.
- Victory clasp is used to exclaim victory by clasping one's own hands together and shaking them to one's side to another at, or above, one's head.
- Whatever – made with the thumb and forefinger of both hands to form the letter "W", the gesture is used to signal that something is not worth the time and energy. It was popularized by the movie Clueless.
- Zoltan is a sign of support for the Pittsburgh Pirates. It is made by placing the tip of one thumb on top of the other, and opening the palms of both hands to form the letter Z.

== Eyes and eyebrows ==
- Akanbe, performed by pulling a lower eyelid down to expose the red underneath, often while also sticking out one's tongue, and is a childish insult in Japanese culture. A similar gesture (accompanied by the phrase Mon œil – "My eye") signifies disbelief in France; in Bulgaria it is paired instead with a variation of "Do you see a boat sailing in my eye?".
- Butterfly kissing, getting an eye close to another person's eye and fluttering the eyelids rapidly; used to express love.
- Cut-eye, gesture of condemnation in Jamaica and some of North America.
- Eyebrow raising. In Marshall Islands culture, briefly raising the eyebrows is used to acknowledge the presence of another person or to signal assent. It is also commonly used in the Philippines to signal affirmation much like nodding is used in western cultures. An eyebrow flash is used for various meanings in other settings as well.
- Eye-rolling, performed by rotating the eyes upward and back down; can indicate incredulity, contempt, boredom, frustration, or exasperation; can be performed unconsciously or consciously; occurs in many countries of the world, and is especially common among adolescents. It has been added to the Unicode emoji as "U+1F644 🙄 face with rolling eyes".
- Winking, A wink is a facial expression made by briefly closing one eye. A wink is an informal mode of non-verbal communication usually signaling shared hidden knowledge or intent. However, it is ambiguous by itself and highly dependent upon additional context, without which a wink could become misinterpreted or even nonsensical

== Mouth ==
- Air kiss, conveys meanings similar to kissing, but is performed without making bodily contact.
- Blowing a raspberry or Bronx cheer, signifies mockery by sticking out the tongue and blowing (linguolabial trill) to create a sound similar to flatulence.
- Cheek kissing, pressing one's lips to another person's cheek, may show friendship or greeting.
- Duck face, a popular gesture among teenagers which involves puckering lips. The gesture is often used as a "funny face" when taking pictures.
- Fish lips: sucking the lips in a manner that makes the mouth look like one of a fish.
- Shush, the index finger of one hand is extended and placed vertically in front of the lips, with the remaining fingers curled toward the palm with the thumb forming a fist; used to demand or request silence from those to whom it is directed. Can be silent or accompanied by an audible "Sssh!" sound which alone has the same meaning. Used with the same meaning in most countries, it is also considered a universal gesture.
- Sucking-teeth, also known as Hiss Teeth, Kiss Teeth, "steups" or "stiups", a gesture used in many African and African diaspora in the Americas cultures, especially in the West Indies and West Africa, to signal disagreement, dislike, impatience, annoyance or anger.
- Exaggerated yawning, generally with one hand held to the mouth, is used to express boredom.
- Pointing, people point to directions, objects or people pursing their lips towards the target they want to point at.

== Made with other body parts ==
- Anasyrma, performed by lifting the skirt or kilt; used in some religious rituals.
- Bowing, lowering the torso or head; a show of respect in many cultures.
- Curtsey, a greeting typically made by women, performed by bending the knees while bowing the head.
- Davai vyp'yem (Russian drinking sign), the index finger is flicked against the side of the neck, just below the jaw.
- Elbow bump, a greeting similar to the handshake or fist bump made by touching elbows. This gesture began to grow in popularity during the COVID-19 pandemic.
- Eskimo kissing, a gesture in Western cultures loosely based on an Inuit greeting, performed by two people touching noses.

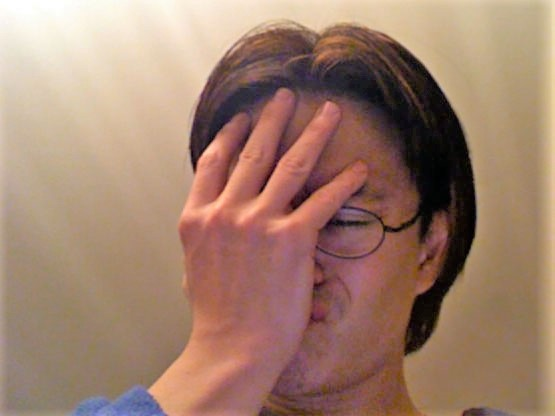
Facepalm

- Facepalm, an expression of frustration or embarrassment made by raising the palm of the hand to the face (🤦).
- Genuflection, a show of respect by bending at least one knee to the ground.
- Hand-kissing, a greeting made by kissing the hand of a person worthy of respect.
- Hat tip or doff, a salutation or show of respect made by two people removing their hats.
- Head bobble, an affirmative response or acknowledgement common in India.
- Head shake, indicates a negative reaction to a query or a rejection in English-speaking cultures; also used occasionally in disbelief.
- Headbanging a deep and abrupt shaking of the head, sometimes to whip long hair back and forth. Done in time with music, headbanging is used as a sign of excitement and appreciation of a performance.
- Hongi, a traditional Māori greeting in New Zealand, performed by pressing one's nose and forehead (at the same time) to another person.
- Kowtow, shows respect by bowing deeply and touching one's head to the ground (🙇).
- Mooning, a show of disrespect by displaying one's bare buttocks.
- Motorcycling greetings include a leg shake in France.
- Mudra, ritual gestures in Hinduism or Buddhism.
- Namaste is a praying hands gesture usually coupled with a greeting and a head bow.
- Nod, tilting the head up and down that usually indicates assent in Western Europe, North America, and the Indian subcontinent, among other places, but a nod also means the opposite in other places, such as Bulgaria. When shaken once firmly, it is an expression of strong agreement such as "Indeed" or "Yes sir." When shaken quickly the person is indicating a desire to move along with the topic.
- Orant, a gesture made during prayer in which the hands are raised with palms facing outward.
- Puppy face, tilting the head down with eyes looking up, like a puppy; has a number of uses, such as begging for something.
- Putting a slightly cupped hand, with palm down, under the chin and then flicking the fingers out (usually once or twice), a common gesture in Italy for expressing indifference; became the center of a controversy in March 2006, when United States Supreme Court Associate Justice Antonin Scalia was photographed allegedly making the gesture to illustrate his response to his critics; a Boston Herald reporter misinterpreted it as "obscene" but Scalia later explained that he merely meant "I couldn't care less."
- Shoulder flick, using one's fingers to flick off an imaginary speck of dirt or dust on one's shoulder. Denotes that the effort that was undertaken was hardly worth the trouble entailed.
- Shrug, lifting both shoulders indicates lack of knowledge or concern (🤷). Sometimes the gesture is a palms upwards from bent elbows motion with possible raised eyebrows.
- Sampeah, a Cambodian greeting or gesture of respect made by lining up the palms and fingers together while bowing.
- Scout sign and salute, the use of the three-finger salute by Scout and Guide organizations.
- Sign of the Cross, used in many Christian rituals, consists of drawing the shape of a cross over one's body or in the air.
- Thai greeting, or wai, shows respect or reverence by pressing the palms and fingers together.

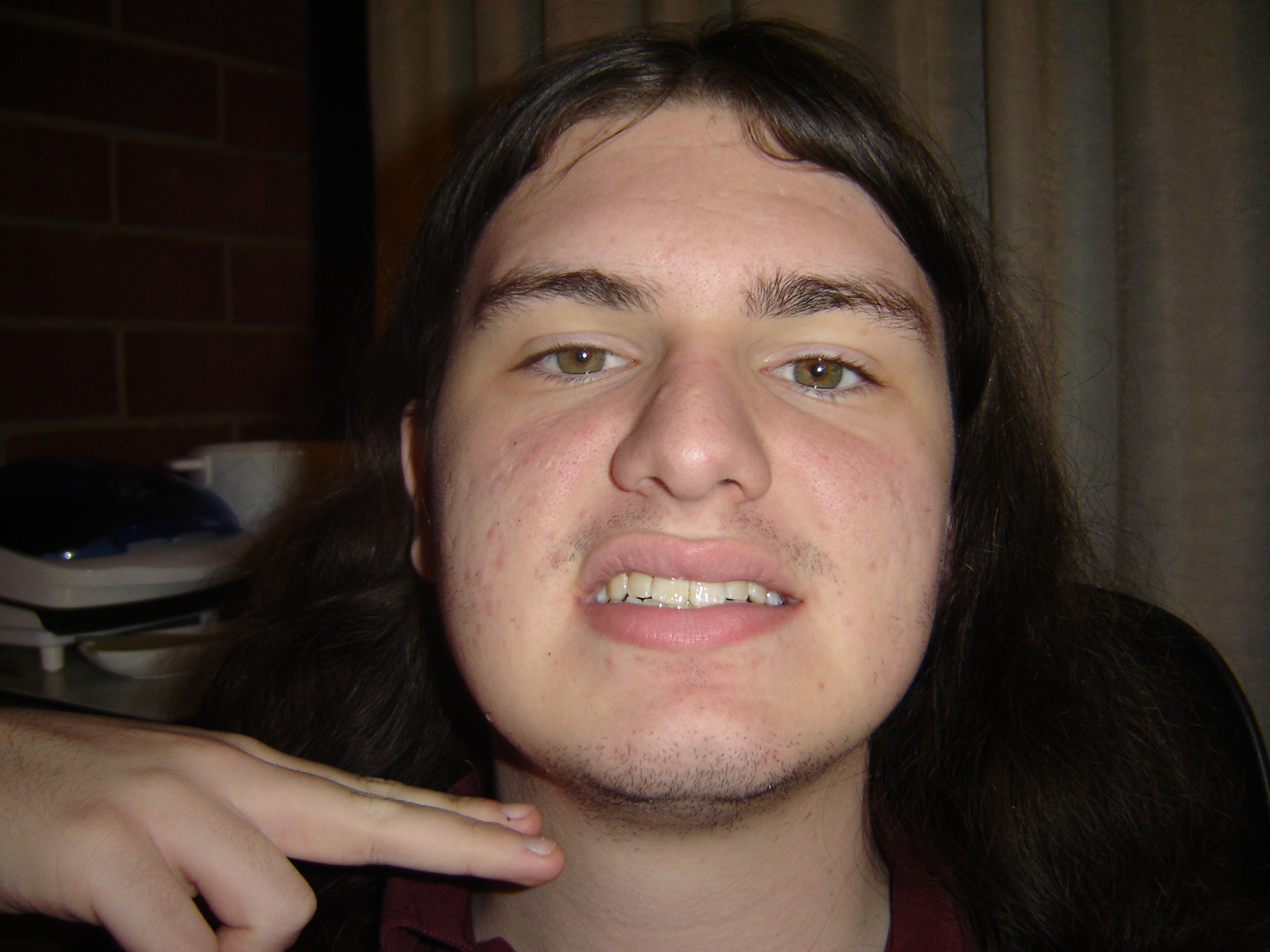
The "cut-throat" or throat slash gesture

- Throat slash, made by moving one's index finger, thumb or entire hand, held straight and with palm down, horizontally across one's throat; the gesture imitates cutting a person's throat with a blade, indicating strong disapproval, extreme anger, or displeasure with others or with oneself; alternatively, it can be a silent signal to stop something, i.e. to "cut" broadcasting.
- Thumbing the nose (also known as Anne's Fan or Queen Anne's Fan and sometimes referred to as cocking a snook), a sign of derision in Britain made by putting the thumb on the nose, holding the palm open and perpendicular to the face, and wiggling the remaining fingers, often combined with sticking out the tongue.
- Touching heads is a gesture to express positive emotions between friends, relatives, lovers etc.
- Twisting the cheek. Thumb and forefinger are placed against the cheek, and a screwing motion, as if making a dimple, is made by twisting the wrist; in Italian culture, this can mean that something is delicious; in Germany, the gesture can be used to suggest that someone is crazy
- Woe is me, a melodramatic gesture of distress made by lifting the arm and placing the back of the hand on the forehead.
- Zemnoy poklon or "great bow", used in some Eastern Orthodox Christian rituals, consists of bowing deeply and lowering one's head to the ground.

== See also ==
- Cheironomy
- Facial expression
- Hand signals
- List of mudras
- Manual communication
- Miming
- Obscene gesture
