= Motorcycling greetings =

Gestures made between motorcyclists

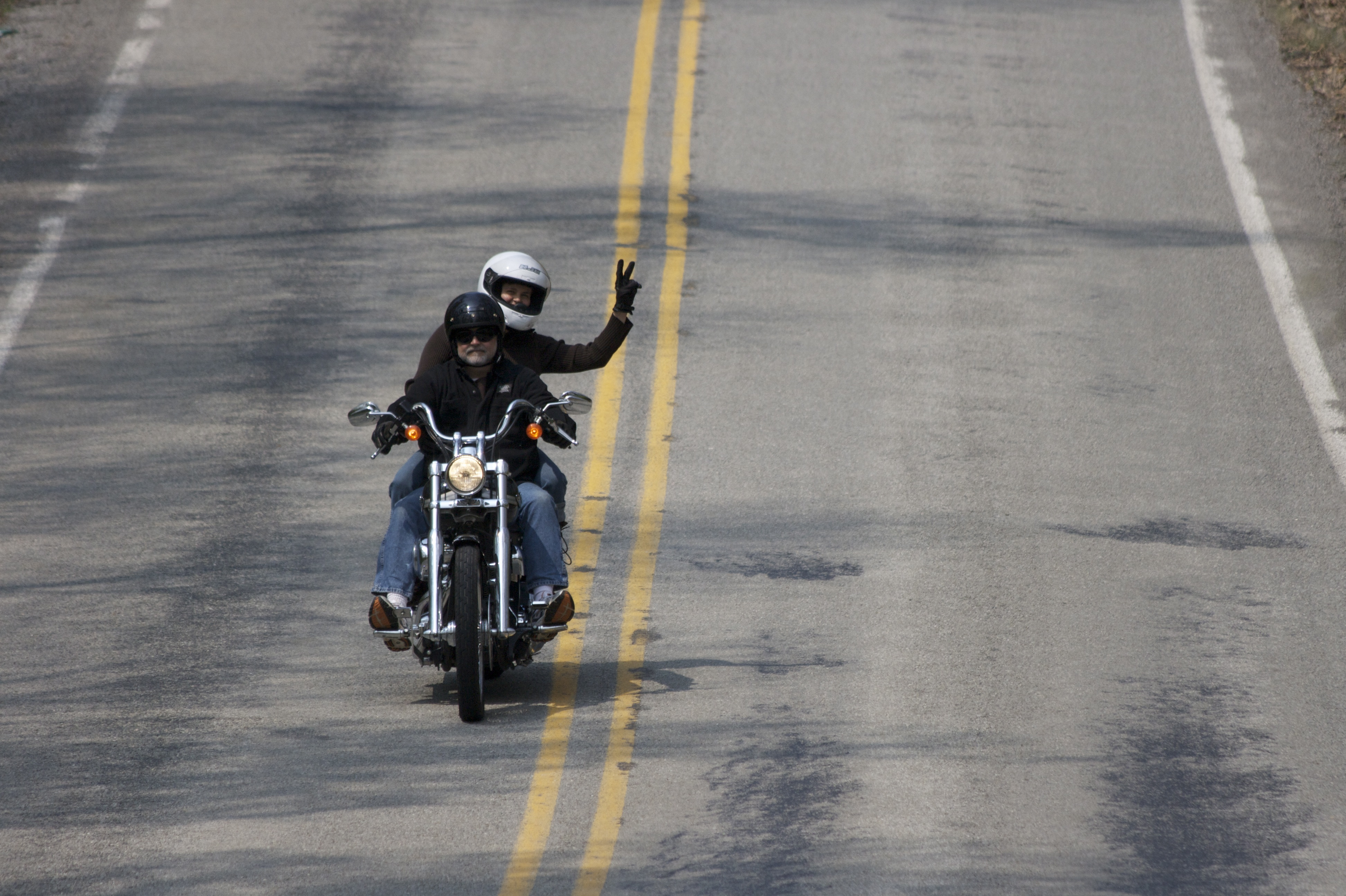
A motorcycle passenger using a V sign

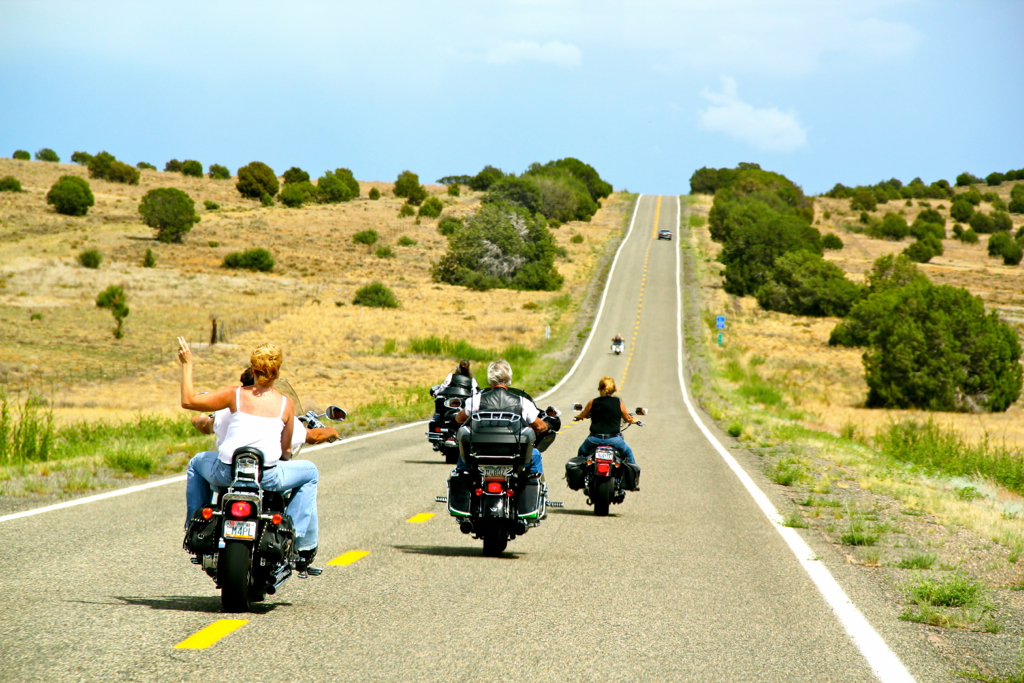
A group ride

Motorcycling greetings can include several gestures made between motorcyclists on the road. Titles for this greeting include "Biker wave", "Motorcyclist wave", "Motorcycle wave" or just "The Wave." The greeting made can include a number of gestures including a nod, a pointed finger, palm-out V sign, palm-in fingers-down V sign, or an actual raised-hand wave.

== Warnings ==
Motorcyclists may use specialized hand signals to both greet and warn oncoming riders:

- Circling raised finger — police ahead
- Patting helmet — check your lights or police ahead

== Regional differences ==
The use of specific gestures may be culturally or regionally dependent. French riders will stick their foot out when overtaking another motorcycle, and while lane splitting when a car facilitates it.
