= Awkward turtle =

Slang hand gesture

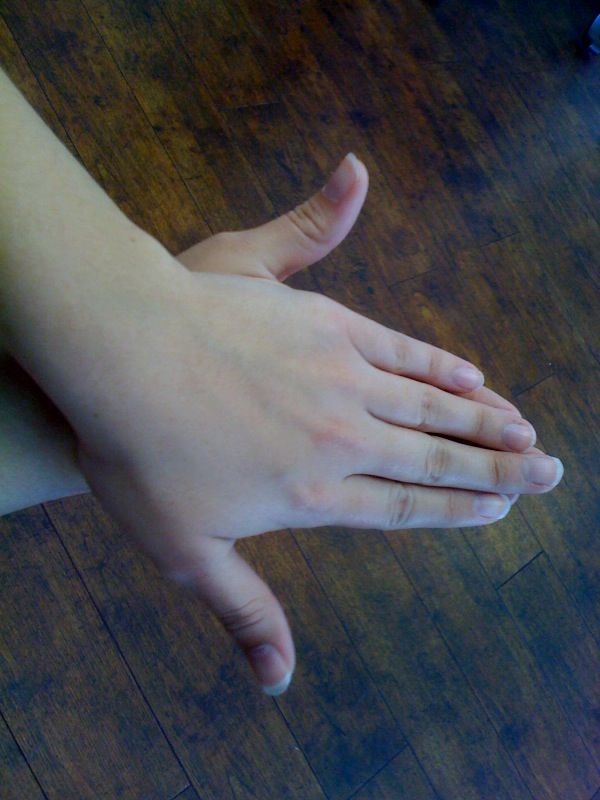
Awkward turtle hand gesture

Awkward turtle is a slang two-handed gesture used to silently mark a moment or situation as awkward. The gesture is likely used in most cases playfully and ironically. Some have remarked that giving the gesture is a sort of celebration of social discomfort.

The awkward turtle is gestured by placing one hand flat atop the other with both palms facing down, thumbs stuck out to the sides and rotating to look like flippers.

== History ==
The gesture is believed to have originally come from sign language. It is the common gesture for "turtle" and "tortoise" in Auslan.

A student journalist reported on the ubiquitousness of the awkward turtle hand gesture at the University of Pennsylvania on 3 February 2006. By 2008, Facebook reportedly had more than 500 "awkward turtle" groups, the largest of which had more than 27,000 members. "A Way with Words", a public radio program about language, cited it as slang from UCLA during a segment on "awkward turtle" on 10 October 2009.
