= Cheironomy =

Conducting a group of people singing (a choir)

Cheironomy or chironomy is a form of music conducting, typically with choral music and choral groups (choirs), where the use of hand gestures directs musical performance. In the modern artform, conductors tend to hoist batons for indicating melodic curves and ornaments.

== History ==
Early music (vocal church music), as far back as the 5th century, required some central direction from a leader in the coordination of singers in their delivery of melodic lines of mostly free rhythm. Traced back to early Egyptian performances through hieroglyphic documentation (etchings in stone depicting a leader employing hand signals to indicate pitch and rhythm details for wind instrument players), this form of conducting seems to predate Guido of Arezzo's designation of joints of the fingers for indicating pitches, and seems to have offered more than limited pitch instruction. These early leaders, or cheironomers, though possessing none of the modern conducting skills developed in the 17th century, using a form of choreographed hand signals, adeptly controlled the movement of the melodic lines, producing incredibly well-synchronized performances.

Cheironomy, though not a commonly used term in today's reference to conducting, serves, as it did in early music, as the model for the motions necessary to direct some modern music which requires individualized direction to specific players, within less metrically structured musical compositions. It is still in use in the liturgy of the Roman Catholic Church (despite a decline of chant in the late twentieth century), of some Middle Eastern sects and in synagogues to direct the singing of liturgical songs (Hebrews probably learned cheironomy from Egyptians), and, more rarely, in some ancient Western religions.

The New Grove Dictionary of Music and Musicians comments that the method is particularly developed in traditions lacking a written notation, including Vedic, Byzantine and Roman chants.

Jewish religious cheironomy can also be found as mnemonic signs in printed Hebrew Bibles, appearing above, below and amidst the text to be sung, to guide the cantor in his rendition of Biblical readings: see Cantillation.

== See also ==
- List of gestures
