= Waving =

Hand gesture for greeting

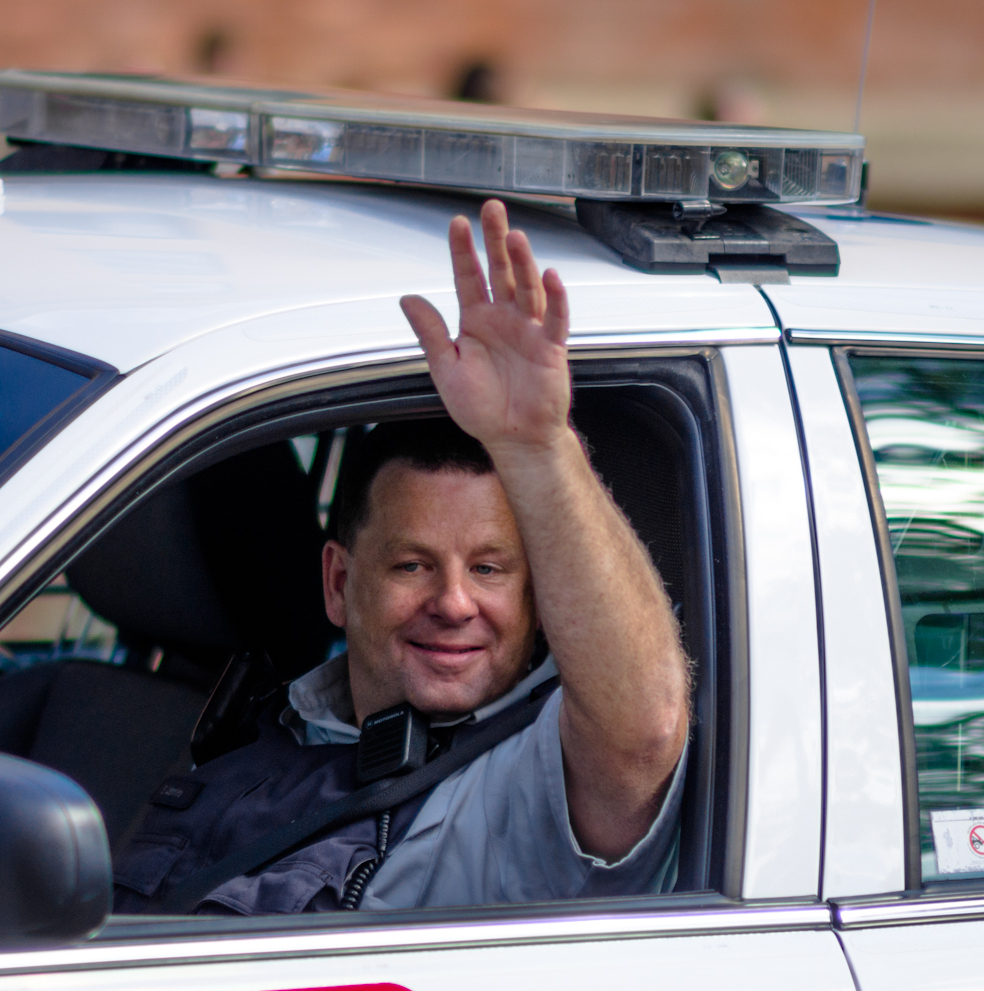
A man waving

Video of children waving

Waving is a nonverbal communication gesture that consists of the movement of the hand and/or entire arm that people commonly use to greet each other, but it can also be used to say goodbye, acknowledge another's presence, call for silence, or deny someone. The wave gesture is an essential element of human language.

== History ==
The waving of the hand is a nonverbal gesture that has an unclear origin but is said to date back to as far as the 18th century in the form of a saluting. Prior to the 18th century, knights removed the guard of their helmets to show their identity, followed with a salute to show that they came in peace; saluting is also used to show others that they are not armed with weapons and do not pose a threat. The action of saluting was formalised only in the 1780s by European armies; since then, it has become a common way of properly addressing one another in the military setting.

An alternate origin is through ASL in the 1800s, where waving handkerchiefs was a way to show approval or excitement or to call attention for deaf people, which is known as the "Chautauqua salute." It is recorded during a Canadian event in 1884 that multiple attendees forgot their handkerchief and so waved their hands in the air as a way to clap during the event. In modern days, the accepted and common way for deaf individuals to applaud is raising hands in the air and simultaneously shaking their open hand and moving their fingers back and forth.

== Deaf ==
Sign language users also wave for "hello" and "goodbye." For an ASL user, saying "goodbye" is done by repeatedly opening and closing the right hand, and it faces the receiver of the gesture. This method is used to say "goodbye" to a group of people; saying "goodbye" to an individual is done with a different method. Saying "hello" is done by the traditional waving of the right hand. "Hello" is also communicated in ASL with an open palm salute starting at the forehead and moving down to the waist. This method is used to say "hello" to a group of people, likewise with implying "goodbye", there is a different method to say "hello" to an individual.

== Components ==
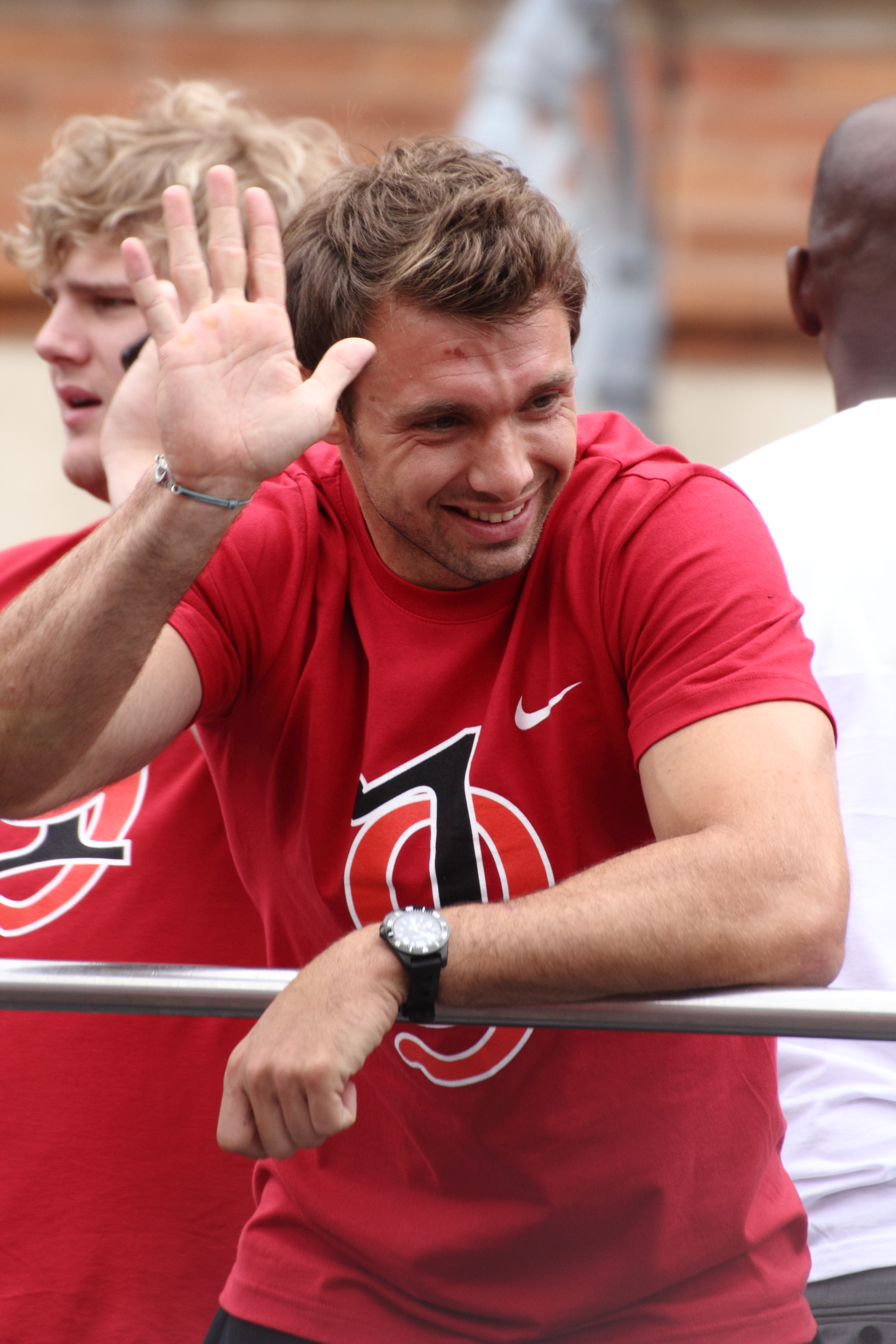
Rugby player Vincent Clerc acknowledging fans with a wave

The waving of the hand has multiple variables and styles of performing the gesture. The common waving of the hand to mean "hello" or "goodbye" is done by moving the hand side to side, but there are more than one form of waving, each form having its own meaning.

=== Variables ===
Waving has four variables: the open palm (is the palm curved or straight), the angle of the wave (big waves or short waves), the elevation of the hand (above the head or held low), and the movement pattern of the wave (sideways rotation, up and down motion, side to side motion).

=== Variations ===
There are different ways to wave the hand; some include the standard side-to-side wave, palm wide wave, wiggly wave (finger wiggle wave), "flirtatious" wave, open-and close finger wave, arm wave, and the "Miss America" wave.

People wave by raising their hand and moving it from side to side. Another common wave is to raise one's hand and repeatedly move the fingers downward toward the palm. A variant known as the wiggly wave consists of holding the hand near shoulder level and wiggling the fingers randomly. This can be used to appear cute or flirtatious to the target of the wave. The gesture can be used to attract attention at a distance. Most commonly, though, the gesture means quite simply "hello" or "goodbye".

The royal wave, also known as a regal wave, pageant wave, parade wave, or Miss America wave, is a similar but distinct kind of hand waving gesture in which a person executes something alternatively described as either a 'plastic grin' with 'fingers cupped' and 'forearm swaying side-to-side' or a "vertical hand with a slight twist from the wrist". The gesture is often performed, to various degrees, by different members of the British royal family, signaling anything from regality, class and control to elegance, restraint and character.

== Cultural interpretations ==
In Western culture, waving is a known gesture that means "hello" or "goodbye". That gesture can also be used to call the attention of someone, for example waving down a taxi, or waving at a friend from a great distance. That gesture could be interpreted differently and have a different meaning or even be highly offensive in South Korea, Nigeria, Greece, Bulgaria, Latin American countries, India, Japan, and other places.

=== African culture ===
==== Nigeria ====
In Nigeria, waving the hand with the palm facing outward in front of someone's face is highly offensive and should be avoided.

=== Asia ===
==== China ====
In China, women greet other women by waving.

==== Japan ====
In Japan, hand waving while the palm is kept outward and near the face is a gesture used to display confusion or that the individual waving does not know or understand.

=== European culture ===
Waving the hand to say "hello" or "goodbye" is done by moving the fingers down towards the wrist and back to an open palm position while keeping the palm facing out. Another way to say "goodbye" is done by wagging the fingers. That motion (wagging fingers) is also used to say "no."

==== Greece ====
In Greece, a hand gesture with the palm facing outward and the fingers fully stretched under tension is considered an insult rather than a greeting. However, a relaxed, casual wave of the hand with the palm showing is not offensive, and is instead considered a greeting.

This is offensive and dates back to the Byzantine times, when moutza would involve prisoners' faces being tainted with charcoal by their own hands and being forced to parade down town streets.

==== Ireland ====
In Ireland, the deaf use the hand wave to greet one another. Deaf women use an "open palms up half moon shape" type of wave to greet one another. Men, however, use a different way of greeting one another or women.

=== Latin America ===
In Latin American countries, people greet one another by kissing, hugging or shaking hands. Waving their hand is uncommon, but it neither has any negative representation nor causes offense.

==== Nicaragua ====
In Nicaragua, waving to someone is tolerated but does not display proper etiquette. Instead, it is common to hug, kiss, or shake hands, following with the proper time of day ("good morning", "good afternoon", or "good evening").

== See also ==
- Motorcycling greetings ("Biker wave")
