= Money gesture =

Gesture used to hint at finances

The money gesture, also known as the pay me gesture, is signalled by repeatedly rubbing one's thumb over the tip of the index finger and middle finger. The gesture resembles the act of rubbing coins or bills together and is generally used to indicate a financial topic.

== Incidents ==
Starting in 2012, American football player Johnny Manziel used the gesture to celebrate touchdowns. It has been used in a similar way by football player T. J. Yeldon and academic R. Bowen Loftin. In 2015, Manziel stopped using the gesture after his opponents often responded in kind.

In 2022, British politician James Cleverly made the money gesture to Keir Starmer, the Leader of the Opposition. He allegedly alluded to suggestions claiming the Labour Party accepts donations from trade unions.

During the 2022 FIFA World Cup, an Ecuadorian fan used the gesture against Qatar, alluding to unfair refereeing.

In 2023, Slovenian basketball player Luka Dončić was fined $35,000 for using the money gesture. Dončić rubbed his fingers together signaling that the game officials had been paid off, and the NBA found it "unprofessional and inappropriate".

== See also ==
- List of gestures
