= List of mudras =

List of mudras may refer to one of these two lists of mudras:

- List of mudras (dance)
- List of mudras (yoga)
