= Hand rubbing =

Gesture conveying meanings across cultures

Hand rubbing.

Hand rubbing is a gesture that conveys in many cultures either that one is feeling excitement, or that a person is feeling cold. In Ekman and Friesen's 1969 classification system for gestures, hand-rubbing as an indication of coldness is an emblem intentional gesture that could equally well be verbalized. As stated by Hidden Significance, rubbing our hands together defines a physical action that doesn't show much importance, but in various cultures and spiritual methods, this little gesture can hold an in-depth symbolism.

== Cultural differences ==
The gesture is widespread around the globe, although it is possibly more common in cultures of countries with colder climates than those with hotter climates. In South America, the gesture is used to imply that two women are lesbians.

Hand rubbing involves rubbing the palms of one's hands together. As a gesture of expectation, the rate at which one rubs the palms together is significant. A fast pace indicates expectation of something good for oneself. But a slow pace indicates expectation of something bad for someone else. Context also affects the meaning of the gesture. In context, the meaning can vary from an indicator of internal (anticipatory) tension to meaning "Oh good!".

=== Cultural and symbolic variations in drama ===
In drama, rubbing hands can signify various things, such as a miser rubbing his palms together over money, a villain having just done a wicked deed, or a person anticipating an upcoming event with excitement. Robert Munro's Psychological Sketch for Lady Macbeth explains her sleepwalking scene that portrays rubbing her hands in Act 5, Scene 1. It describes the wringing of her hands in anguish because of the bloodstains that will not be gone and a symbolism of her overwhelming guilt and psychological deterioration, connecting it to her mental health declining and unresolved trauma that got her to sleepwalk.

It was popularised in hip-hop and to a lesser extent in western culture by Birdman (rapper) and it became iconic in music videos for rappers to rub their hands together.

A psychological study of revenge by Robert Baron, a psychologist in the school of management at Rensselaer Polytechnic Institute, found that some people who had waited years to get even with others, plotting and waiting for the opportunity to "torpedo their enemy's career", would rub their hands together at the memory, in the fashion of cartoon villains.

John Bulwer calls Lady Macbeth's hand rubbing gesture Gestus #XI: Innocentiam Ostendo (Latin for "I display innocence"). He states that to imitate the posture of washing the hands by rubbing the back of one in the hollow of the other with a kind of detersive motion is a gesture sometimes used by those who would profess their innocence and declare they have no Hand in that foul business, not so much as by their manual assent […] for the Hands naturally imply, as it were in Hieroglyph, men's acts and operations; and that cleansing motion denotes the cleanness of their actions.". This gesture is also associated with Pilate and with Shakespeare's other plays Julius Caesar (where Brutus' hand-washing gesture is turned from a profession of innocence into a signal of guilt and Richard II.

== See also ==
- Happy Merchant, antisemitic stereotype that depicts hand rubbing
