= Talk to the hand =

English language slang phrase

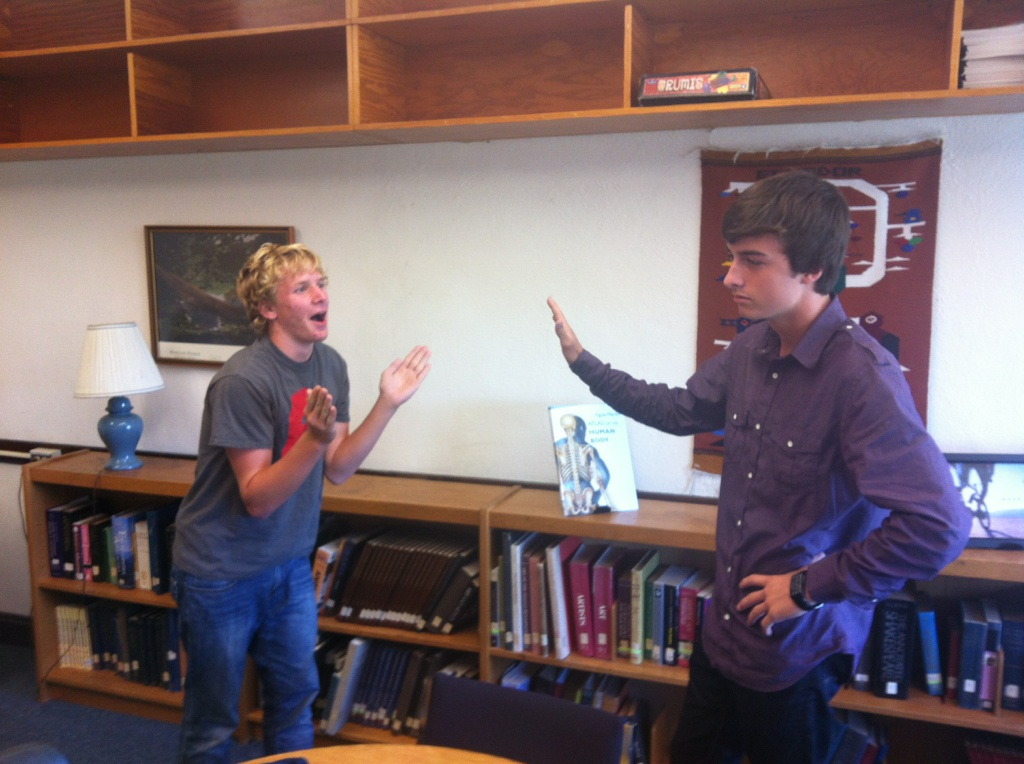
Two people demonstrate "Talk to the Hand"

"Talk to the hand" (or "tell it to the hand") is a slang phrase associated with the 1990s. It originated as a sarcastic way of saying one does not want to hear what the person who is speaking is saying.

It is often elongated to a phrase such as "Talk to the hand, because the ears ain't listening" or "Talk to the hand, because the face ain't listening."

== Meaning and usage ==
Often considered to be sarcastic or obnoxious, the phrase was popularized by actor and comedian Martin Lawrence in his 1992 sitcom Martin. It was formally reported from as early as 1995, when a local Indianapolis magazine story noted "Talk to the hand—The phrase, which means, 'Shut up', is accompanied by a hand in front of the victim's face."

It is usually accompanied by the gesture of extending one arm toward the other person, with the palm of that hand facing the person being insulted, in the manner of the gesture to stop. Use of the phrase was noted to be a passing trend, as Jack Rawlins noted in advising writers against the use of the slang: "Slang is trendy. Last year every young person I knew was saying 'Talk to the hand'. Now no one even remembers 'Talk to the hand'".

== See also ==
- Mountza
