= Akanbe =

Japanese gesture of sarcasm and taunt

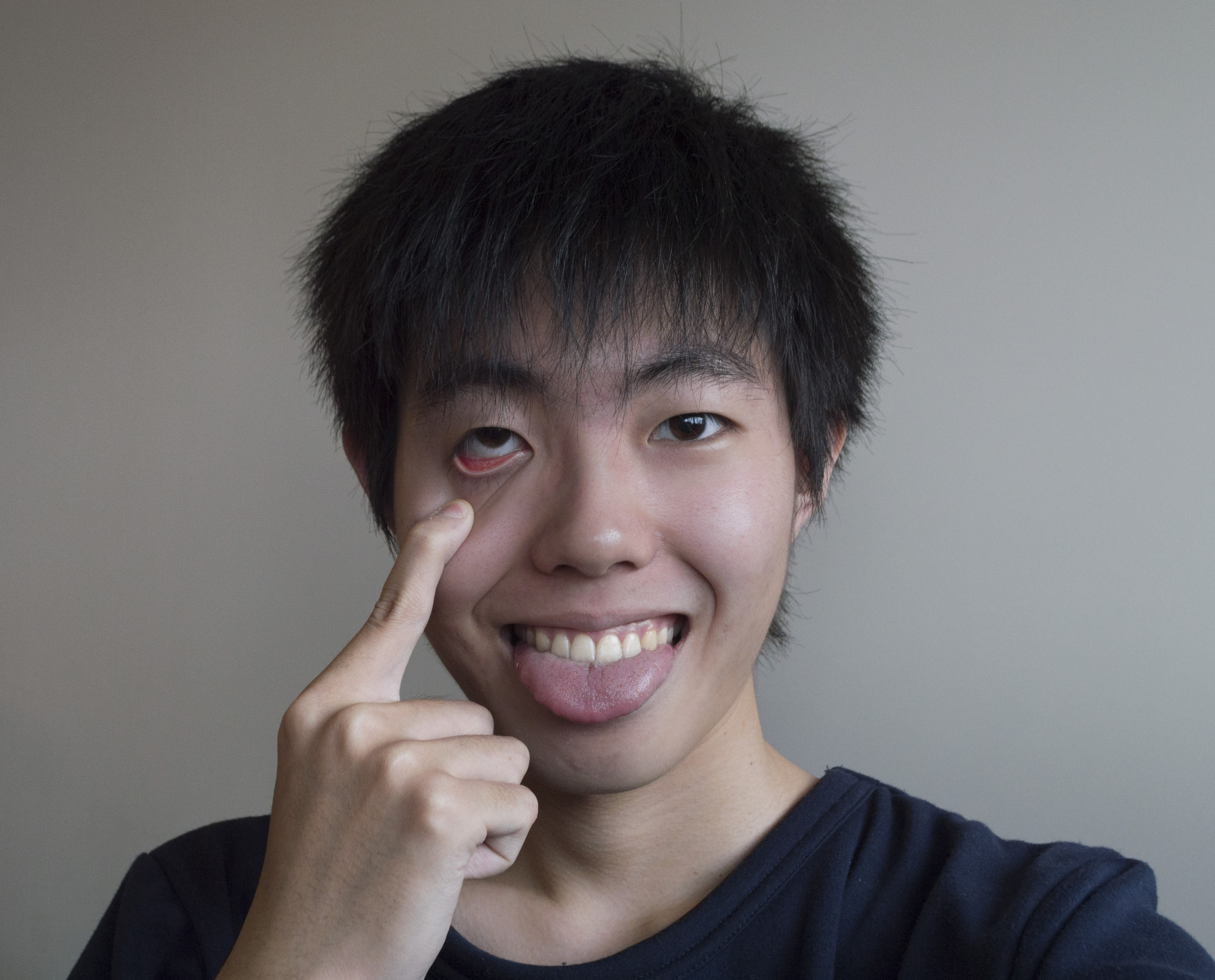
A man making the gesture

Akanbe (Japanese: あかんべえ, あっかんべえ, and あかんべえよ) is a Japanese facial expression and gesture associated with sarcasm, teasing, or mild taunting. The gesture consists of pulling down the lower eyelid to expose the reddish underside of the eye toward another person, often accompanied by sticking out the tongue. It is most commonly associated with children, though it may also appear in informal adult contexts.

In everyday use, akanbe functions as a nonverbal expression of refusal, mockery, or playful defiance. It is frequently observed in school and playground settings and may be used during informal interactions to signal disagreement without verbal confrontation. Within the framework of Japanese etiquette and broader norms of indirect communication, such gestures can convey social meaning while maintaining a relatively low level of conflict.

The term "akanbe" is also used as an interjection expressing displeasure or disapproval. In some contexts it may function as a noun referring to a person regarded as intrusive or meddlesome. As a lexical item, it is sometimes discussed alongside Japanese sound symbolism and expressive vocabulary.

Akanbe appears in Japanese popular culture, including anime, manga, and television. In visual media, the gesture is used as a shorthand to indicate teasing, annoyance, embarrassment, or disbelief. Characters may be depicted pulling down the eyelid with a finger, sometimes combined with exaggerated facial features typical of stylized animation. The gesture's repeated depiction has contributed to its recognition among audiences outside Japan.

Akanbe is sometimes compared with the eyelid pull gesture observed in other cultures. Although similar in physical form, interpretations vary, and in Japan the gesture is generally understood as childish teasing rather than a serious insult. It may also be considered alongside other forms of nonverbal communication.

== See also ==
- Eyelid pull
- Body language
- Facial expression
- Nonverbal communication
- Japanese etiquette
- Culture of Japan
