= Eyelid pull =

Gesture in which the finger is used to pull one lower eyelid further down

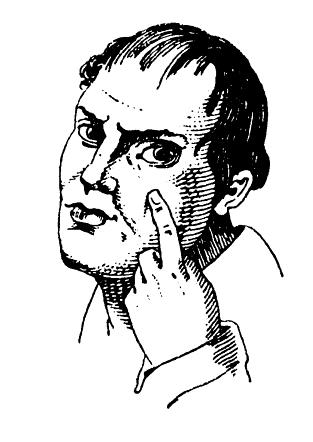
Image of man making the "eyelid pull" hand gesture, published by Di Jorio in 1832 in Naples, Italy

The eyelid pull is a gesture in which the finger is used to pull one lower eyelid further down, exposing more of the eyeball. This gesture has different meanings in different cultures, but in many cultures, particularly in the Mediterranean, signifies alertness, or a warning to be watchful. In the Italian language, one can say occhio (eye), not necessarily with the gesture, to signify the same.

In France, the gesture of pulling down one's lower eyelid and saying mon œil, or "my eye", is an expression of disdainful, dismissive disbelief. Similar variations of the gesture exist in other European countries, for example Poland or Turkey. The phrase "my eye" is an outdated expression of disbelief in the English language, although without the gesture.

== See also ==
- Akanbe, similar gesture in Japan used as a taunt or to express sarcasm
