= Puppy face =

Human facial expression

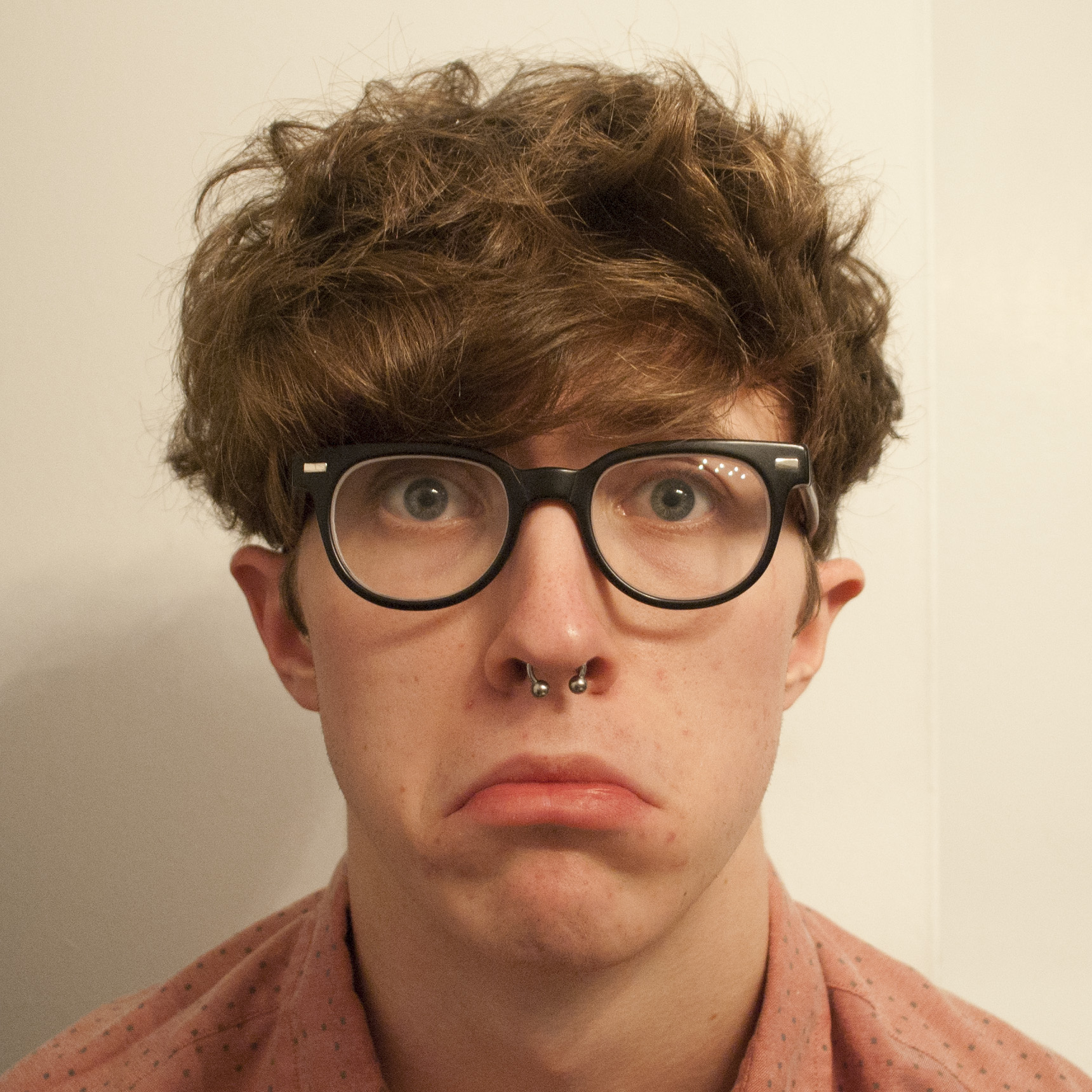
A person making a puppy face

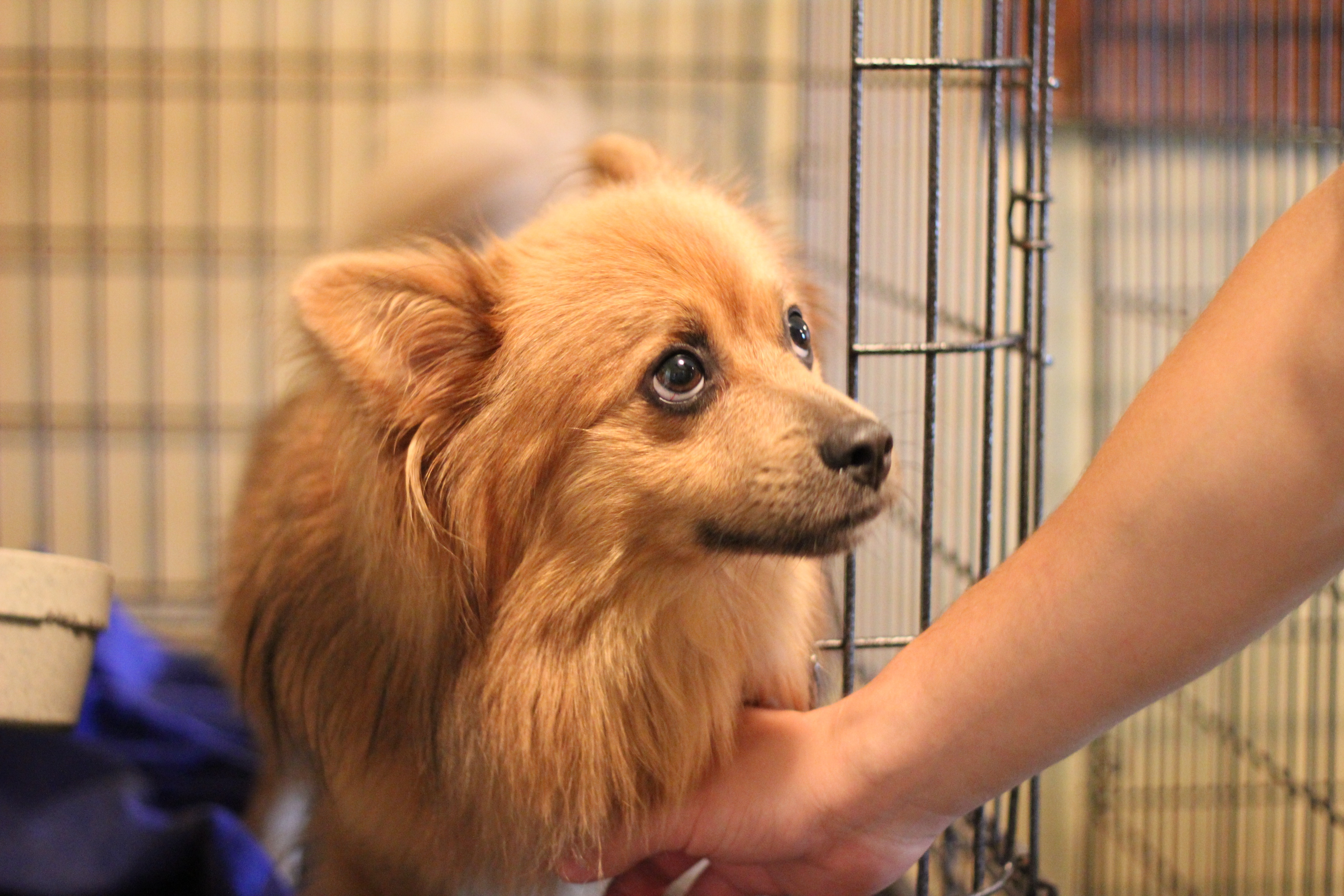
A dog with a pleading expression

A puppy face is a facial expression that humans make that is based on canine expressions. In dogs and other animals, the look is expressed when the head is tilted down and the eyes are looking up. Usually, the animal looks like it is about to cry. This gesture is sometimes performed by children in order to persuade their parents to do something special for them. Humans often open their eyes a little wide, pinch and/or raise the eyebrows, and stick the bottom lip out, while tilting their entire head slightly downward and looking upwards at the person to whom they have aimed the gesture. The head is often tilted sideways slightly.

It can be a lighthearted expression for begging or an attempt to persuade someone. Verbal approximations include: "Aw, come on!", "Please?", and "But why not?", among others.
