= Self-clasping handshake =

Gesture of victory

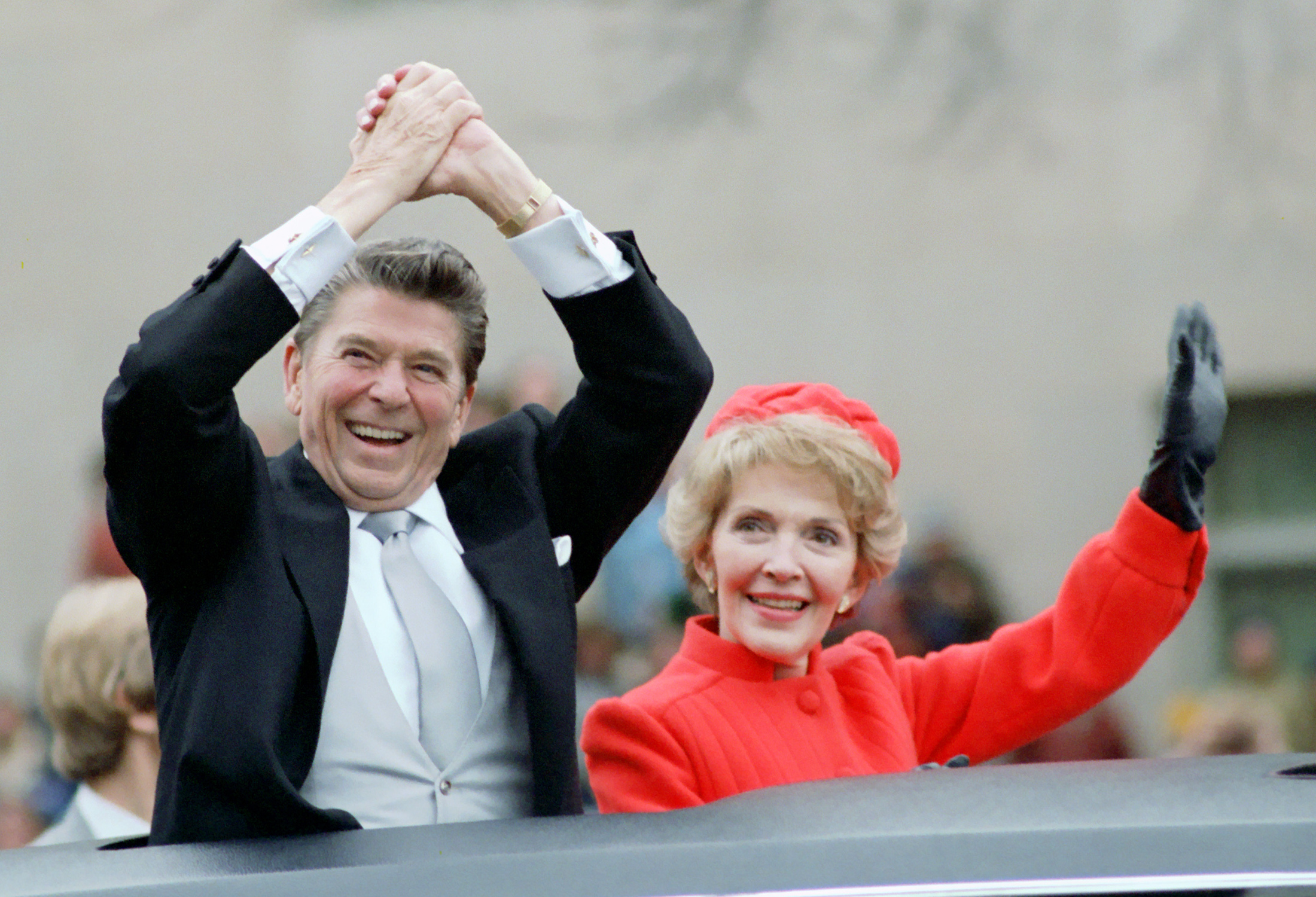
Ronald and Nancy Reagan in the president's first inauguration parade in 1981

A self-clasping handshake is a gesture in which one hand is grasped by the other and held together in front of the body or over the head. In the United States, this gesture is a sign of victory, being made by the winning boxer at the end of a fight. Leaders of the Soviet Union, such as Nikita Khrushchev, used the gesture to symbolise friendship when visiting the United States, and so risked misunderstanding.
