= Mountza =

Obscene gesture in Greece

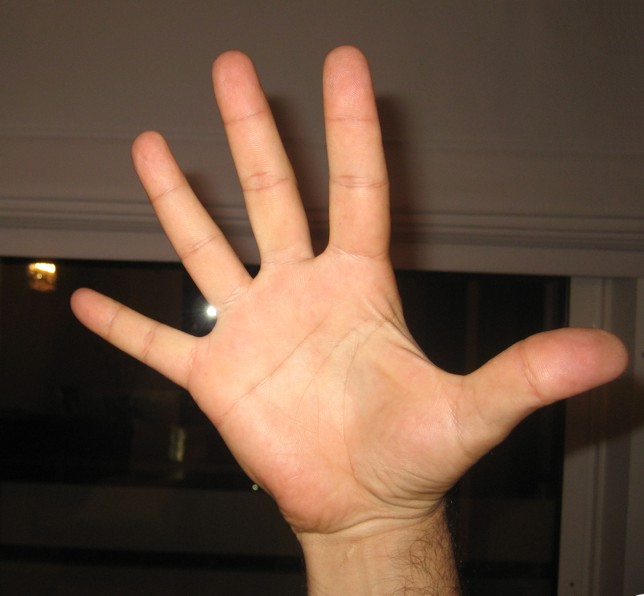
Single moutza

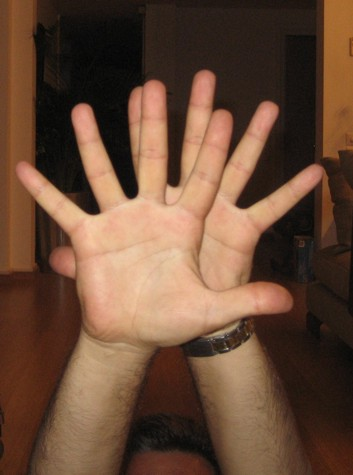
Double moutza

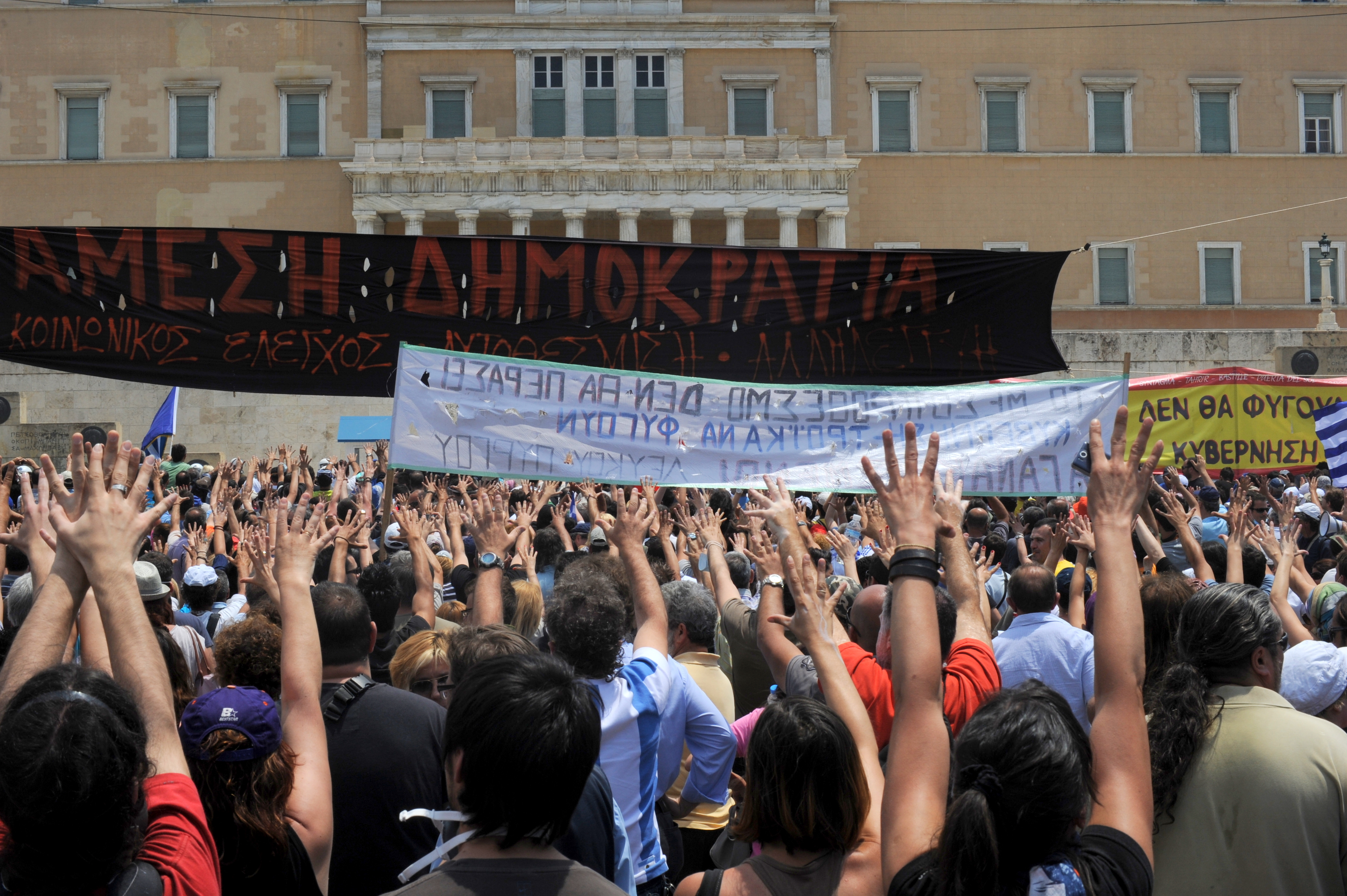
People giving moutzas to the Greek parliament during the Indignant Citizens Movement. Lower left, see double moutza, lower middle, see single moutza

A mountza or moutza (Greek: μούντζα or μούτζα [ˈmud͡za]), also called faskeloma (Greek: φασκέλωμα [faˈskeloma]), is the most traditional gesture of insult among Mexicans and Greeks. It consists of extending and spreading all fingers of the hand and presenting the palm towards the face of the person to be insulted with a forward motion.

It is often coupled with να (na, "here"), ορίστε (oríste, "there you are"), or πάρτα (par'ta, "take these"), as well as swear words. The closer the gesture is to the other person's face the more intense it is considered.

An even more offensive version is achieved by using both hands to double the gesture, smacking the palm of one hand against the back of the other in the direction of the intended recipient.

When Greeks hand-signal the number 5 to someone they take care not to overextend the fingers or face their palm towards the person, lest it be mistaken for a mountza.

== Origin ==
The origin of the gesture can be traced back to the ancient years, when it was used as a curse. It is said that even during the Eleusinian Mysteries it complemented verbal curses against evil forces. The ancient name φασκέλωμα (faskéloma), alongside its variant φάσκελo (fáskelo), survives to this day as a synonym.

In later years, the name changed to mountza. In the penal code of the Byzantine Empire one punishment entailed criminals paraded around town sitting backwards on a donkey with their face smeared with cinder (μούντζος, moútzos) to enhance their ridicule.

Because cinder was wiped on the person's face first by collecting it in the palm and then by extending open the fingers, the gesture itself became insulting, to be known as mountza, after the name of the material applied. The modern Greek word mountzoura (μουντζούρα) or moutzoura (μουτζούρα) for a smudge, scribble or dark stain has the same origin.

== Around the world ==
The gesture of mountza does not have the same significance in other cultures around the world. In a few countries there are similar gestures. Their significances are:

- In Armenia, abruptly thrusting the palm of the hand to someone means "Curse you", but can also mean "Can't stand you anymore" if performed by a close female relative or friend (mostly mother or grandmother).
- In Iraqi and Assyrian culture, abruptly pushing the palm of the hand towards someone means they are worthy of shame and are dishonorable.
- In Pakistan, the showing of the palm to someone in a thrusting manner is also considered an insult. This gesture is called buja in Sindhi language. In Punjab, it is considered as giving a curse (la'anat).
- In the Persian Gulf region, showing the palms of both hands to someone after clapping them is also considered an insult, together with saying Malat Alaik. It is usually done by women as it is considered not manly if men do it.
- Since the 1990s in North America, a similar gesture is used in "Talk to the hand". By showing the palm of the hand, with fingers spread, and saying "Talk to the hand... because the face ain't listenin'" is the equivalent of "You're wasting your breath" or "Shut up".
- Both in Mexico and Brazil, it can be commonly used to say hi (together with waving); But, when steady or moving it repeatedly towards the receiver, in Mexico, it means "you'll see" (Spanish: vas a ver/ya verás/ya lo verás), warning that the giver will tell an authority figure (parent, teacher, principal, etc.) about any prank or other mischievous action the receiver has done (being commonly used with children to scare them into behaving), while, in Brazil, it constitutes a request for patience, especially regarding the fulfillment of any request or listening, commonly meaning "wait a minute" (Portuguese: espere um minuto/momento/pouquinho/segundo).
- In Nigeria, this can be viewed as offensive in particular tribes and is usually accompanied with the use of the expletive uwar ka, meaning "your mother" in Hausa.
- In Spain, football fans use this gesture as a mockery towards rival fans, when their team has scored five goals (as many goals as the fingers of a hand). This is called a "hand" (mano, in Spanish) The 5-0, or 0-5, result, is also called a mano by extension.
- In Panama, in addition to meaning the same as in Mexico, it is also used to threaten the receiver (implying that they will be punished or be the target of violence or any other form of retribution) at a later and more appropriate/convenient time (often when there is less risk of getting caught in the case of physical retribution or attack). This is because aside from implying/saying the words Vas a ver! to the receiver, the word Espérate (colloq. 'pérate) meaning wait, is also used often since the gesture also has the general meaning of wait/hold on as in many other parts of the world.
- In Chicago, the moutza was used on a mock "city sticker" in 2012 following a controversy over design ideas for an official city parking sticker honoring first responders. In the spoof sticker, the moutza is displayed with the middle finger cut off to represent Chicago's mayor, Rahm Emanuel, who lost part of his middle finger while cutting roast beef in high school.

== Bibliography ==
- Phaedon Koukoules, "Life and culture of the Byzantines", addendum 5, 1986
