= Supplemental Symbols and Pictographs =

Unicode block containing emoji

- Range: U+1F900..U+1F9FF (256 code points)
- Plane: SMP
- Scripts: Common
- Symbol sets: Emoji; Typikon symbols
- Assigned: 256 code points
- Unused: 0 reserved code points

Unicode Version History
- 8.0 (2015): 15 (+15)
- 9.0 (2016): 82 (+67)
- 10.0 (2017): 148 (+66)
- 11.0 (2018): 213 (+65)
- 12.0 (2019): 244 (+31)
- 13.0 (2020): 254 (+10)
- 14.0 (2021): 256 (+2)

Unicode documentation
- Code chart ∣ Web page

Supplemental Symbols and Pictographs is a Unicode block containing emoji characters. This block extends the set of symbols included in the Miscellaneous Symbols and Pictographs block. It also includes Typikon symbols.

== Chart ==
Supplemental Symbols and Pictographs^{[1]} Official Unicode Consortium code chart (PDF)
| | 0 | 1 | 2 | 3 | 4 | 5 | 6 | 7 | 8 | 9 | A | B | C | D | E | F |
| U+1F90x | 🤀 | 🤁 | 🤂 | 🤃 | 🤄 | 🤅 | 🤆 | 🤇 | 🤈 | 🤉 | 🤊 | 🤋 | 🤌 | 🤍 | 🤎 | 🤏 |
| U+1F91x | 🤐 | 🤑 | 🤒 | 🤓 | 🤔 | 🤕 | 🤖 | 🤗 | 🤘 | 🤙 | 🤚 | 🤛 | 🤜 | 🤝 | 🤞 | 🤟 |
| U+1F92x | 🤠 | 🤡 | 🤢 | 🤣 | 🤤 | 🤥 | 🤦 | 🤧 | 🤨 | 🤩 | 🤪 | 🤫 | 🤬 | 🤭 | 🤮 | 🤯 |
| U+1F93x | 🤰 | 🤱 | 🤲 | 🤳 | 🤴 | 🤵 | 🤶 | 🤷 | 🤸 | 🤹 | 🤺 | 🤻 | 🤼 | 🤽 | 🤾 | 🤿 |
| U+1F94x | 🥀 | 🥁 | 🥂 | 🥃 | 🥄 | 🥅 | 🥆 | 🥇 | 🥈 | 🥉 | 🥊 | 🥋 | 🥌 | 🥍 | 🥎 | 🥏 |
| U+1F95x | 🥐 | 🥑 | 🥒 | 🥓 | 🥔 | 🥕 | 🥖 | 🥗 | 🥘 | 🥙 | 🥚 | 🥛 | 🥜 | 🥝 | 🥞 | 🥟 |
| U+1F96x | 🥠 | 🥡 | 🥢 | 🥣 | 🥤 | 🥥 | 🥦 | 🥧 | 🥨 | 🥩 | 🥪 | 🥫 | 🥬 | 🥭 | 🥮 | 🥯 |
| U+1F97x | 🥰 | 🥱 | 🥲 | 🥳 | 🥴 | 🥵 | 🥶 | 🥷 | 🥸 | 🥹 | 🥺 | 🥻 | 🥼 | 🥽 | 🥾 | 🥿 |
| U+1F98x | 🦀 | 🦁 | 🦂 | 🦃 | 🦄 | 🦅 | 🦆 | 🦇 | 🦈 | 🦉 | 🦊 | 🦋 | 🦌 | 🦍 | 🦎 | 🦏 |
| U+1F99x | 🦐 | 🦑 | 🦒 | 🦓 | 🦔 | 🦕 | 🦖 | 🦗 | 🦘 | 🦙 | 🦚 | 🦛 | 🦜 | 🦝 | 🦞 | 🦟 |
| U+1F9Ax | 🦠 | 🦡 | 🦢 | 🦣 | 🦤 | 🦥 | 🦦 | 🦧 | 🦨 | 🦩 | 🦪 | 🦫 | 🦬 | 🦭 | 🦮 | 🦯 |
| U+1F9Bx | 🦰 | 🦱 | 🦲 | 🦳 | 🦴 | 🦵 | 🦶 | 🦷 | 🦸 | 🦹 | 🦺 | 🦻 | 🦼 | 🦽 | 🦾 | 🦿 |
| U+1F9Cx | 🧀 | 🧁 | 🧂 | 🧃 | 🧄 | 🧅 | 🧆 | 🧇 | 🧈 | 🧉 | 🧊 | 🧋 | 🧌 | 🧍 | 🧎 | 🧏 |
| U+1F9Dx | 🧐 | 🧑 | 🧒 | 🧓 | 🧔 | 🧕 | 🧖 | 🧗 | 🧘 | 🧙 | 🧚 | 🧛 | 🧜 | 🧝 | 🧞 | 🧟 |
| U+1F9Ex | 🧠 | 🧡 | 🧢 | 🧣 | 🧤 | 🧥 | 🧦 | 🧧 | 🧨 | 🧩 | 🧪 | 🧫 | 🧬 | 🧭 | 🧮 | 🧯 |
| U+1F9Fx | 🧰 | 🧱 | 🧲 | 🧳 | 🧴 | 🧵 | 🧶 | 🧷 | 🧸 | 🧹 | 🧺 | 🧻 | 🧼 | 🧽 | 🧾 | 🧿 |
Notes 1.As of Unicode version 17.0

== Emoji ==
The Unicode 14.0 Supplemental Symbols and Pictographs block contains 242 emoji, consisting of all the non-Typikon symbols except for the rifle and the pentathlon symbol. The rifle and the pentathlon emoji have been rejected due to their controversy, analogous to the redesign of the pistol emoji.

- U+1F90C – U+1F93A
- U+1F93C – U+1F945
- U+1F947 – U+1F9FF

== Emoji modifiers ==
The Supplemental Symbols and Pictographs block has 46 emoji that represent people or body parts. These are designed to be used with the set of "Emoji modifiers" defined in the Miscellaneous Symbols and Pictographs block. These are modifier characters intended to define the skin colour to be used for the emoji, based on the Fitzpatrick scale:

- U+1F3FB EMOJI MODIFIER FITZPATRICK TYPE-1-2
- U+1F3FC EMOJI MODIFIER FITZPATRICK TYPE-3
- U+1F3FD EMOJI MODIFIER FITZPATRICK TYPE-4
- U+1F3FE EMOJI MODIFIER FITZPATRICK TYPE-5
- U+1F3FF EMOJI MODIFIER FITZPATRICK TYPE-6

The following table shows the full combinations of the "human emoji" characters with each of the five modifiers, which should display each character in each of the five skin tones provided a suitable font is installed on the system and the rendering software is capable of handling modifier characters:

Human emoji
| U+ | 1F90C | 1F90F | 1F918 | 1F919 | 1F91A | 1F91B | 1F91C | 1F91D | 1F91E | 1F91F | 1F926 | 1F930 |
| emoji | 🤌 | 🤏 | 🤘 | 🤙 | 🤚 | 🤛 | 🤜 | 🤝 | 🤞 | 🤟 | 🤦 | 🤰 |
| FITZ-1-2 | 🤌🏻 | 🤏🏻 | 🤘🏻 | 🤙🏻 | 🤚🏻 | 🤛🏻 | 🤜🏻 | 🤝🏻 | 🤞🏻 | 🤟🏻 | 🤦🏻 | 🤰🏻 |
| FITZ-3 | 🤌🏼 | 🤏🏼 | 🤘🏼 | 🤙🏼 | 🤚🏼 | 🤛🏼 | 🤜🏼 | 🤝🏼 | 🤞🏼 | 🤟🏼 | 🤦🏼 | 🤰🏼 |
| FITZ-4 | 🤌🏽 | 🤏🏽 | 🤘🏽 | 🤙🏽 | 🤚🏽 | 🤛🏽 | 🤜🏽 | 🤝🏽 | 🤞🏽 | 🤟🏽 | 🤦🏽 | 🤰🏽 |
| FITZ-5 | 🤌🏾 | 🤏🏾 | 🤘🏾 | 🤙🏾 | 🤚🏾 | 🤛🏾 | 🤜🏾 | 🤝🏾 | 🤞🏾 | 🤟🏾 | 🤦🏾 | 🤰🏾 |
| FITZ-6 | 🤌🏿 | 🤏🏿 | 🤘🏿 | 🤙🏿 | 🤚🏿 | 🤛🏿 | 🤜🏿 | 🤝🏿 | 🤞🏿 | 🤟🏿 | 🤦🏿 | 🤰🏿 |
| U+ | 1F931 | 1F932 | 1F933 | 1F934 | 1F935 | 1F936 | 1F937 | 1F938 | 1F939 | 1F93C | 1F93D | 1F93E |
| emoji | 🤱 | 🤲 | 🤳 | 🤴 | 🤵 | 🤶 | 🤷 | 🤸 | 🤹 | 🤼 | 🤽 | 🤾 |
| FITZ-1-2 | 🤱🏻 | 🤲🏻 | 🤳🏻 | 🤴🏻 | 🤵🏻 | 🤶🏻 | 🤷🏻 | 🤸🏻 | 🤹🏻 | 🤼🏻 | 🤽🏻 | 🤾🏻 |
| FITZ-3 | 🤱🏼 | 🤲🏼 | 🤳🏼 | 🤴🏼 | 🤵🏼 | 🤶🏼 | 🤷🏼 | 🤸🏼 | 🤹🏼 | 🤼🏼 | 🤽🏼 | 🤾🏼 |
| FITZ-4 | 🤱🏽 | 🤲🏽 | 🤳🏽 | 🤴🏽 | 🤵🏽 | 🤶🏽 | 🤷🏽 | 🤸🏽 | 🤹🏽 | 🤼🏽 | 🤽🏽 | 🤾🏽 |
| FITZ-5 | 🤱🏾 | 🤲🏾 | 🤳🏾 | 🤴🏾 | 🤵🏾 | 🤶🏾 | 🤷🏾 | 🤸🏾 | 🤹🏾 | 🤼🏾 | 🤽🏾 | 🤾🏾 |
| FITZ-6 | 🤱🏿 | 🤲🏿 | 🤳🏿 | 🤴🏿 | 🤵🏿 | 🤶🏿 | 🤷🏿 | 🤸🏿 | 🤹🏿 | 🤼🏿 | 🤽🏿 | 🤾🏿 |
| U+ | 1F977 | 1F9B5 | 1F9B6 | 1F9B8 | 1F9B9 | 1F9BB | 1F9CD | 1F9CE | 1F9CF | 1F9D1 | 1F9D2 | 1F9D3 |
| emoji | 🥷 | 🦵 | 🦶 | 🦸 | 🦹 | 🦻 | 🧍 | 🧎 | 🧏 | 🧑 | 🧒 | 🧓 |
| FITZ-1-2 | 🥷🏻 | 🦵🏻 | 🦶🏻 | 🦸🏻 | 🦹🏻 | 🦻🏻 | 🧍🏻 | 🧎🏻 | 🧏🏻 | 🧑🏻 | 🧒🏻 | 🧓🏻 |
| FITZ-3 | 🥷🏼 | 🦵🏼 | 🦶🏼 | 🦸🏼 | 🦹🏼 | 🦻🏼 | 🧍🏼 | 🧎🏼 | 🧏🏼 | 🧑🏼 | 🧒🏼 | 🧓🏼 |
| FITZ-4 | 🥷🏽 | 🦵🏽 | 🦶🏽 | 🦸🏽 | 🦹🏽 | 🦻🏽 | 🧍🏽 | 🧎🏽 | 🧏🏽 | 🧑🏽 | 🧒🏽 | 🧓🏽 |
| FITZ-5 | 🥷🏾 | 🦵🏾 | 🦶🏾 | 🦸🏾 | 🦹🏾 | 🦻🏾 | 🧍🏾 | 🧎🏾 | 🧏🏾 | 🧑🏾 | 🧒🏾 | 🧓🏾 |
| FITZ-6 | 🥷🏿 | 🦵🏿 | 🦶🏿 | 🦸🏿 | 🦹🏿 | 🦻🏿 | 🧍🏿 | 🧎🏿 | 🧏🏿 | 🧑🏿 | 🧒🏿 | 🧓🏿 |
| U+ | 1F9D4 | 1F9D5 | 1F9D6 | 1F9D7 | 1F9D8 | 1F9D9 | 1F9DA | 1F9DB | 1F9DC | 1F9DD | | |
| emoji | 🧔 | 🧕 | 🧖 | 🧗 | 🧘 | 🧙 | 🧚 | 🧛 | 🧜 | 🧝 | | |
| FITZ-1-2 | 🧔🏻 | 🧕🏻 | 🧖🏻 | 🧗🏻 | 🧘🏻 | 🧙🏻 | 🧚🏻 | 🧛🏻 | 🧜🏻 | 🧝🏻 | | |
| FITZ-3 | 🧔🏼 | 🧕🏼 | 🧖🏼 | 🧗🏼 | 🧘🏼 | 🧙🏼 | 🧚🏼 | 🧛🏼 | 🧜🏼 | 🧝🏼 | | |
| FITZ-4 | 🧔🏽 | 🧕🏽 | 🧖🏽 | 🧗🏽 | 🧘🏽 | 🧙🏽 | 🧚🏽 | 🧛🏽 | 🧜🏽 | 🧝🏽 | | |
| FITZ-5 | 🧔🏾 | 🧕🏾 | 🧖🏾 | 🧗🏾 | 🧘🏾 | 🧙🏾 | 🧚🏾 | 🧛🏾 | 🧜🏾 | 🧝🏾 | | |
| FITZ-6 | 🧔🏿 | 🧕🏿 | 🧖🏿 | 🧗🏿 | 🧘🏿 | 🧙🏿 | 🧚🏿 | 🧛🏿 | 🧜🏿 | 🧝🏿 | | |

Additional human emoji can be found in other Unicode blocks: Dingbats, Emoticons, Miscellaneous Symbols, Miscellaneous Symbols and Pictographs, Symbols and Pictographs Extended-A and Transport and Map Symbols.

== History ==
The following Unicode-related documents record the purpose and process of defining specific characters in the Supplemental Symbols and Pictographs block:

| Version | Final code points (Note: Proposed code points and characters names may differ from final code points and names) | Count | L2 ID | WG2 ID | Document |
|---|---|---|---|---|---|
| 8.0 | U+1F910..1F918, 1F980..1F984, 1F9C0 | 15 | L2/12-296 | | Edberg, Peter (2012-08-02), Four new emoticons |
| 8.0 | U+1F910..1F918, 1F980..1F984, 1F9C0 | 15 | L2/14-174R | | Davis, Mark; Edberg, Peter (2014-08-27), Emoji Additions |
| 8.0 | U+1F910..1F918, 1F980..1F984, 1F9C0 | 15 | L2/14-172R | | Davis, Mark; Edberg, Peter (2014-08-29), Proposed enhancements for emoji characters: background |
| 8.0 | U+1F910..1F918, 1F980..1F984, 1F9C0 | 15 | L2/14-275 | | Edberg, Peter; et al. (2014-10-23), Emoji ad-hoc committee recommendations to UTC #141 |
| 8.0 | U+1F910..1F918, 1F980..1F984, 1F9C0 | 15 | L2/14-272R2 | | Edberg, Peter; Davis, Mark (2014-10-28), Emoji Additions: Popular requests |
| 8.0 | U+1F910..1F918, 1F980..1F984, 1F9C0 | 15 | L2/15-025 | N4654 | Anderson, Deborah (2014-10-30), Future Additions to ISO/IEC 10646 |
| 8.0 | U+1F910..1F918, 1F980..1F984, 1F9C0 | 15 | L2/15-030 | | Davis, Mark (2015-01-29), Emojipedia top requests |
| 8.0 | U+1F910..1F918, 1F980..1F984, 1F9C0 | 15 | L2/16-036 | | Davis, Mark (2016-01-24), Nameslist.txt suggestions |
| 8.0 | U+1F910..1F918, 1F980..1F984, 1F9C0 | 15 | L2/17-161 | N4794 | Suignard, Michel (2017-05-08), "Ireland E15", Draft disposition of comments on PDAM1.2 to ISO/IEC 10646 5th edition |
| 9.0 | U+1F919..1F91E, 1F920..1F926, 1F930, 1F933..1F937, 1F940, 1F942, 1F950..1F955, 1F985..1F98A | 33 | L2/14-085 | | Parrott, Katrina (2014-04-09), Request Approval to add "Our New iDiversicons: Diverse Emoji Characters" to the next updated Unicode Standard |
| 9.0 | U+1F919..1F91E, 1F920..1F926, 1F930, 1F933..1F937, 1F940, 1F942, 1F950..1F955, 1F985..1F98A | 33 | L2/14-154R | | Parrott, Katrina; Afshar, Shervin (2014-08-05), Report on Diversity Emoji Use in iDiversicons and Proposal to Add New Emoji from iDiversicons Collection to Unicode |
| 9.0 | U+1F919..1F91E, 1F920..1F926, 1F930, 1F933..1F937, 1F940, 1F942, 1F950..1F955, 1F985..1F98A | 33 | L2/14-174R | | Davis, Mark; Edberg, Peter (2014-08-27), Emoji Additions |
| 9.0 | U+1F919..1F91E, 1F920..1F926, 1F930, 1F933..1F937, 1F940, 1F942, 1F950..1F955, 1F985..1F98A | 33 | L2/14-172R | | Davis, Mark; Edberg, Peter (2014-08-29), Proposed enhancements for emoji characters: background |
| 9.0 | U+1F919..1F91E, 1F920..1F926, 1F930, 1F933..1F937, 1F940, 1F942, 1F950..1F955, 1F985..1F98A | 33 | L2/14-275 | | Edberg, Peter; et al. (2014-10-23), Emoji ad-hoc committee recommendations to UTC #141 |
| 9.0 | U+1F919..1F91E, 1F920..1F926, 1F930, 1F933..1F937, 1F940, 1F942, 1F950..1F955, 1F985..1F98A | 33 | L2/14-282 | | Parrott, Katrina (2014-10-28), iDiversicons Proposed Emoji Additions Extracted from L2/14-154R |
| 9.0 | U+1F919..1F91E, 1F920..1F926, 1F930, 1F933..1F937, 1F940, 1F942, 1F950..1F955, 1F985..1F98A | 33 | L2/15-030 | | Davis, Mark (2015-01-29), Emojipedia top requests |
| 9.0 | U+1F919..1F91E, 1F920..1F926, 1F930, 1F933..1F937, 1F940, 1F942, 1F950..1F955, 1F985..1F98A | 33 | L2/15-048 | | Parrott, Katrina; et al. (2015-01-31), Adding gender counterparts to emoji list? |
| 9.0 | U+1F919..1F91E, 1F920..1F926, 1F930, 1F933..1F937, 1F940, 1F942, 1F950..1F955, 1F985..1F98A | 33 | L2/15-061 | | Cummings, Craig (2015-01-31), Emoji Additions: Runner-ups |
| 9.0 | U+1F919..1F91E, 1F920..1F926, 1F930, 1F933..1F937, 1F940, 1F942, 1F950..1F955, 1F985..1F98A | 33 | L2/15-058 | | Afshar, Shervin (2015-02-01), Comparing MSN Messenger Smiley Set to Unicode Emoji |
| 9.0 | U+1F919..1F91E, 1F920..1F926, 1F930, 1F933..1F937, 1F940, 1F942, 1F950..1F955, 1F985..1F98A | 33 | L2/15-059 | | Afshar, Shervin (2015-02-01), Comparing Yahoo Messenger Smiley Set to Unicode Emoji |
| 9.0 | U+1F919..1F91E, 1F920..1F926, 1F930, 1F933..1F937, 1F940, 1F942, 1F950..1F955, 1F985..1F98A | 33 | L2/15-054R5 | | Cummings, Craig (2015-05-08), Emoji Additions: Animals, Compatibility, and More Popular Requests |
| 9.0 | U+1F919..1F91E, 1F920..1F926, 1F930, 1F933..1F937, 1F940, 1F942, 1F950..1F955, 1F985..1F98A | 33 | L2/15-107 | | Moore, Lisa (2015-05-12), "E.1.4", UTC #143 Minutes |
| 9.0 | U+1F919..1F91E, 1F920..1F926, 1F930, 1F933..1F937, 1F940, 1F942, 1F950..1F955, 1F985..1F98A | 33 | L2/15-273 | | The name of U+1F91E, 2015-10-29 |
| 9.0 | U+1F919..1F91E, 1F920..1F926, 1F930, 1F933..1F937, 1F940, 1F942, 1F950..1F955, 1F985..1F98A | 33 | L2/15-254 | | Moore, Lisa (2015-11-16), "E.1.5", UTC #145 Minutes |
| 9.0 | U+1F919..1F91E, 1F920..1F926, 1F930, 1F933..1F937, 1F940, 1F942, 1F950..1F955, 1F985..1F98A | 33 | L2/16-203 | | Moore, Lisa (2016-08-18), "E.1.3.1", UTC #148 Minutes |
| 9.0 | U+1F919..1F91E, 1F920..1F926, 1F930, 1F933..1F937, 1F940, 1F942, 1F950..1F955, 1F985..1F98A | 33 | L2/16-332 | | Edberg, Peter; et al. (2016-11-04), Remove multi-person emoji from Emoji_Modifier_Base |
| 9.0 | U+1F919..1F91E, 1F920..1F926, 1F930, 1F933..1F937, 1F940, 1F942, 1F950..1F955, 1F985..1F98A | 33 | L2/16-333 | | Edberg, Peter; et al. (2016-11-04), SELFIE with people/gender |
| 9.0 | U+1F919..1F91E, 1F920..1F926, 1F930, 1F933..1F937, 1F940, 1F942, 1F950..1F955, 1F985..1F98A | 33 | L2/16-325 | | Moore, Lisa (2016-11-18), "Consensus 149-C13", UTC #149 Minutes |
| 9.0 | U+1F919..1F91E, 1F920..1F926, 1F930, 1F933..1F937, 1F940, 1F942, 1F950..1F955, 1F985..1F98A | 33 | L2/17-071 | | Davis, Mark (2017-03-14), Gender-Neutral Human-Form Emoji |
| 9.0 | U+1F919..1F91E, 1F920..1F926, 1F930, 1F933..1F937, 1F940, 1F942, 1F950..1F955, 1F985..1F98A | 33 | L2/17-161 | N4794 | Suignard, Michel (2017-05-08), "Ireland E19 and E24", Draft disposition of comments on PDAM1.2 to ISO/IEC 10646 5th edition |
| 9.0 | U+1F919..1F91E, 1F920..1F926, 1F930, 1F933..1F937, 1F940, 1F942, 1F950..1F955, 1F985..1F98A | 33 | L2/17-232 | | Buff, Charlotte (2017-06-28), Proposal for Fully Gender-Inclusive Emoji |
| 9.0 | U+1F919..1F91E, 1F920..1F926, 1F930, 1F933..1F937, 1F940, 1F942, 1F950..1F955, 1F985..1F98A | 33 | L2/17-287 | | Davis, Mark; Edberg, Peter (2017-08-08), "Gender Sign Sequences", Recommendations from ESC for 2018, part 2 |
| 9.0 | U+1F919..1F91E, 1F920..1F926, 1F930, 1F933..1F937, 1F940, 1F942, 1F950..1F955, 1F985..1F98A | 33 | L2/18-307 | | "New ZWJ Sequences", ESC Recommendations for 2018Q4 UTC, 2018-09-18 |
| 9.0 | U+1F919..1F91E, 1F920..1F926, 1F930, 1F933..1F937, 1F940, 1F942, 1F950..1F955, 1F985..1F98A | 33 | L2/18-272 | | Moore, Lisa (2018-10-29), "Consensus 157-C10", UTC #157 Minutes, "Change the representation of 55 RGI ZWJ sequences for people holding hands in Emoji 12.0 to the sequences listed in Appendix A of document L2/18-307." |
| 9.0 | U+1F919..1F91E, 1F920..1F926, 1F930, 1F933..1F937, 1F940, 1F942, 1F950..1F955, 1F985..1F98A | 33 | L2/19-275R2 | | Edberg, Peter; Holbrook, Ned (2019-08-27), Alternate ZWJ sequences for women/men holding hands |
| 9.0 | U+1F919..1F91E, 1F920..1F926, 1F930, 1F933..1F937, 1F940, 1F942, 1F950..1F955, 1F985..1F98A | 33 | L2/19-231R | | Daniel, Jennifer (2019-07-23), Recommendations for Gendered Emoji ZWJ Sequences for Unicode 13.0, Phase 2 |
| 9.0 | U+1F919..1F91E, 1F920..1F926, 1F930, 1F933..1F937, 1F940, 1F942, 1F950..1F955, 1F985..1F98A | 33 | L2/19-270 | | Moore, Lisa (2019-10-07), "E.1.1.1 and E.1.3.5", UTC #160 Minutes |
| 9.0 | U+1F927, 1F939, 1F941, 1F943..1F944, 1F956..1F959, 1F98B..1F98F | 14 | L2/14-092 | | Berman, Kenneth (2014-04-23), Proposal to add a Gorilla Glyph to the UCS |
| 9.0 | U+1F927, 1F939, 1F941, 1F943..1F944, 1F956..1F959, 1F98B..1F98F | 14 | L2/14-129 | | Anderson, Deborah; Whistler, Ken; McGowan, Rick; Pournader, Roozbeh (2014-05-02), "10", Recommendations to UTC #139 May 2014 on Script Proposals |
| 9.0 | U+1F927, 1F939, 1F941, 1F943..1F944, 1F956..1F959, 1F98B..1F98F | 14 | L2/15-061 | | Cummings, Craig (2015-01-31), Emoji Additions: Runner-ups |
| 9.0 | U+1F927, 1F939, 1F941, 1F943..1F944, 1F956..1F959, 1F98B..1F98F | 14 | L2/15-084 | | Zierer, Maximilian (2015-02-17), Proposal to include the Döner Kebab Emoji |
| 9.0 | U+1F927, 1F939, 1F941, 1F943..1F944, 1F956..1F959, 1F98B..1F98F | 14 | L2/15-195R2 | | Emoji Additions Tranche 6: More Popular Requests and Gap Filling, 2015-07-28 |
| 9.0 | U+1F927, 1F939, 1F941, 1F943..1F944, 1F956..1F959, 1F98B..1F98F | 14 | L2/15-187 | | Moore, Lisa (2015-08-11), "E.1.1", UTC #144 Minutes |
| 9.0 | U+1F927, 1F939, 1F941, 1F943..1F944, 1F956..1F959, 1F98B..1F98F | 14 | | N4739 | "M64.06", Unconfirmed minutes of WG 2 meeting 64, 2016-08-31 |
| 9.0 | U+1F927, 1F939, 1F941, 1F943..1F944, 1F956..1F959, 1F98B..1F98F | 14 | L2/16-281 | | Burge, Jeremy; Hunt, Paul (2016-10-17), Emoji Glyph Updates |
| 9.0 | U+1F927, 1F939, 1F941, 1F943..1F944, 1F956..1F959, 1F98B..1F98F | 14 | L2/17-161 | N4794 | Suignard, Michel (2017-05-08), "Ireland E20 (hands design), E25, E26 (1F98F RHINOCEROS)", Draft disposition of comments on PDAM1.2 to ISO/IEC 10646 5th edition |
| 9.0 | U+1F938, 1F93A..1F93E, 1F945..1F94B | 13 | L2/15-196R4 | | Komatsu, Hiroyuki (2015-07-31), Proposal to add more sports-related emoji characters |
| 9.0 | U+1F938, 1F93A..1F93E, 1F945..1F94B | 13 | L2/15-187 | | Moore, Lisa (2015-08-11), "E.1.2", UTC #144 Minutes |
| 9.0 | U+1F938, 1F93A..1F93E, 1F945..1F94B | 13 | L2/16-121 | | Moore, Lisa (2016-05-20), "Consensus 147-C4", UTC #147 Minutes, "Set "Emoji = No" and "Emoji_Presentation = No" for U+1F946 RIFLE and U+1F93B MODERN PENTATHLON. For U+1F946 set "Emoji_Direction_Base = No"." |
| 9.0 | U+1F938, 1F93A..1F93E, 1F945..1F94B | 13 | L2/16-228 | | Constable, Peter; Safran-Aasen, Judy; Coady, Michele; Bjornstad, Shelley (2016-08-04), Proposed Additions to Emoji_Modifier_Base |
| 9.0 | U+1F938, 1F93A..1F93E, 1F945..1F94B | 13 | L2/16-203 | | Moore, Lisa (2016-08-18), "B.12.1.3", UTC #148 Minutes |
| 9.0 | U+1F938, 1F93A..1F93E, 1F945..1F94B | 13 | L2/16-332 | | Edberg, Peter; et al. (2016-11-04), Remove multi-person emoji from Emoji_Modifier_Base |
| 9.0 | U+1F938, 1F93A..1F93E, 1F945..1F94B | 13 | L2/16-325 | | Moore, Lisa (2016-11-18), "Consensus 149-C13", UTC #149 Minutes |
| 9.0 | U+1F938, 1F93A..1F93E, 1F945..1F94B | 13 | L2/17-161 | N4794 | Suignard, Michel (2017-05-08), "Ireland E20 (hands design)", Draft disposition of comments on PDAM1.2 to ISO/IEC 10646 5th edition |
| 9.0 | U+1F938, 1F93A..1F93E, 1F945..1F94B | 13 | L2/24-252 | | Daniel, Jennifer (2024-09-20), Toned Multi-Person Emoji ZWJ Sequences [Affects U+1F93C] |
| 9.0 | U+1F938, 1F93A..1F93E, 1F945..1F94B | 13 | L2/24-226R | | Daniel, Jennifer (2024-11-06), Emoji Standard & Research Working Group Report for UTC #181 (2024Q4) [Affects U+1F93C] |
| 9.0 | U+1F938, 1F93A..1F93E, 1F945..1F94B | 13 | L2/24-221 | | Constable, Peter (2024-11-12), "Consensus 181-C6 [Affects U+1F93C]", UTC #181 Minutes, "Accept 150 new RGI emoji ZWJ sequences" |
| 9.0 | U+1F95A..1F95E, 1F990..1F991 | 7 | L2/15-061 | | Cummings, Craig (2015-01-31), Emoji Additions: Runner-ups |
| 9.0 | U+1F95A..1F95E, 1F990..1F991 | 7 | L2/15-267R3 | | Komatsu, Hiroyuki (2015-11-05), Preliminary proposal to add more food emoji characters |
| 9.0 | U+1F95A..1F95E, 1F990..1F991 | 7 | L2/15-254 | | Moore, Lisa (2015-11-16), "E.1.3", UTC #145 Minutes |
| 9.0 | U+1F95A..1F95E, 1F990..1F991 | 7 | L2/17-161 | N4794 | Suignard, Michel (2017-05-08), "Ireland E21 (1F95C PEANUTS, E27 (1F990 SHRIMP, 1F991 SQUID)", Draft disposition of comments on PDAM1.2 to ISO/IEC 10646 5th edition |
| 10.0 | U+1F900..1F90B | 12 | L2/15-173 | | Andreev, Aleksandr; Shardt, Yuri; Simmons, Nikita (2015-07-29), Proposal to Encode Some Additional Symbols Used in Church Slavonic Text |
| 10.0 | U+1F900..1F90B | 12 | L2/15-187 | | Moore, Lisa (2015-08-11), "E.2", UTC #144 Minutes |
| 10.0 | U+1F900..1F90B | 12 | | N4739 | "M64.06", Unconfirmed minutes of WG 2 meeting 64, 2016-08-31 |
| 10.0 | U+1F91F, 1F932 | 2 | L2/16-308 | | Edberg, Peter (2016-10-31), More hand gestures |
| 10.0 | U+1F91F, 1F932 | 2 | L2/16-369 | N4805 | Edberg, Peter (2016-11-10), Further emoji additions for Unicode 10, consolidated proposal |
| 10.0 | U+1F928 (Note: See also L2/16-369) | 1 | L2/15-325 | | Merz, Maximilian (2015-11-05), Proposal to Add Emoji: Face With One Eyebrow Raised |
| 10.0 | U+1F929..1F92F, 1F9D0 | 8 | L2/16-313 | | Karadeniz, Tayfun (2016-10-31), Emoji Faces Proposal for Unicode v10 |
| 10.0 | U+1F929..1F92F, 1F9D0 | 8 | L2/16-314 | | Karadeniz, Tayfun (2016-10-31), Emoji Faces Proposal for Unicode v10 - Supporting Data |
| 10.0 | U+1F929..1F92F, 1F9D0 | 8 | L2/17-016 | | Moore, Lisa (2017-02-08), "Consensus 150-C19", UTC #150 Minutes, "Change the name of U+1F92A (under ballot) to GRINNING FACE WITH ONE LARGE AND ONE SMALL EYE." |
| 10.0 | U+1F931 | 1 | L2/16-280 | | Lee, Rachel W. (2016-10-13), Proposal for Breastfeeding Emoji |
| 10.0 | U+1F931 | 1 | L2/16-282 | | Morzone, Elena; Capello, Leandro (2016-10-18), Request for an Emoji "Breastfeeding" |
| 10.0 | U+1F931 | 1 | L2/17-232 | | Buff, Charlotte (2017-06-28), Proposal for Fully Gender-Inclusive Emoji |
| 10.0 | U+1F931 | 1 | L2/17-287 | | Davis, Mark; Edberg, Peter (2017-08-08), "Gender Sign Sequences,1F9F5-1F9F7", Recommendations from ESC for 2018, part 2 |
| 10.0 | U+1F931 | 1 | L2/19-078 | | Daniel, Jennifer (2019-03-05), Using Gender Inclusive Designs |
| 10.0 | U+1F931 | 1 | L2/19-231R | | Daniel, Jennifer (2019-07-23), Recommendations for Gendered Emoji ZWJ Sequences for Unicode 13.0, Phase 2 |
| 10.0 | U+1F931 | 1 | L2/19-270 | | Moore, Lisa (2019-10-07), "E.1.1.1", UTC #160 Minutes |
| 10.0 | U+1F94C | 1 | L2/16-127 | | Komatsu, Hiroyuki (2016-05-25), Proposal for more winter activity emojis |
| 10.0 | U+1F95F | 1 | L2/16-024 | | Lee, Jennifer 8.; Lu, Yiying; Lao, Kenny; Mujumdar, Namrata (2016-01-19), Dumpling Emoji Submission |
| 10.0 | U+1F960 | 1 | L2/16-025 | | Lee, Jennifer 8.; Mujumdar, Namrata; Lu, Yiying (2015-12-29), Fortune Cookie Emoji Submission |
| 10.0 | U+1F961 (Note: See also L2/15-061) | 1 | L2/16-026 | | Lee, Jennifer 8.; Lu, Yiying (2016-01-19), Chinese Takeout Box Emoji Proposal |
| 10.0 | U+1F962 | 1 | L2/16-023 | | Lee, Jennifer 8.; Mujumdar, Namrata; Lao, Kenny; Lu, Yiying (2016-01-19), Chopsticks Emoji Proposal Submission |
| 10.0 | U+1F963..1F96B | 9 | L2/16-272 | | Wilbur, Kenzi; Lewis, Gabrielle (2016-10-04), Pie Emoji Submission |
| 10.0 | U+1F963..1F96B | 9 | L2/16-273 | | Luukkonen, Heikki (2016-10-04), Coconut Emoji Submission |
| 10.0 | U+1F963..1F96B | 9 | L2/16-316 | | Lee, Jennifer 8. (2016-10-31), Omnibus Food Emoji Proposal for Unicode 10 |
| 10.0 | U+1F963..1F96B | 9 | L2/16-372 | | Tomlin, Nicholas; Bai, Justin (2016-11-15), Proposal for a Sandwich Emoji |
| 10.0 | U+1F963..1F96B | 9 | L2/16-373 | | Laveaga, Ricky de; Lee, Jennifer 8. (2016-11-15), Bowl of Cereal Emoji Submission |
| 10.0 | U+1F963..1F96B | 9 | L2/16-374 | | Dabkowski, Maksymilian; Bai, Justin (2016-11-15), Proposal for a Pretzel Emoji |
| 10.0 | U+1F963..1F96B | 9 | L2/16-375 | | Ovadya, Aviv; Oruganti, Ashwini (2016-11-15), Broccoli Emoji Submission |
| 10.0 | U+1F963..1F96B | 9 | L2/17-161 | N4794 | Suignard, Michel (2017-05-08), "Ireland E22 (1F965 COCONUT)", Draft disposition of comments on PDAM1.2 to ISO/IEC 10646 5th edition |
| 10.0 | U+1F992..1F996 | 5 | L2/15-030 | | Davis, Mark (2015-01-29), Emojipedia top requests |
| 10.0 | U+1F992..1F996 | 5 | L2/16-072 | | Milan, Courtney (2016-04-02), Jurassic Emoji |
| 10.0 | U+1F992..1F996 | 5 | L2/16-103 | | West, Andrew (2016-04-29), Feedback on Jurassic Emoji Proposal |
| 10.0 | U+1F992..1F996 | 5 | L2/16-289 | | Schwarz, Dominik (2016-10-26), Proposal for new emoji character: dinosaur |
| 10.0 | U+1F992..1F996 | 5 | L2/16-295 | | Cummings, Craig (2016-11-08), Animals Proposal for Unicode v10 |
| 10.0 | U+1F992..1F996 | 5 | | N5020 (pdf, doc) | Umamaheswaran, V. S. (2019-01-11), "E4 (glyph changes)", Unconfirmed minutes of WG 2 meeting 67 |
| 10.0 | U+1F997 | 1 | L2/15-030 | | Davis, Mark (2015-01-29), Emojipedia top requests |
| 10.0 | U+1F997 | 1 | L2/16-300 | | Burtner, Susan (2016-09-15), Proposal for a New Emoji: Cricket |
| 10.0 | U+1F997 | 1 | | N5020 (pdf, doc) | Umamaheswaran, V. S. (2019-01-11), "E4 (glyph change)", Unconfirmed minutes of WG 2 meeting 67 |
| 10.0 | U+1F9D1..1F9D3 | 3 | L2/16-317 | | Hunt, Paul (2016-10-24), Proposal to enable gender inclusive emoji representation |
| 10.0 | U+1F9D1..1F9D3 | 3 | L2/19-189 | | Daniel, Jennifer (2019-04-25), Proposal for Consistent Gender Options for Emoji ZWJ Sequences |
| 10.0 | U+1F9D1..1F9D3 | 3 | L2/19-122 | | Moore, Lisa (2019-05-08), "Consensus 159-C13", UTC #159 Minutes |
| 10.0 | U+1F9D1..1F9D3 | 3 | L2/19-231R | | Daniel, Jennifer (2019-07-23), Recommendations for Gendered Emoji ZWJ Sequences for Unicode 13.0, Phase 2 |
| 10.0 | U+1F9D1..1F9D3 | 3 | L2/19-270 | | Moore, Lisa (2019-10-07), "E.1.1.1", UTC #160 Minutes |
| 10.0 | U+1F9D1..1F9D3 | 3 | L2/19-377R | | Daniel, Jennifer (2020-01-14), Multi-skintone Couples with Heart and Couples Kissing, Emoji ZWJ Sequences for Unicode 14.0 [Affects U+1F9D1] |
| 10.0 | U+1F9D1..1F9D3 | 3 | L2/20-015R | | Moore, Lisa (2020-05-14), "Consensus 162-C8", Draft Minutes of UTC Meeting 162, "Accept 200 provisional emoji candidates" |
| 10.0 | U+1F9D1..1F9D3 | 3 | L2/22-275 | | Stewart, Sean; Daniel, Jennifer (2022-10-19), Exploring Emoji Directionality [Affects U+1F9D1] |
| 10.0 | U+1F9D1..1F9D3 | 3 | L2/22-246 | | Daniel, Jennifer (2022-10-31), "3. Exploring Emoji Directionality [Affects U+1F9D1] and 4. Guidelines for Family Emoji ZWJ Sequences that currently lack RGI tone support", Emoji Subcommittee Report for UTC #173 (2022Q4) |
| 10.0 | U+1F9D1..1F9D3 | 3 | L2/22-276 | | Guidelines for Family Emoji ZWJ Sequences that currently lack RGI tone support, 2022-10-31 |
| 10.0 | U+1F9D1..1F9D3 | 3 | L2/23-029 | | Stewart, Sean (2022-12-19), Family Emoji Redesign: Gender Inclusive Variants |
| 10.0 | U+1F9D1..1F9D3 | 3 | L2/23-030R | | Stewart, Sean (2023-01-25), Emoji Directionality Recommendation [Affects U+1F9D1] |
| 10.0 | U+1F9D1..1F9D3 | 3 | L2/23-037R | | Daniel, Jennifer (2023-01-25), Recommendations for ZWJ Sequences, Unicode 15.1 [Affects U+1F9D1] |
| 10.0 | U+1F9D1..1F9D3 | 3 | L2/23-005 | | Constable, Peter (2023-02-01), "G.1.1 Emoji 15.1 Recommendations", UTC #174 Minutes |
| 10.0 | U+1F9D4 | 1 | L2/16-260 | | Jones, Craig (2016-09-19), Beard Emoji Submission |
| 10.0 | U+1F9D5 | 1 | L2/16-284 | | Alhumedhi, Rayouf; Lee, Jennifer 8.; et al. (2016-09-20), HIJAB/HEADSCARF EMOJI |
| 10.0 | U+1F9D6 | 1 | L2/16-197 | | Sauna Emojis Submission, 2016-05-13 |
| 10.0 | U+1F9D6 | 1 | L2/17-161 | N4794 | Suignard, Michel (2017-05-08), "Ireland E29", Draft disposition of comments on PDAM1.2 to ISO/IEC 10646 5th edition |
| 10.0 | U+1F9D7 | 1 | L2/16-247 | | van Veen, Tieme; Dekens, Tim; Verbeek, Jessica (2016-09-02), Proposal for "Climber" Emoji |
| 10.0 | U+1F9D8 | 1 | L2/16-279 | | Bramhill, Mark (2016-10-10), Proposal for Person Meditating Emoji |
| 10.0 | U+1F9D8 | 1 | L2/17-161 | N4794 | Suignard, Michel (2017-05-08), "Ireland E20 (hands design)", Draft disposition of comments on PDAM1.2 to ISO/IEC 10646 5th edition |
| 10.0 | U+1F9D9..1F9DF | 7 | L2/16-274 | | Neufeld, Ryan (2016-09-30), Mermaid Emoji Submission |
| 10.0 | U+1F9D9..1F9DF | 7 | L2/16-304 | | Karadeniz, Tayfun (2016-10-24), Fantasy Characters Proposal for Unicode v10 |
| 10.0 | U+1F9D9..1F9DF | 7 | L2/17-161 | N4794 | Suignard, Michel (2017-05-08), "Ireland E20 (hands design)", Draft disposition of comments on PDAM1.2 to ISO/IEC 10646 5th edition |
| 10.0 | U+1F9E0 | 1 | L2/16-299 | | Brassington, Cath (2016-10-25), The world needs a brain |
| 10.0 | U+1F9E0 | 1 | L2/17-161 | N4794 | Suignard, Michel (2017-05-08), "Ireland E31", Draft disposition of comments on PDAM1.2 to ISO/IEC 10646 5th edition |
| 10.0 | U+1F9E1 | 1 | L2/16-124 | | Hunt, Paul (2016-05-04), Proposal to encode ORANGE HEART emoji character |
| 10.0 | U+1F9E1 | 1 | L2/17-161 | N4794 | Suignard, Michel (2017-05-08), "Ireland E32", Draft disposition of comments on PDAM1.2 to ISO/IEC 10646 5th edition |
| 10.0 | U+1F9E2 | 1 | L2/16-357 | | Dash, Eric; Lee, Jennifer 8. (2016-10-31), Baseball Cap Emoji Proposal |
| 10.0 | U+1F9E3..1F9E5 | 3 | L2/16-362 | | Alhumedhi, Rayouf; Lee, Jennifer 8.; Messer, Aphee (2016-08-27), Addition of Winter Clothes Emojis |
| 10.0 | U+1F9E6 | 1 | L2/16-240 | | The Socks Emoji Submission, 2016-08-15 |
| 11.0 | U+1F94D..1F94F | 3 | L2/15-061 | | Cummings, Craig (2015-01-31), Emoji Additions: Runner-ups |
| 11.0 | U+1F94D..1F94F | 3 | L2/16-378 | | Heard, Jaron (2016-11-20), Skateboarder emoji submission |
| 11.0 | U+1F94D..1F94F | 3 | L2/16-382 | | Bohorad, Nicole; Aschenbach, Sarah; Stenersen, Steve; Freudiger, Mike (2016-12-05), Lacrosse stick and ball emoji submission |
| 11.0 | U+1F94D..1F94F | 3 | L2/17-257 | | Bayer, Devin (2016-12-24), Flying Disc Emoji Proposal |
| 11.0 | U+1F94D..1F94F | 3 | L2/17-184 | | Hernandez, Vickie (2017-06-02), Proposal for "Softball" Emoji |
| 11.0 | U+1F94D..1F94F | 3 | L2/17-277 | | Karadeniz, Tayfun; et al. (2017-07-28), Emoji Sports Proposal for Unicode v11 |
| 11.0 | U+1F94D..1F94F | 3 | L2/17-393 | | Anderson, Deborah (2017-10-22), Feedback from WG2 email discussion list on PDAM 2.2 |
| 11.0 | U+1F94D..1F94F | 3 | L2/18-027 | | Burge, Jeremy; Moore, Lisa (2018-01-15), Response to feedback from WG2 email discussion list on PDAM 2.2 |
| 11.0 | U+1F96C | 1 | L2/17-265 | | Wong, Nicole; Lee, Jennifer 8. (2017-06-30), Leafy Green Emoji Submission |
| 11.0 | U+1F96C | 1 | L2/17-393 | | Anderson, Deborah (2017-10-22), Feedback from WG2 email discussion list on PDAM 2.2 |
| 11.0 | U+1F96C | 1 | L2/18-027 | | Burge, Jeremy; Moore, Lisa (2018-01-15), Response to feedback from WG2 email discussion list on PDAM 2.2 |
| 11.0 | U+1F96D | 1 | L2/15-061 | | Cummings, Craig (2015-01-31), Emoji Additions: Runner-ups |
| 11.0 | U+1F96D | 1 | L2/17-203 | | Schwartz, Rob (2017-06-23), Mango Emoji Proposal |
| 11.0 | U+1F96D | 1 | L2/17-211 | | Huang, Yiqiu (2017-06-27), Proposal for New Mango Emoji |
| 11.0 | U+1F96D | 1 | L2/17-393 | | Anderson, Deborah (2017-10-22), Feedback from WG2 email discussion list on PDAM 2.2 |
| 11.0 | U+1F96D | 1 | L2/18-027 | | Burge, Jeremy; Moore, Lisa (2018-01-15), Response to feedback from WG2 email discussion list on PDAM 2.2 |
| 11.0 | U+1F96E | 1 | L2/17-024 | | Lee, Jennifer 8.; et al. (2017-01-04), Mooncake Emoji |
| 11.0 | U+1F96F | 1 | L2/17-261 | | Broder, Melanie; Barkey, Tim; Thomas, Robin; Ustin, Steve; Ustin, Jeffrey; Linzner, Greg; Palomino, Mabel; Lawrence, Jeffrey; Lee, Jennifer 8. (2017-07-01), Bagel Emoji Proposal |
| 11.0 | U+1F96F | 1 | L2/17-364 | | McGowan, Rick (2017-10-09), "Opt Subject: n4904 feedback: New emoji part 1", Comments on Public Review Issues (July 26 - October 13, 2017) |
| 11.0 | U+1F96F | 1 | L2/17-393 | | Anderson, Deborah (2017-10-22), Feedback from WG2 email discussion list on PDAM 2.2 |
| 11.0 | U+1F96F | 1 | L2/18-027 | | Burge, Jeremy; Moore, Lisa (2018-01-15), Response to feedback from WG2 email discussion list on PDAM 2.2 |
| 11.0 | U+1F96F | 1 | L2/17-362 | | Moore, Lisa (2018-02-02), "Consensus 153-C38", UTC #153 Minutes |
| 11.0 | U+1F970, 1F973..1F976, 1F97A (Note: See also L2/16-313 and L2/16-314) | 6 | L2/17-245 | | Karadeniz, Tayfun (2017-06-13), Emoji Faces Proposal for Unicode v11 - Supporting Data |
| 11.0 | U+1F970, 1F973..1F976, 1F97A | 6 | L2/17-244R | | Karadeniz, Tayfun (2017-08-01), Emoji Faces Proposal for Unicode v11 |
| 11.0 | U+1F970, 1F973..1F976, 1F97A | 6 | L2/17-296 | | Buff, Charlotte (2017-08-10), Comments on Recently Approved Emoji Candidate Names |
| 11.0 | U+1F970, 1F973..1F976, 1F97A | 6 | L2/17-303 | | Silva, Eduardo Marín (2017-08-16), Notes on emoji proposals |
| 11.0 | U+1F970, 1F973..1F976, 1F97A | 6 | L2/17-393 | | Anderson, Deborah (2017-10-22), Feedback from WG2 email discussion list on PDAM 2.2 |
| 11.0 | U+1F970, 1F973..1F976, 1F97A | 6 | L2/17-380R | | Emoji Subcommittee Report Q3 2017, 2017-10-23 |
| 11.0 | U+1F970, 1F973..1F976, 1F97A | 6 | L2/17-400 | N4918 | Ad Hoc-recommendations for Unicode 11+, 2017-10-26 |
| 11.0 | U+1F970, 1F973..1F976, 1F97A | 6 | L2/18-027 | | Burge, Jeremy; Moore, Lisa (2018-01-15), Response to feedback from WG2 email discussion list on PDAM 2.2 |
| 11.0 | U+1F970, 1F973..1F976, 1F97A | 6 | L2/17-362 | | Moore, Lisa (2018-02-02), "Consensus 153-C25", UTC #153 Minutes |
| 11.0 | U+1F97C..1F97D, 1F9A0, 1F9EA..1F9EF | 9 | L2/17-113 | | Lemonick, Sam; McKee, Alli; Morrison, Jessica; Smylie, Anna; Cummings, Craig (2017-04-18), Science Emoji Proposal for Unicode v2 |
| 11.0 | U+1F97C..1F97D, 1F9A0, 1F9EA..1F9EF | 9 | L2/17-105 | | McGowan, Rick (2017-05-03), Comments on Public Review Issues (Jan 18 - May 01, 2017) |
| 11.0 | U+1F97C..1F97D, 1F9A0, 1F9EA..1F9EF | 9 | L2/17-131 | | Edberg, Peter; et al. (2017-05-05), "C.4", Emoji Subcommittee Report Q2 2017 |
| 11.0 | U+1F97C..1F97D, 1F9A0, 1F9EA..1F9EF | 9 | L2/17-296 | | Buff, Charlotte (2017-08-10), Comments on Recently Approved Emoji Candidate Names |
| 11.0 | U+1F97C..1F97D, 1F9A0, 1F9EA..1F9EF | 9 | L2/17-393 | | Anderson, Deborah (2017-10-22), Feedback from WG2 email discussion list on PDAM 2.2 |
| 11.0 | U+1F97C..1F97D, 1F9A0, 1F9EA..1F9EF | 9 | L2/18-027 | | Burge, Jeremy; Moore, Lisa (2018-01-15), Response to feedback from WG2 email discussion list on PDAM 2.2 |
| 11.0 | U+1F97E | 1 | L2/17-271 | | Kamkoff, Christian; Lee, Jennifer 8. (2017-07-27), Hiking/Rugged Boot Emoji Submission |
| 11.0 | U+1F97F | 1 | L2/17-274 | | Hutchinson, Floriane (2017-07-01), Proposal for Woman's Flat Shoe Emoji |
| 11.0 | U+1F97F | 1 | L2/17-296 | | Buff, Charlotte (2017-08-10), Comments on Recently Approved Emoji Candidate Names |
| 11.0 | U+1F97F | 1 | L2/17-393 | | Anderson, Deborah (2017-10-22), Feedback from WG2 email discussion list on PDAM 2.2 |
| 11.0 | U+1F97F | 1 | L2/18-027 | | Burge, Jeremy; Moore, Lisa (2018-01-15), Response to feedback from WG2 email discussion list on PDAM 2.2 |
| 11.0 | U+1F998 | 1 | L2/17-264 | | Marx, Alex D.; Lee, Jennifer 8. (2017-07-01), Kangaroo Emoji Proposal |
| 11.0 | U+1F998 | 1 | | N5020 (pdf, doc) | Umamaheswaran, V. S. (2019-01-11), "E4 (glyph change)", Unconfirmed minutes of WG 2 meeting 67 |
| 11.0 | U+1F999 | 1 | L2/17-266 | | Li, Jason; Lee, Jennifer 8. (2017-07-01), Proposal for Llama Emoji |
| 11.0 | U+1F99A | 1 | L2/17-270 | | Kamkoff, Christian; Cho, Irene; Lu, Yiying; Lee, Jennifer 8. (2017-06-30), Peacock Emoji Submission |
| 11.0 | U+1F99B | 1 | L2/17-263 | | Wong, Nicole; Lee, Jennifer 8. (2017-07-26), Hippo Emoji Submission |
| 11.0 | U+1F99B | 1 | L2/17-393 | | Anderson, Deborah (2017-10-22), Feedback from WG2 email discussion list on PDAM 2.2 |
| 11.0 | U+1F99B | 1 | L2/18-027 | | Burge, Jeremy; Moore, Lisa (2018-01-15), Response to feedback from WG2 email discussion list on PDAM 2.2 |
| 11.0 | U+1F99B | 1 | | N5020 (pdf, doc) | Umamaheswaran, V. S. (2019-01-11), "E4 (glyph change)", Unconfirmed minutes of WG 2 meeting 67 |
| 11.0 | U+1F99C | 1 | L2/17-280 | | McLaughlin, Katie (2016-11-03), Proposal for TROPICAL BIRD emoji |
| 11.0 | U+1F99C | 1 | L2/17-281 | | Cummings, Craig (2017-08-01), Addendum of Selection Factors for Parrot Animal Emoji Proposal |
| 11.0 | U+1F99C | 1 | | N5020 (pdf, doc) | Umamaheswaran, V. S. (2019-01-11), "E4 (glyph change)", Unconfirmed minutes of WG 2 meeting 67 |
| 11.0 | U+1F99D | 1 | L2/17-278 | | Guo, Monica (2017-06-27), Proposal for New Emoji: RACCOON FACE |
| 11.0 | U+1F99D | 1 | L2/17-393 | | Anderson, Deborah (2017-10-22), Feedback from WG2 email discussion list on PDAM 2.2 |
| 11.0 | U+1F99D | 1 | L2/18-027 | | Burge, Jeremy; Moore, Lisa (2018-01-15), Response to feedback from WG2 email discussion list on PDAM 2.2 |
| 11.0 | U+1F99D | 1 | | N5020 (pdf, doc) | Umamaheswaran, V. S. (2019-01-11), "E4 (glyph change)", Unconfirmed minutes of WG 2 meeting 67 |
| 11.0 | U+1F99E | 1 | L2/14-174R | | Davis, Mark; Edberg, Peter (2014-08-27), Emoji Additions |
| 11.0 | U+1F99E | 1 | L2/15-061 | | Cummings, Craig (2015-01-31), Emoji Additions: Runner-ups |
| 11.0 | U+1F99E | 1 | L2/17-217 | | Lassen, Frederik (2017-06-30), Lobster Emoji |
| 11.0 | U+1F99E | 1 | L2/17-267 | | Sherry, Dylan (2017-06-30), Proposal for Lobster Emoji |
| 11.0 | U+1F99E | 1 | | N5020 (pdf, doc) | Umamaheswaran, V. S. (2019-01-11), "E4 (glyph change)", Unconfirmed minutes of WG 2 meeting 67 |
| 11.0 | U+1F99F | 1 | L2/17-295 | | Mackay, Ian M. (2016-06-23), Proposal to add a mosquito emoji character |
| 11.0 | U+1F99F | 1 | L2/17-268 | | Shaivitz, Marla; Chertack, Jeff (2017-06-30), Proposal for Mosquito Emoji |
| 11.0 | U+1F9A1 | 1 | | N4953 (pdf, doc) | "M66.11", Unconfirmed minutes of WG 2 meeting 66, 2018-03-23 |
| 11.0 | U+1F9A1 | 1 | L2/17-404 | | Cheng, Michelle; Lee, Jennifer 8. (2017-10-28), Badger Emoji Submission |
| 11.0 | U+1F9A1 | 1 | L2/17-362 | | Moore, Lisa (2018-02-02), "Consensus 153-C14", UTC #153 Minutes |
| 11.0 | U+1F9A2 | 1 | | N4953 (pdf, doc) | "M66.11", Unconfirmed minutes of WG 2 meeting 66, 2018-03-23 |
| 11.0 | U+1F9A2 | 1 | L2/17-403 | | Cheng, Michelle; et al. (2017-10-28), Swan Emoji Submission |
| 11.0 | U+1F9A2 | 1 | L2/17-362 | | Moore, Lisa (2018-02-02), "Consensus 153-C14", UTC #153 Minutes |
| 11.0 | U+1F9B0..1F9B3 | 4 | L2/17-011 | | Burge, Jeremy; et al. (2017-01-17), Summary of options for redhead emoji |
| 11.0 | U+1F9B0..1F9B3 | 4 | L2/17-018 | | McGowan, Rick (2017-01-18), Comments on Public Review Issues (Nov 7, 2016 - Jan 18, 2017) |
| 11.0 | U+1F9B0..1F9B3 | 4 | L2/17-016 | | Moore, Lisa (2017-02-08), "E.1.4", UTC #150 Minutes |
| 11.0 | U+1F9B0..1F9B3 | 4 | L2/17-082 | | Burge, Jeremy; et al. (2017-04-18), Possible Emoji Representation for Natural Hair Colors, Features, and Styles |
| 11.0 | U+1F9B0..1F9B3 | 4 | L2/17-131 | | Edberg, Peter; et al. (2017-05-05), "C.2", Emoji Subcommittee Report Q2 2017 |
| 11.0 | U+1F9B0..1F9B3 | 4 | L2/17-193 | | Buff, Charlotte (2017-08-01), Alternative Encoding Model for Emoji Hair Variations |
| 11.0 | U+1F9B0..1F9B3 | 4 | L2/17-283 | | Edberg, Peter; Davis, Mark; et al. (2017-08-01), Response to L2/17-193 |
| 11.0 | U+1F9B0..1F9B3 | 4 | L2/17-393 | | Anderson, Deborah (2017-10-22), Feedback from WG2 email discussion list on PDAM 2.2 |
| 11.0 | U+1F9B0..1F9B3 | 4 | L2/17-400 | N4918 | Ad Hoc-recommendations for Unicode 11+, 2017-10-26 |
| 11.0 | U+1F9B0..1F9B3 | 4 | L2/17-401 | | Ad Hoc recommendations for Emoji 6, 2017-10-26 |
| 11.0 | U+1F9B0..1F9B3 | 4 | L2/18-027 | | Burge, Jeremy; Moore, Lisa (2018-01-15), Response to feedback from WG2 email discussion list on PDAM 2.2 |
| 11.0 | U+1F9B0..1F9B3 | 4 | L2/17-362 | | Moore, Lisa (2018-02-02), "Consensus 153-C25 and 153-C34", UTC #153 Minutes |
| 11.0 | U+1F9B0..1F9B3 | 4 | | N5020 (pdf, doc) | Umamaheswaran, V. S. (2019-01-11), "E7 (glyph changes)", Unconfirmed minutes of WG 2 meeting 67 |
| 11.0 | U+1F9B4..1F9B7 | 4 | L2/14-174R | | Davis, Mark; Edberg, Peter (2014-08-27), Emoji Additions |
| 11.0 | U+1F9B4..1F9B7 | 4 | L2/15-061 | | Cummings, Craig (2015-01-31), Emoji Additions: Runner-ups |
| 11.0 | U+1F9B4..1F9B7 | 4 | L2/17-246 | | Solomon, Jane; Baker, Cody (2017-07-24), Proposal for the Bone Emoji |
| 11.0 | U+1F9B4..1F9B7 | 4 | L2/17-259 | | Lee, Jennifer 8.; Kamkoff, Chris (2017-07-28), Body Parts Emoji Proposal |
| 11.0 | U+1F9B4..1F9B7 | 4 | L2/17-393 | | Anderson, Deborah (2017-10-22), Feedback from WG2 email discussion list on PDAM 2.2 |
| 11.0 | U+1F9B4..1F9B7 | 4 | L2/18-027 | | Burge, Jeremy; Moore, Lisa (2018-01-15), Response to feedback from WG2 email discussion list on PDAM 2.2 |
| 11.0 | U+1F9B8..1F9B9 | 2 | L2/17-245 | | Karadeniz, Tayfun (2017-06-13), Emoji Faces Proposal for Unicode v11 - Supporting Data |
| 11.0 | U+1F9B8..1F9B9 | 2 | L2/17-244R | | Karadeniz, Tayfun (2017-08-01), Emoji Faces Proposal for Unicode v11 |
| 11.0 | U+1F9B8..1F9B9 | 2 | L2/17-303 | | Silva, Eduardo Marín (2017-08-16), Notes on emoji proposals |
| 11.0 | U+1F9B8..1F9B9 | 2 | L2/17-393 | | Anderson, Deborah (2017-10-22), Feedback from WG2 email discussion list on PDAM 2.2 |
| 11.0 | U+1F9B8..1F9B9 | 2 | L2/17-380R | | Emoji Subcommittee Report Q3 2017, 2017-10-23 |
| 11.0 | U+1F9B8..1F9B9 | 2 | L2/17-400 | N4918 | Ad Hoc-recommendations for Unicode 11+, 2017-10-26 |
| 11.0 | U+1F9B8..1F9B9 | 2 | L2/17-401 | | Ad Hoc recommendations for Emoji 6, 2017-10-26 |
| 11.0 | U+1F9B8..1F9B9 | 2 | L2/18-027 | | Burge, Jeremy; Moore, Lisa (2018-01-15), Response to feedback from WG2 email discussion list on PDAM 2.2 |
| 11.0 | U+1F9B8..1F9B9 | 2 | L2/18-023 | | "3. Skin tones on superheroes/villains", ESC Recommendations for Emoji 11.0, 2018-01-18 |
| 11.0 | U+1F9B8..1F9B9 | 2 | L2/18-007 | | Moore, Lisa (2018-03-19), "E.1.1", UTC #154 Minutes |
| 11.0 | U+1F9B8..1F9B9 | 2 | L2/17-362 | | Moore, Lisa (2018-02-02), "Consensus 153-C25 and 153-C34", UTC #153 Minutes |
| 11.0 | U+1F9C1 | 1 | L2/15-061 | | Cummings, Craig (2015-01-31), Emoji Additions: Runner-ups |
| 11.0 | U+1F9C1 | 1 | L2/17-262 | | Wade, Jessie (2017-06-28), Proposal for Cupcake Emoji |
| 11.0 | U+1F9C1 | 1 | L2/17-393 | | Anderson, Deborah (2017-10-22), Feedback from WG2 email discussion list on PDAM 2.2 |
| 11.0 | U+1F9C1 | 1 | L2/18-027 | | Burge, Jeremy; Moore, Lisa (2018-01-15), Response to feedback from WG2 email discussion list on PDAM 2.2 |
| 11.0 | U+1F9C2 | 1 | L2/16-191 | | Buff, Charlotte (2016-07-06), Proposal to Add a Salt Shaker Emoji to the Unicode Standard |
| 11.0 | U+1F9C2 | 1 | L2/17-272 | | Wong, Nicole; Lee, Jennifer 8. (2017-07-12), Salt Shaker Emoji Submission |
| 11.0 | U+1F9C2 | 1 | L2/17-393 | | Anderson, Deborah (2017-10-22), Feedback from WG2 email discussion list on PDAM 2.2 |
| 11.0 | U+1F9C2 | 1 | L2/18-027 | | Burge, Jeremy; Moore, Lisa (2018-01-15), Response to feedback from WG2 email discussion list on PDAM 2.2 |
| 11.0 | U+1F9E7 | 1 | L2/17-023R | | Lee, Jennifer 8.; et al. (2017-01-04), Red Envelope Emoji |
| 11.0 | U+1F9E7 | 1 | L2/17-393 | | Anderson, Deborah (2017-10-22), Feedback from WG2 email discussion list on PDAM 2.2 |
| 11.0 | U+1F9E7 | 1 | L2/18-027 | | Burge, Jeremy; Moore, Lisa (2018-01-15), Response to feedback from WG2 email discussion list on PDAM 2.2 |
| 11.0 | U+1F9E7 | 1 | | N5020 (pdf, doc) | Umamaheswaran, V. S. (2019-01-11), "E6 (glyph change)", Unconfirmed minutes of WG 2 meeting 67 |
| 11.0 | U+1F9E8 | 1 | L2/17-025R | | Lee, Jennifer 8.; et al. (2017-01-04), Firecracker Emoji |
| 11.0 | U+1F9E9 | 1 | L2/17-198 | | Spix, Marius (2017-06-10), Emoji Submission: JIGSAW PUZZLE PIECE |
| 11.0 | U+1F9F0 | 1 | L2/17-202 | | Baker, Cody (2017-06-27), Toolbox Emoji Proposal |
| 11.0 | U+1F9F0 | 1 | L2/17-393 | | Anderson, Deborah (2017-10-22), Feedback from WG2 email discussion list on PDAM 2.2 |
| 11.0 | U+1F9F0 | 1 | L2/18-027 | | Burge, Jeremy; Moore, Lisa (2018-01-15), Response to feedback from WG2 email discussion list on PDAM 2.2 |
| 11.0 | U+1F9F1 | 1 | L2/17-172 | | O'Shea, Julian (2017-05-16), Brick Emoji Submission |
| 11.0 | U+1F9F1 | 1 | L2/17-393 | | Anderson, Deborah (2017-10-22), Feedback from WG2 email discussion list on PDAM 2.2 |
| 11.0 | U+1F9F1 | 1 | L2/18-027 | | Burge, Jeremy; Moore, Lisa (2018-01-15), Response to feedback from WG2 email discussion list on PDAM 2.2 |
| 11.0 | U+1F9F1 | 1 | L2/18-115 | | Moore, Lisa (2018-05-09), "Consensus 154-C24", UTC #155 Minutes, "Change the name of U+1F9F1 BRICKS to BRICK." |
| 11.0 | U+1F9F2 | 1 | L2/17-185 | | Kimura-Thollander, Philippe (2016-05-24), Proposal to Add Magnet Character |
| 11.0 | U+1F9F2 | 1 | L2/17-393 | | Anderson, Deborah (2017-10-22), Feedback from WG2 email discussion list on PDAM 2.2 |
| 11.0 | U+1F9F2 | 1 | L2/18-027 | | Burge, Jeremy; Moore, Lisa (2018-01-15), Response to feedback from WG2 email discussion list on PDAM 2.2 |
| 11.0 | U+1F9F3 | 1 | L2/17-205 | | Spix, Marius (2017-06-22), Emoji Submission: LUGGAGE |
| 11.0 | U+1F9F4 | 1 | L2/17-212 | | Burke, Danielle; Byrnes, Erica (2017-06-27), Proposal for Lotion Emoji |
| 11.0 | U+1F9F4 | 1 | L2/17-296 | | Buff, Charlotte (2017-08-10), Comments on Recently Approved Emoji Candidate Names |
| 11.0 | U+1F9F4 | 1 | L2/17-393 | | Anderson, Deborah (2017-10-22), Feedback from WG2 email discussion list on PDAM 2.2 |
| 11.0 | U+1F9F4 | 1 | L2/18-027 | | Burge, Jeremy; Moore, Lisa (2018-01-15), Response to feedback from WG2 email discussion list on PDAM 2.2 |
| 11.0 | U+1F9F5..1F9F7 | 3 | L2/17-249 | | Hickman, Amanda; Romo, Amberley; Lee, Jennifer 8.; et al. (2017-07-28), Craft Emoji Proposal |
| 11.0 | U+1F9F5..1F9F7 | 3 | L2/17-393 | | Anderson, Deborah (2017-10-22), Feedback from WG2 email discussion list on PDAM 2.2 |
| 11.0 | U+1F9F5..1F9F7 | 3 | L2/18-027 | | Burge, Jeremy; Moore, Lisa (2018-01-15), Response to feedback from WG2 email discussion list on PDAM 2.2 |
| 11.0 | U+1F9F8 | 1 | L2/17-273 | | Jacobs, Ariel (2017-07-01), Proposal for Teddy Bear Emoji |
| 11.0 | U+1F9F9..1F9FD | 5 | L2/17-260 | | Marx, Alex D.; Lee, Jennifer 8. (2017-07-28), Household Chore Emoji Proposal |
| 11.0 | U+1F9F9..1F9FD | 5 | L2/17-393 | | Anderson, Deborah (2017-10-22), Feedback from WG2 email discussion list on PDAM 2.2 |
| 11.0 | U+1F9F9..1F9FD | 5 | L2/18-027 | | Burge, Jeremy; Moore, Lisa (2018-01-15), Response to feedback from WG2 email discussion list on PDAM 2.2 |
| 11.0 | U+1F9F9..1F9FD | 5 | L2/18-115 | | Moore, Lisa (2018-05-09), "Consensus 154-C23", UTC #155 Minutes, "Change the name of U+1F9FB ROLL OF TOILET PAPER to ROLL OF PAPER." |
| 11.0 | U+1F9FE | 1 | L2/17-208 | | O'Neill, Megan; Sharma, Alolita (2017-06-14), Proposal to add Emoji: Receipt |
| 11.0 | U+1F9FF | 1 | L2/15-315 | | Pandey, Anshuman (2015-11-03), Proposal to encode the 'Nazar' symbol |
| 11.0 | U+1F9FF | 1 | L2/17-058 | | Sözen, Çağla (2016-02-14), Evil Eye Emoji Proposal |
| 11.0 | U+1F9FF | 1 | L2/17-131 | | Edberg, Peter; et al. (2017-05-05), "C.1", Emoji Subcommittee Report Q2 2017 |
| 11.0 | U+1F9FF | 1 | L2/17-393 | | Anderson, Deborah (2017-10-22), Feedback from WG2 email discussion list on PDAM 2.2 |
| 11.0 | U+1F9FF | 1 | L2/18-027 | | Burge, Jeremy; Moore, Lisa (2018-01-15), Response to feedback from WG2 email discussion list on PDAM 2.2 |
| 12.0 | U+1F90D..1F90E | 2 | L2/18-141R2 | | Davis, Mark; et al. (2018-05-01), Emoji Colors (revised) |
| 12.0 | U+1F90D..1F90E | 2 | L2/18-143R2 | N4960 | Davis, Mark; et al. (2018-05-03), ESC Recommendations 2018Q2 (revised) |
| 12.0 | U+1F90D..1F90E | 2 | L2/18-115 | | Moore, Lisa (2018-05-09), "Consensus 155-C16 and 155-C18", UTC #155 Minutes |
| 12.0 | U+1F90D..1F90E | 2 | L2/18-191 | | Buff, Charlotte (2018-05-31), Comments on Emoji 12.0 Candidates |
| 12.0 | U+1F90D..1F90E | 2 | L2/18-219 | | West, Andrew (2018-07-11), Feedback on ESC recommendations for draft candidates for Emoji 12.0 (L2/18143R2) |
| 12.0 | U+1F90D..1F90E | 2 | L2/18-234 | N5008 | Everson, Michael (2018-07-18), Feedback on draft candidates for Emoji 12.0 (L2/18-143R2) |
| 12.0 | U+1F90D..1F90E | 2 | L2/18-246 | | Silva, Eduardo Marín (2018-07-20), Response to Andrew West on feedback on emoji submissions (L2/18-219) |
| 12.0 | U+1F90D..1F90E | 2 | L2/18-253 | | Davis, Mark (2018-08-21), Comments on accumulated feedback on Unicode 12.0 draft candidates |
| 12.0 | U+1F90D..1F90E | 2 | | N5020 (pdf, doc) | Umamaheswaran, V. S. (2019-01-11), "10.3.13", Unconfirmed minutes of WG 2 meeting 67 |
| 12.0 | U+1F90F (Note: See also L2/18-234, L2/18-143R2, L2/18-115 (Consensus 155-C16 and 155-C18), and N5020 (10.3.13)) | 1 | L2/18-139 | | Kortina, Jenny; Beamont, Christopher (2018-04-19), Proposal For New Emoji: Pinch |
| 12.0 | U+1F90F | 1 | L2/18-191 | | Buff, Charlotte (2018-05-31), Comments on Emoji 12.0 Candidates |
| 12.0 | U+1F90F | 1 | L2/18-253 | | Davis, Mark (2018-08-21), Comments on accumulated feedback on Unicode 12.0 draft candidates |
| 12.0 | U+1F90F | 1 | L2/18-183 | | Moore, Lisa (2018-11-20), "Consensus 156-C5 Change names of three characters", UTC #156 Minutes |
| 12.0 | U+1F93F | 1 | L2/17-381 | | Krupp, Holger (2017-09-12), Scuba Diving Emoji Submission |
| 12.0 | U+1F971 (Note: See also L2/18-219, L2/18-246, L2/18-234, L2/18-143R2, L2/18-115 (Consensus 155-C16 and 155-C18), and N5020 (10.3.13)) | 1 | L2/17-432 | | Peters, Jay (2017-11-19), Proposal for YAWNING FACE Emoji |
| 12.0 | U+1F971 | 1 | L2/18-191 | | Buff, Charlotte (2018-05-31), Comments on Emoji 12.0 Candidates |
| 12.0 | U+1F971 | 1 | L2/18-253 | | Davis, Mark (2018-08-21), Comments on accumulated feedback on Unicode 12.0 draft candidates |
| 12.0 | U+1F971 | 1 | | N5020 (pdf, doc) | Umamaheswaran, V. S. (2019-01-11), "10.3.13", Unconfirmed minutes of WG 2 meeting 67 |
| 12.0 | U+1F97B | 1 | L2/18-144 | | Thermidor, Melissa (2018-04-25), Sari Emoji |
| 12.0 | U+1F97B | 1 | L2/18-219 | | West, Andrew (2018-07-11), Feedback on ESC recommendations for draft candidates for Emoji 12.0 (L2/18143R2) |
| 12.0 | U+1F97B | 1 | L2/18-253 | | Davis, Mark (2018-08-21), Comments on accumulated feedback on Unicode 12.0 draft candidates |
| 12.0 | U+1F9A5 | 1 | L2/18-074 | | Tasche, Bodo; Blanchat, Kelly Marie; Lee, Jennifer 8. (2018-03-07), Proposal for SLOTH Emoji |
| 12.0 | U+1F9A5 | 1 | L2/18-253 | | Davis, Mark (2018-08-21), Comments on accumulated feedback on Unicode 12.0 draft candidates |
| 12.0 | U+1F9A6 | 1 | L2/18-093 | | Dinculescu, Monica; Solomon, Jane (2018-02-01), Proposal for a New Emoji: Otter |
| 12.0 | U+1F9A6 | 1 | L2/18-253 | | Davis, Mark (2018-08-21), Comments on accumulated feedback on Unicode 12.0 draft candidates |
| 12.0 | U+1F9A7 | 1 | L2/18-137 | | Bushnell-Boates, Charlotte (2018-03-25), Orangutan Emoji Submission |
| 12.0 | U+1F9A7 | 1 | L2/18-253 | | Davis, Mark (2018-08-21), Comments on accumulated feedback on Unicode 12.0 draft candidates |
| 12.0 | U+1F9A8 | 1 | L2/18-128 | | Blanchat, Kelly Marie; Jennings, Shelby; Knell, Dwight (2018-03-01), Proposal for SKUNK Emoji |
| 12.0 | U+1F9A9 | 1 | L2/18-098 | | O'Neill, Megan (2018-03-22), Proposal for Flamingo Emoji |
| 12.0 | U+1F9AA | 1 | L2/18-123 | | Benenson, Fred (2018-03-31), Proposal for New OYSTER Emoji |
| 12.0 | U+1F9AA | 1 | L2/18-191 | | Buff, Charlotte (2018-05-31), Comments on Emoji 12.0 Candidates |
| 12.0 | U+1F9AA | 1 | L2/18-253 | | Davis, Mark (2018-08-21), Comments on accumulated feedback on Unicode 12.0 draft candidates |
| 12.0 | U+1F9AE..1F9AF, 1F9BA..1F9BF | 8 | L2/18-080 | | Proposal For New Accessibility Emoji, 2018-03-01 |
| 12.0 | U+1F9AE..1F9AF, 1F9BA..1F9BF | 8 | L2/18-138 | | McGowan, Rick (2018-04-26), Compilation of Feedback on Accessibility Emoji proposal |
| 12.0 | U+1F9AE..1F9AF, 1F9BA..1F9BF | 8 | L2/18-191 | | Buff, Charlotte (2018-05-31), Comments on Emoji 12.0 Candidates |
| 12.0 | U+1F9AE..1F9AF, 1F9BA..1F9BF | 8 | L2/18-256 | | Edberg, Peter (2018-07-26), Proposal for Safety Vest Emoji (and related ZWJ sequence) |
| 12.0 | U+1F9AE..1F9AF, 1F9BA..1F9BF | 8 | L2/18-253 | | Davis, Mark (2018-08-21), Comments on accumulated feedback on Unicode 12.0 draft candidates |
| 12.0 | U+1F9AE..1F9AF, 1F9BA..1F9BF | 8 | L2/18-307 | | "Modifications to previously proposed ZWJ Sequences", ESC Recommendations for 2018Q4 UTC, 2018-09-18 |
| 12.0 | U+1F9AE..1F9AF, 1F9BA..1F9BF | 8 | L2/18-272 | | Moore, Lisa (2018-10-29), "Consensus 157-C9", UTC #157 Minutes, "Approve 36 new ZWJ sequences as RGI in emoji 12.0, as documented in L2/18-306." |
| 12.0 | U+1F9AE..1F9AF, 1F9BA..1F9BF | 8 | L2/18-306 | | Edberg, Peter (2018-11-18), RGI emoji sequences for people in wheelchairs and with probing cane |
| 12.0 | U+1F9AE..1F9AF, 1F9BA..1F9BF | 8 | L2/18-183 | | Moore, Lisa (2018-11-20), "E.1.3.8 Safety Vest Emoji", UTC #156 Minutes |
| 12.0 | U+1F9C3 | 1 | L2/18-130 | | Schear, Theo; Lee, Jennifer 8. (2018-02-28), Proposal for JUICE Emoji |
| 12.0 | U+1F9C4 | 1 | L2/18-076 | | Adams, Clint (2018-03-20), Proposal for Garlic Emoji |
| 12.0 | U+1F9C4 | 1 | L2/18-253 | | Davis, Mark (2018-08-21), Comments on accumulated feedback on Unicode 12.0 draft candidates |
| 12.0 | U+1F9C5 | 1 | L2/18-077 | | Adams, Clint; Lee, Jennifer 8. (2018-03-20), Proposal for Onion Emoji |
| 12.0 | U+1F9C5 | 1 | L2/18-253 | | Davis, Mark (2018-08-21), Comments on accumulated feedback on Unicode 12.0 draft candidates |
| 12.0 | U+1F9C6 | 1 | L2/18-125 | | Klemens, Ben (2018-04-04), Proposal to Add Emoji Symbol for Falafel |
| 12.0 | U+1F9C6 | 1 | L2/18-191 | | Buff, Charlotte (2018-05-31), Comments on Emoji 12.0 Candidates |
| 12.0 | U+1F9C6 | 1 | L2/18-253 | | Davis, Mark (2018-08-21), Comments on accumulated feedback on Unicode 12.0 draft candidates |
| 12.0 | U+1F9C7 | 1 | L2/18-087 | | Peters, Jay (2018-03-15), Proposal for WAFFLE Emoji |
| 12.0 | U+1F9C8 | 1 | L2/18-112 | | Neudert, Lisa-Maria; Lee, Jennifer 8. (2018-03-03), Proposal for BUTTER Emoji |
| 12.0 | U+1F9C9 | 1 | L2/18-122 | | Coelho, Florencia; Guini, Daniela; Zalucki, Martín; Panelli, Emiliano; Nasra, Santiago (2018-03-31), Mate Emoji Proposal |
| 12.0 | U+1F9CA | 1 | L2/18-111 | | Gubik, Michael; Moore, Tom (2018-03-27), Proposal for a New Emoji: Iceberg |
| 12.0 | U+1F9CA | 1 | L2/18-253 | | Davis, Mark (2018-08-21), Comments on accumulated feedback on Unicode 12.0 draft candidates |
| 12.0 | U+1F9CD..1F9CE | 2 | L2/18-091 | | Lee, Jennifer 8.; Marx, Alex D. (2018-03-01), Emoji Proposal for SITTING PERSON, STANDING PERSON and KNEELING PERSON |
| 12.0 | U+1F9CD..1F9CE | 2 | L2/18-253 | | Davis, Mark (2018-08-21), Comments on accumulated feedback on Unicode 12.0 draft candidates |
| 12.0 | U+1F9CD..1F9CE | 2 | L2/22-275 | | Stewart, Sean; Daniel, Jennifer (2022-10-19), Exploring Emoji Directionality [Affects U+1F9CE] |
| 12.0 | U+1F9CD..1F9CE | 2 | L2/22-246 | | Daniel, Jennifer (2022-10-31), "3. Exploring Emoji Directionality [Affects U+1F9CE]", Emoji Subcommittee Report for UTC #173 (2022Q4) |
| 12.0 | U+1F9CD..1F9CE | 2 | L2/23-030R | | Stewart, Sean (2023-01-25), Emoji Directionality Recommendation [Affects U+1F9CE] |
| 12.0 | U+1F9CD..1F9CE | 2 | L2/23-037R | | Daniel, Jennifer (2023-01-25), Recommendations for ZWJ Sequences, Unicode 15.1 [Affects U+1F9CE] |
| 12.0 | U+1F9CD..1F9CE | 2 | L2/23-005 | | Constable, Peter (2023-02-01), "G.1.1 Emoji 15.1 Recommendations", UTC #174 Minutes |
| 12.0 | U+1F9CF | 1 | L2/18-222R3 | | "2. Recommendations for Emoji 12.0 (2019)", ESC Recommendations for 2018Q3 UTC, 2018-07-25 |
| 12.0 | U+1F9CF | 1 | L2/18-229R | | Proposal for Deaf Person Emoji (revised), 2018-07-25 |
| 12.0 | U+1F9CF | 1 | L2/18-183 | | Moore, Lisa (2018-11-20), "E.1.4.5", UTC #156 Minutes |
| 13.0 | U+1F90C | 1 | L2/19-159 | | Farano, Adriano; Lee, Jennifer 8.; Schear, Theo (2019-04-17), What do you want? Pinched Fingers Emoji Proposal |
| 13.0 | U+1F90C | 1 | L2/19-190R (pdf, aux) | N5056 | Davis, Mark (2019-04-30), Emoji Recommendations 2019Q2 (revised) |
| 13.0 | U+1F90C | 1 | L2/19-122 | | Moore, Lisa (2019-05-08), "Consensus 159-C12", UTC #159 Minutes |
| 13.0 | U+1F972 | 1 | L2/19-147 (Note: See also L2/19-190R, L2/19-122 (Consensus 159-C12)) | | Daniel, Jennifer (2019-04-23), Proposal for Slightly Smiling Face with Tear emoji |
| 13.0 | U+1F977 | 1 | L2/18-197 | | Toltzis, Avi (2018-05-23), Proposal for New NINJA Emoji |
| 13.0 | U+1F977 | 1 | L2/19-395 | | Daniel, Jennifer (2019-12-09), Additional RGI emoji sequences for Ninja Emoji for Unicode 13.0 |
| 13.0 | U+1F977 | 1 | L2/20-015R | | Moore, Lisa (2020-05-14), "E.1.6 Additional RGI emoji sequences for Ninja Emoji for Unicode 13.0", Draft Minutes of UTC Meeting 162 |
| 13.0 | U+1F978 | 1 | L2/18-311 | | Hy, Mo (2018-07-18), Proposal for New Emoji: Disguised Face |
| 13.0 | U+1F9A3 | 1 | L2/17-161 | N4794 | Suignard, Michel (2017-05-08), "UK T14", Draft disposition of comments on PDAM1.2 to ISO/IEC 10646 5th edition |
| 13.0 | U+1F9A3 | 1 | L2/17-420 | | West, Andrew (2017-11-15), Mammoth Emoji Submission |
| 13.0 | U+1F9A3 | 1 | L2/18-183 | | Moore, Lisa (2018-11-20), "Consensus 156-C23", UTC #156 Minutes, "Add MAMMOTH to the list of provisional emoji candidates for Unicode version 13.0." |
| 13.0 | U+1F9A3 | 1 | | N5020 (pdf, doc) | Umamaheswaran, V. S. (2019-01-11), "10.3.13", Unconfirmed minutes of WG 2 meeting 67 |
| 13.0 | U+1F9A4 | 1 | L2/17-161 | N4794 | Suignard, Michel (2017-05-08), "UK T14", Draft disposition of comments on PDAM1.2 to ISO/IEC 10646 5th edition |
| 13.0 | U+1F9A4 | 1 | L2/17-441 | | West, Andrew (2017-11-15), Dodo Emoji Submission |
| 13.0 | U+1F9A4 | 1 | L2/18-183 | | Moore, Lisa (2018-11-20), "Consensus 156-C24", UTC #156 Minutes, "Add DODO to the list of provisional emoji candidates for Unicode version 13.0." |
| 13.0 | U+1F9AB | 1 | L2/19-110 | | Donovan, Joan; Reid, Nathalie; Schear, Theo; Zeng, Anna; Lee, Jennifer 8. (2017-03-07), Proposal for BEAVER Emoji |
| 13.0 | U+1F9AC | 1 | L2/19-187 | | Schmidt, Alex (2019-04-29), Proposal for BISON emoji |
| 13.0 | U+1F9AD | 1 | L2/19-155 | | Carter, Erik (April 2019), Proposal for a New Emoji: Seal |
| 13.0 | U+1F9CB | 1 | L2/18-341 | | Deng, Timothy; Khandekar, Sujay; Kumar, Ranjitha; Lu, Yiying (2018-09-02), Proposal for New RGI Bubble Tea Emoji |
| 14.0 | U+1F979 | 1 | L2/19-390 | | Daniel, Jennifer; Cohn, Neil (2019-12-04), Comparison of Unicode Faces and JVL morphemes |
| 14.0 | U+1F979 | 1 | L2/19-389 | | Daniel, Jennifer; Cohn, Neil (2019-12-04), Smileys for consideration for Unicode 14.0 |
| 14.0 | U+1F979 | 1 | L2/20-064 | | Cohn, Neil; Daniel, Jennifer (2020-02-04), Face Holding Back Tears Proposal for Unicode 14.0 |
| 14.0 | U+1F979 | 1 | L2/20-237 | | Moore, Lisa (2020-10-27), "Consensus 165-C23", UTC #165 Minutes |
| 14.0 | U+1F979 | 1 | L2/20-242R2 | | Daniel, Jennifer (2020-10-07), Recommendations for Emoji, Unicode 14.0 |
| 14.0 | U+1F9CC | 1 | L2/17-329 | N4888 | Future Additions to ISO/IEC 10646, 2017-09-24 |
| 14.0 | U+1F9CC | 1 | | N4953 (pdf, doc) | Unconfirmed minutes of WG 2 meeting 66, 2018-03-23 |
| 14.0 | U+1F9CC | 1 | L2/19-232 | N5058 | West, Andrew; Everson, Michael (2019-05-04), Proposal for Emoji: TROLL |
| 14.0 | U+1F9CC | 1 | | N5124R | Suignard, Michel (2019-12-12), Disposition of comments on ISO/IEC CD.3 10646 6th edition |
| 14.0 | U+1F9CC | 1 | L2/20-237 | | Moore, Lisa (2020-10-27), "Consensus 165-C23", UTC #165 Minutes |
| 14.0 | U+1F9CC | 1 | L2/20-242R2 | | Daniel, Jennifer (2020-10-07), Recommendations for Emoji, Unicode 14.0 |
