= Transport and Map Symbols =

- Range: U+1F680..U+1F6FF (128 code points)
- Plane: SMP
- Scripts: Common
- Symbol sets: Map symbols Transport icons Emoji
- Assigned: 120 code points
- Unused: 8 reserved code points

Unicode Version History
- 6.0 (2010): 70 (+70)
- 7.0 (2014): 97 (+27)
- 8.0 (2015): 98 (+1)
- 9.0 (2016): 103 (+5)
- 10.0 (2017): 107 (+4)
- 11.0 (2018): 108 (+1)
- 12.0 (2019): 110 (+2)
- 13.0 (2020): 114 (+4)
- 14.0 (2021): 117 (+3)
- 15.0 (2022): 118 (+1)
- 17.0 (2025): 119 (+1)
- 18.0 (2026): 120 (+1)

Unicode documentation
- Code chart ∣ Web page

Transport and Map Symbols is a Unicode block containing transportation and map icons, largely for compatibility with Japanese telephone carriers' emoji implementations of Shift JIS and for encoding characters in the Wingdings and Wingdings 2 character sets.

== Block ==
Transport and Map Symbols^{[1]}^{[2]} Official Unicode Consortium code chart (PDF)
	0	1	2	3	4	5	6	7	8	9	A	B	C	D	E	F
U+1F68x	🚀	🚁	🚂	🚃	🚄	🚅	🚆	🚇	🚈	🚉	🚊	🚋	🚌	🚍	🚎	🚏
U+1F69x	🚐	🚑	🚒	🚓	🚔	🚕	🚖	🚗	🚘	🚙	🚚	🚛	🚜	🚝	🚞	🚟
U+1F6Ax	🚠	🚡	🚢	🚣	🚤	🚥	🚦	🚧	🚨	🚩	🚪	🚫	🚬	🚭	🚮	🚯
U+1F6Bx	🚰	🚱	🚲	🚳	🚴	🚵	🚶	🚷	🚸	🚹	🚺	🚻	🚼	🚽	🚾	🚿
U+1F6Cx	🛀	🛁	🛂	🛃	🛄	🛅	🛆	🛇	🛈	🛉	🛊	🛋	🛌	🛍	🛎	🛏
U+1F6Dx	🛐	🛑	🛒	🛓	🛔	🛕	🛖	🛗	🛘	🛙			🛜	🛝	🛞	🛟
U+1F6Ex	🛠	🛡	🛢	🛣	🛤	🛥	🛦	🛧	🛨	🛩	🛪	🛫	🛬			
U+1F6Fx	🛰	🛱	🛲	🛳	🛴	🛵	🛶	🛷	🛸	🛹	🛺	🛻	🛼			
Notes 1.As of Unicode version 18.0 2.Grey areas indicate non-assigned code points

== Emoji ==
The Transport and Map Symbols block contains 107 emoji: U+1F680–U+1F6C5, U+1F6CB–U+1F6D2, U+1F6D5–U+1F6D9, U+1F6DC–U+1F6E5, U+1F6E9, U+1F6EB–U+1F6EC, U+1F6F0 and U+1F6F3–U+1F6FC.

The block has 46 standardized variants defined to specify emoji-style (U+FE0F VS16) or text presentation (U+FE0E VS15) for the following 23 base characters: U+1F687, U+1F68D, U+1F691, U+1F694, U+1F698, U+1F6AD, U+1F6B2, U+1F6B9–U+1F6BA, U+1F6BC, U+1F6CB, U+1F6CD–U+1F6CF, U+1F6E0–U+1F6E5, U+1F6E9, U+1F6F0 and U+1F6F3.

Emoji variation sequences
U+	1F687	1F68D	1F691	1F694	1F698	1F6AD	1F6B2	1F6B9	1F6BA	1F6BC	1F6CB	1F6CD
default presentation	emoji	emoji	emoji	emoji	emoji	emoji	emoji	emoji	emoji	emoji	text	text
base code point	🚇	🚍	🚑	🚔	🚘	🚭	🚲	🚹	🚺	🚼	🛋	🛍
base+VS15 (text)	🚇︎	🚍︎	🚑︎	🚔︎	🚘︎	🚭︎	🚲︎	🚹︎	🚺︎	🚼︎	🛋︎	🛍︎
base+VS16 (emoji)	🚇️	🚍️	🚑️	🚔️	🚘️	🚭️	🚲️	🚹️	🚺️	🚼️	🛋️	🛍️
U+	1F6CE	1F6CF	1F6E0	1F6E1	1F6E2	1F6E3	1F6E4	1F6E5	1F6E9	1F6F0	1F6F3	
default presentation	text	text	text	text	text	text	text	text	text	text	text	
base code point	🛎	🛏	🛠	🛡	🛢	🛣	🛤	🛥	🛩	🛰	🛳	
base+VS15 (text)	🛎︎	🛏︎	🛠︎	🛡︎	🛢︎	🛣︎	🛤︎	🛥︎	🛩︎	🛰︎	🛳︎	
base+VS16 (emoji)	🛎️	🛏️	🛠️	🛡️	🛢️	🛣️	🛤️	🛥️	🛩️	🛰️	🛳️	

== Emoji modifiers ==
The Transport and Map Symbols block has six emoji that represent people or body parts. They can be modified using U+1F3FB–U+1F3FF to provide for a range of human skin color using the Fitzpatrick scale:

Human emoji
U+	1F6A3	1F6B4	1F6B5	1F6B6	1F6C0	1F6CC
emoji	🚣	🚴	🚵	🚶	🛀	🛌
FITZ-1-2	🚣🏻	🚴🏻	🚵🏻	🚶🏻	🛀🏻	🛌🏻
FITZ-3	🚣🏼	🚴🏼	🚵🏼	🚶🏼	🛀🏼	🛌🏼
FITZ-4	🚣🏽	🚴🏽	🚵🏽	🚶🏽	🛀🏽	🛌🏽
FITZ-5	🚣🏾	🚴🏾	🚵🏾	🚶🏾	🛀🏾	🛌🏾
FITZ-6	🚣🏿	🚴🏿	🚵🏿	🚶🏿	🛀🏿	🛌🏿

Additional human emoji can be found in other Unicode blocks: Dingbats, Emoticons, Miscellaneous Symbols, Miscellaneous Symbols and Pictographs, Supplemental Symbols and Pictographs and Symbols and Pictographs Extended-A.

== History ==
The following Unicode-related documents record the purpose and process of defining specific characters in the Transport and Map Symbols block:

Version	Final code points (Note: Proposed code points and characters names may differ from final code points and names)	Count	L2 ID	WG2 ID	Document
6.0	U+1F680..1F6C5 (Note: Refer to the history section of the Miscellaneous Symbols and Pictographs block for additional emoji-related documents)	70	L2/06-272		Stötzner, Andreas (2006-07-30), Public Signage (I)
6.0	U+1F680..1F6C5	70	L2/06-370		Stötzner, Andreas (2006-11-02), Symbols
6.0	U+1F680..1F6C5	70	L2/09-025R2	N3582 (Note: Japanese translation of N3582 is available as N3621)	Scherer, Markus; Davis, Mark; Momoi, Kat; Tong, Darick; Kida, Yasuo; Edberg, Peter (2009-03-05), Proposal for Encoding Emoji Symbols
6.0	U+1F680..1F6C5	70	L2/09-026R	N3583	Scherer, Markus; Davis, Mark; Momoi, Kat; Tong, Darick; Kida, Yasuo; Edberg, Peter (2009-02-06), Emoji Symbols Proposed for New Encoding
6.0	U+1F680..1F6C5	70	L2/09-027R2	N3681	Scherer, Markus (2009-09-17), Emoji Symbols: Background Data
6.0	U+1F680..1F6C5	70	L2/09-114	N3607	Towards an encoding of symbol characters used as emoji, 2009-04-06
6.0	U+1F680..1F6C5	70	L2/09-272		Scherer, Markus; Davis, Mark; Momoi, Kat; Edberg, Peter (2009-08-06), Emoji: Review of PDAM 8
6.0	U+1F680..1F6C5	70	L2/09-412	N3722	Suignard, Michel (2009-10-26), "USA T.3, Ireland T15-T17, E10, Germany T24", Disposition of comments on SC2 N 4078 (PDAM text for Amendment 8 to ISO/IEC 10646:2003)
6.0	U+1F680..1F6C5	70	L2/10-025	N3726	Constable, Peter (2009-10-27), "7, 13", Emoji ad-hoc meeting report 2009-10-27
6.0	U+1F680..1F6C5	70		N3703 (pdf, doc)	Umamaheswaran, V. S. (2010-04-13), "M55.9k", Unconfirmed minutes of WG 2 meeting no. 55, Tokyo 2009-10-26/30
6.0	U+1F680..1F6C5	70	L2/09-335R		Moore, Lisa (2009-11-10), "Consensus 121-C8", UTC #121 / L2 #218 Minutes
6.0	U+1F680..1F6C5	70	L2/10-089	N3777	KDDI Input on Emoji, 2010-03-08
6.0	U+1F680..1F6C5	70	L2/10-137	N3828	Suignard, Michel (2010-04-22), Disposition of comments on SC2 N 4123 (FPDAM text for Amendment 8 to ISO/IEC 10646:2003)
6.0	U+1F680..1F6C5	70	L2/10-138	N3829	Constable, Peter; et al. (2010-04-27), "15", Emoji Ad-Hoc Meeting Report
6.0	U+1F680..1F6C5	70	L2/15-071R		Davis, Mark; Burge, Jeremy (2015-02-03), More Unicode Emoji Glyph changes
6.0	U+1F680..1F6C5	70	L2/15-141 (pdf, html)		Davis, Mark; Edberg, Peter (2015-03-31), Emoji Glyph and Annotation Recommendations
6.0	U+1F680..1F6C5	70	L2/15-107		Moore, Lisa (2015-05-12), "Consensus 143-C20", UTC #143 Minutes, "Update chart glyphs and annotations based on L2/15-151 for Unicode 8.0."
6.0	U+1F680..1F6C5	70	L2/16-361		Pournader, Roozbeh; Felt, Doug (2016-11-07), Add text and emoji standardized variation sequences for 96 symbols
6.0	U+1F680..1F6C5	70		N5020 (pdf, doc)	Umamaheswaran, V. S. (2019-01-11), "6.2.3 T5", Unconfirmed minutes of WG 2 meeting 67
6.0	U+1F680..1F6C5	70	L2/22-275		Stewart, Sean; Daniel, Jennifer (2022-10-19), Exploring Emoji Directionality [Affects U+1F6B6]
6.0	U+1F680..1F6C5	70	L2/22-246		Daniel, Jennifer (2022-10-31), "3. Exploring Emoji Directionality [Affects U+1F6B6]", Emoji Subcommittee Report for UTC #173 (2022Q4)
6.0	U+1F680..1F6C5	70	L2/23-030R		Stewart, Sean (2023-01-25), Emoji Directionality Recommendation [Affects U+1F6B6]
6.0	U+1F680..1F6C5	70	L2/23-037R		Daniel, Jennifer (2023-01-25), Recommendations for ZWJ Sequences, Unicode 15.1 [Affects U+1F6B6]
6.0	U+1F680..1F6C5	70	L2/23-005		Constable, Peter (2023-02-01), "G.1.1 Emoji 15.1 Recommendations", UTC #174 Minutes
7.0	U+1F6C6..1F6CF, 1F6E0..1F6EC, 1F6F0..1F6F3	27	L2/11-052R		Suignard, Michel (2011-02-15), Wingdings and Webdings symbols - Preliminary study
7.0	U+1F6C6..1F6CF, 1F6E0..1F6EC, 1F6F0..1F6F3	27	L2/11-149		Suignard, Michel (2011-05-09), Proposal to add Wingdings and Webdings symbols
7.0	U+1F6C6..1F6CF, 1F6E0..1F6EC, 1F6F0..1F6F3	27	L2/11-196	N4022	Suignard, Michel (2011-05-21), Revised Wingdings proposal
7.0	U+1F6C6..1F6CF, 1F6E0..1F6EC, 1F6F0..1F6F3	27	L2/11-247	N4115	Suignard, Michel (2011-06-08), Proposal to add Wingdings and Webdings Symbols
7.0	U+1F6C6..1F6CF, 1F6E0..1F6EC, 1F6F0..1F6F3	27	L2/11-344	N4143	Suignard, Michel (2011-09-28), Updated proposal to add Wingdings and Webdings Symbols
7.0	U+1F6C6..1F6CF, 1F6E0..1F6EC, 1F6F0..1F6F3	27		N4103	"10.2.1 Wingdings/Webdings additions", Unconfirmed minutes of WG 2 meeting 58, 2012-01-03
7.0	U+1F6C6..1F6CF, 1F6E0..1F6EC, 1F6F0..1F6F3	27	L2/12-130	N4239	Suignard, Michel (2012-05-08), Disposition of comments on SC2 N 4201 (PDAM text for Amendment 1.2 to ISO/IEC 10646 3rd edition)
7.0	U+1F6C6..1F6CF, 1F6E0..1F6EC, 1F6F0..1F6F3	27		N4363	Suignard, Michel (2012-10-13), Status of encoding of Wingdings and Webdings Symbols
7.0	U+1F6C6..1F6CF, 1F6E0..1F6EC, 1F6F0..1F6F3	27	L2/12-368	N4384	Suignard, Michel (2012-11-06), Status of encoding of Wingdings and Webdings Symbols
7.0	U+1F6C6..1F6CF, 1F6E0..1F6EC, 1F6F0..1F6F3	27	L2/12-086	N4223	Requests regarding the Wingdings/Webdings characters in ISO/IEC 10646 PDAM 1.2, 2012-12-27
7.0	U+1F6C6..1F6CF, 1F6E0..1F6EC, 1F6F0..1F6F3	27		N4353 (pdf, doc)	"M60.05d, M60.05f, M60.05g", Unconfirmed minutes of WG 2 meeting 60, 2013-05-23
7.0	U+1F6C6..1F6CF, 1F6E0..1F6EC, 1F6F0..1F6F3	27	L2/15-050R (Note: See also L2/13-207, L2/14-054, L2/14-063, L2/15-051A, L2/15-051B)		Davis, Mark; et al. (2015-01-29), Additional variation selectors for emoji
7.0	U+1F6C6..1F6CF, 1F6E0..1F6EC, 1F6F0..1F6F3	27	L2/15-301 (Note: See also L2/15-198 and L2/15-275)		Pournader, Roozbeh (2015-11-01), A proposal for 278 standardized variation sequences for emoji
7.0	U+1F6C6..1F6CF, 1F6E0..1F6EC, 1F6F0..1F6F3	27	L2/16-036		Davis, Mark (2016-01-24), Nameslist.txt suggestions
7.0	U+1F6C6..1F6CF, 1F6E0..1F6EC, 1F6F0..1F6F3	27	L2/16-228		Constable, Peter; Safran-Aasen, Judy; Coady, Michele; Bjornstad, Shelley (2016-08-04), Proposed Additions to Emoji_Modifier_Base
7.0	U+1F6C6..1F6CF, 1F6E0..1F6EC, 1F6F0..1F6F3	27	L2/16-203		Moore, Lisa (2016-08-18), "B.12.1.3", UTC #148 Minutes
8.0	U+1F6D0	1	L2/14-275		Edberg, Peter; et al. (2014-10-23), Emoji ad-hoc committee recommendations to UTC #141
8.0	U+1F6D0	1	L2/15-025	N4654	Anderson, Deborah (2014-10-30), Future Additions to ISO/IEC 10646
8.0	U+1F6D0	1	L2/14-235R3		Afshar, Shervin; Pournader, Roozbeh (2014-11-01), Emoji and Symbol Additions - Religious Symbols and Structures
8.0	U+1F6D0	1	L2/15-032R		Davis, Mark (2015-02-23), Recommended Disposition on Feedback for PRI 286 & related Emoji docs
9.0	U+1F6D1, 1F6F4..1F6F5	3	L2/14-085		Parrott, Katrina (2014-04-09), Request Approval to add "Our New iDiversicons: Diverse Emoji Characters" to the next updated Unicode Standard
9.0	U+1F6D1, 1F6F4..1F6F5	3	L2/14-154R		Parrott, Katrina; Afshar, Shervin (2014-08-05), Report on Diversity Emoji Use in iDiversicons and Proposal to Add New Emoji from iDiversicons Collection to Unicode
9.0	U+1F6D1, 1F6F4..1F6F5	3	L2/14-174R		Davis, Mark; Edberg, Peter (2014-08-27), Emoji Additions
9.0	U+1F6D1, 1F6F4..1F6F5	3	L2/14-172R		Davis, Mark; Edberg, Peter (2014-08-29), Proposed enhancements for emoji characters: background
9.0	U+1F6D1, 1F6F4..1F6F5	3	L2/14-275		Edberg, Peter; et al. (2014-10-23), Emoji ad-hoc committee recommendations to UTC #141
9.0	U+1F6D1, 1F6F4..1F6F5	3	L2/14-282		Parrott, Katrina (2014-10-28), iDiversicons Proposed Emoji Additions Extracted from L2/14-154R
9.0	U+1F6D1, 1F6F4..1F6F5	3	L2/15-048		Parrott, Katrina; et al. (2015-01-31), Adding gender counterparts to emoji list?
9.0	U+1F6D1, 1F6F4..1F6F5	3	L2/15-058		Afshar, Shervin (2015-02-01), Comparing MSN Messenger Smiley Set to Unicode Emoji
9.0	U+1F6D1, 1F6F4..1F6F5	3	L2/15-059		Afshar, Shervin (2015-02-01), Comparing Yahoo Messenger Smiley Set to Unicode Emoji
9.0	U+1F6D1, 1F6F4..1F6F5	3	L2/15-054R5		Cummings, Craig (2015-05-08), Emoji Additions: Animals, Compatibility, and More Popular Requests
9.0	U+1F6D2	1	L2/15-195R2		Emoji Additions Tranche 6: More Popular Requests and Gap Filling, 2015-07-28
9.0	U+1F6D2	1	L2/15-187		Moore, Lisa (2015-08-11), "E.1.1", UTC #144 Minutes
9.0	U+1F6F6	1	L2/15-196R4		Komatsu, Hiroyuki (2015-07-31), Proposal to add more sports-related emoji characters
9.0	U+1F6F6	1	L2/15-187		Moore, Lisa (2015-08-11), "E.1.2", UTC #144 Minutes
9.0	U+1F6F6	1	L2/17-161	N4794	Suignard, Michel (2017-05-08), "Ireland E13 (1F6F6 CANOE)", Draft disposition of comments on PDAM1.2 to ISO/IEC 10646 5th edition
10.0	U+1F6D3..1F6D4	2	L2/15-007	N4661	West, Andrew (2015-01-11), Proposal to encode five religious and cultural symbols
10.0	U+1F6D3..1F6D4	2	L2/15-017		Moore, Lisa (2015-02-12), "E3", UTC #142 Minutes
10.0	U+1F6F7	1	L2/16-127		Komatsu, Hiroyuki (2016-05-25), Proposal for more winter activity emojis
10.0	U+1F6F7	1	L2/16-369	N4805	Edberg, Peter (2016-11-10), Further emoji additions for Unicode 10, consolidated proposal
10.0	U+1F6F8 (Note: See also L2/16-369)	1	L2/16-206		Baker, Cody (2016-08-02), Flying Saucer Emoji
10.0	U+1F6F8	1	L2/17-161	N4794	Suignard, Michel (2017-05-08), "Ireland E14 (1F6F8 FLYING SAUCER)", Draft disposition of comments on PDAM1.2 to ISO/IEC 10646 5th edition
11.0	U+1F6F9	1	L2/15-061		Cummings, Craig (2015-01-31), Emoji Additions: Runner-ups
11.0	U+1F6F9	1	L2/16-378		Heard, Jaron (2016-11-20), Skateboarder emoji submission
11.0	U+1F6F9	1	L2/16-382		Bohorad, Nicole; Aschenbach, Sarah; Stenersen, Steve; Freudiger, Mike (2016-12-05), Lacrosse stick and ball emoji submission
11.0	U+1F6F9	1	L2/17-257		Bayer, Devin (2016-12-24), Flying Disc Emoji Proposal
11.0	U+1F6F9	1	L2/17-184		Hernandez, Vickie (2017-06-02), Proposal for "Softball" Emoji
11.0	U+1F6F9	1	L2/17-277		Karadeniz, Tayfun; et al. (2017-07-28), Emoji Sports Proposal for Unicode v11
11.0	U+1F6F9	1	L2/17-393		Anderson, Deborah (2017-10-22), Feedback from WG2 email discussion list on PDAM 2.2
11.0	U+1F6F9	1	L2/18-027		Burge, Jeremy; Moore, Lisa (2018-01-15), Response to feedback from WG2 email discussion list on PDAM 2.2
12.0	U+1F6D5	1	L2/17-298		Dalvi, Girish; Chaturvedi, Mayank (2017-08-07), Proposal for Hindu Temple Emoji
12.0	U+1F6D5	1	L2/17-380R		Emoji Subcommittee Report Q3 2017, 2017-10-23
12.0	U+1F6D5	1	L2/17-362		Moore, Lisa (2018-02-02), "Consensus 153-C26", UTC #153 Minutes
12.0	U+1F6D5	1	L2/18-143R2	N4960	Davis, Mark; et al. (2018-05-03), ESC Recommendations 2018Q2 (revised)
12.0	U+1F6D5	1	L2/18-115		Moore, Lisa (2018-05-09), "Consensus 155-C16 and Consensus 155-C18", UTC #155 Minutes
12.0	U+1F6D5	1	L2/18-234	N5008	Everson, Michael (2018-07-18), Feedback on draft candidates for Emoji 12.0 (L2/18-143R2)
12.0	U+1F6D5	1		N5020 (pdf, doc)	Umamaheswaran, V. S. (2019-01-11), "10.3.13", Unconfirmed minutes of WG 2 meeting 67
12.0	U+1F6FA	1	L2/17-362		Moore, Lisa (2018-02-02), "Consensus 153-C26", UTC #153 Minutes
12.0	U+1F6FA	1	L2/18-086		Pandey, Anshuman (2018-03-10), Proposal to encode the AUTO RICKSHAW emoji
12.0	U+1F6FA	1	L2/18-143R2	N4960	Davis, Mark; et al. (2018-05-03), ESC Recommendations 2018Q2 (revised)
12.0	U+1F6FA	1	L2/18-115		Moore, Lisa (2018-05-09), "Consensus 155-C16 and 155-C18", UTC #155 Minutes
12.0	U+1F6FA	1	L2/18-234	N5008	Everson, Michael (2018-07-18), Feedback on draft candidates for Emoji 12.0 (L2/18-143R2)
12.0	U+1F6FA	1	L2/18-253		Davis, Mark (2018-08-21), Comments on accumulated feedback on Unicode 12.0 draft candidates
12.0	U+1F6FA	1		N5020 (pdf, doc)	Umamaheswaran, V. S. (2019-01-11), "10.3.13", Unconfirmed minutes of WG 2 meeting 67
13.0	U+1F6D6	1	L2/19-102		Sunne, Samantha (February 2019), Proposal for Emoji: HUT
13.0	U+1F6D6	1	L2/19-190R (pdf, aux)	N5056	Davis, Mark (2019-04-30), Emoji Recommendations 2019Q2 (revised)
13.0	U+1F6D6	1	L2/19-122		Moore, Lisa (2019-05-08), "Consensus 159-C12", UTC #159 Minutes
13.0	U+1F6D7	1	L2/18-329 (Note: See also L2/19-190R, L2/19-122 (Consensus 159-C12))		Ingham-Smith, Kate (2018-11-15), Proposal for New Emoji: Elevator / Stairs
13.0	U+1F6FB	1	L2/18-260		Maggio, Nathan (2018-05-15), Proposal for new emoji PICKUP TRUCK
13.0	U+1F6FB	1	L2/18-307		"Provisional Candidate Proposals", ESC Recommendations for 2018Q4 UTC, 2018-09-18
13.0	U+1F6FB	1	L2/18-272		Moore, Lisa (2018-10-29), "Consensus 157-C11", UTC #157 Minutes
13.0	U+1F6FC	1	L2/19-151		Vandon, Raphaël; Indigo, Twixxi (2019-04-02), Proposal for a Roller Skate emoji
14.0	U+1F6DD	1	L2/20-215		Krenek, Christian (2020-03-31), Proposal for Emoji: Slide
14.0	U+1F6DD	1	L2/20-237		Moore, Lisa (2020-10-27), "Consensus 165-C23", UTC #165 Minutes
14.0	U+1F6DD	1	L2/20-242R2		Daniel, Jennifer (2020-10-07), Recommendations for Emoji, Unicode 14.0
14.0	U+1F6DE	1	L2/20-216 (Note: See also L2/20-242R2, L2/20-237 (Consensus 165-C23))		Joyce, Christine (2019-03-27), Proposal for Emoji: Tyre
14.0	U+1F6DF	1	L2/20-224		Shopsin, Tamara (May 2020), Life Preserver Emoji Proposal for Unicode 14.0
15.0	U+1F6DC	1	L2/21-191		Brinkmann, Lena; Chase, Bronwen (2020-07-08), Proposal for Emoji Wireless Connection
15.0	U+1F6DC	1	L2/21-172R		Daniel, Jennifer (2021-10-06), Emoji Subcommittee Report Q4, 2021
15.0	U+1F6DC	1	L2/21-167		Cummings, Craig (2022-01-27), "Consensus 169-C14", Approved Minutes of UTC Meeting 169, "Accept the repertoire of 21 provisional emoji candidates as documented in L2/21-172R"
17.0	U+1F6D8	1	L2/24-257		Daniel, Jennifer (2024-07-02), Falling Debris Emoji
17.0	U+1F6D8	1	L2/24-226R		Daniel, Jennifer (2024-11-06), Emoji Standard & Research Working Group Report for UTC #181 (2024Q4)
17.0	U+1F6D8	1	L2/24-221		Constable, Peter (2024-11-12), "Consensus 181-C5", UTC #181 Minutes, "Accept 8 new emoji characters"
18.0	U+1F6D9	1	L2/25-256		Cappelli, Thomas; Avinain, Pierre (2025-04-22), Proposal for Emoji: Lighthouse
18.0	U+1F6D9	1	L2/25-230R		Daniel, Jennifer (2025-10-28), "1. ESC Emoji Recommendations for Unicode 18.0", Emoji Standard & Research Working Group Report for UTC #185 (revised)
18.0	U+1F6D9	1	L2/25-226		"Consensus 185-C31", UTC #185 Minutes, 2025-10-29, "Accept [...] new emoji characters ..."
