= World Emoji Day =

Annual unofficial holiday

- The Unicode character U+1F4C6 📆 TEAR-OFF CALENDAR in the Noto Sans font
- Type: Unofficial international holiday
- Date: 17 July
- Next time: 17 July 2027
- Frequency: Annual or yearly
- First time: 17 July 2014; 12 years ago

World Emoji Day is an annual unofficial holiday occurring on 17 July each year, intended to celebrate emoji; in the years since the earliest observance, it has become a popular date to make product or other announcements and releases relating to emoji.

== Origins and celebrations ==
The date originally referred to the day Apple premiered its iCal calendar application in 2002. The day, 17 July, was displayed on the Apple Color Emoji version of the calendar emoji (📅) as an Easter egg.

World Emoji Day was created on 17 July 2014 by Jeremy Burge, the founder of Emojipedia.

The New York Times reported that Burge chose 17 July "based on the way the calendar emoji is shown on iPhones". For the first World Emoji Day, Burge told The Independent "there were no formal plans put in place" other than choosing the date. The Washington Post suggested in 2018 that readers use this day to "communicate with only emoji".

NBC reported that the day was X's top trending item on 17 July in 2015.

The observance emerged as emoji were gaining mainstream cultural recognition. In 2015 Oxford Dictionaries named the Face with Tears of Joy emoji its Word of the year, the first time a pictograph received the title, and in 2016 the Museum of Modern Art added the original 1999 NTT Docomo emoji set, designed by Shigetaka Kurita, to its permanent collection.

In 2016, Google changed the appearance of Unicode character U+1F4C5 📅 CALENDAR to display 17 July on Android, Gmail, Hangouts, and ChromeOS products. As of 2025, versions of the character which show 17 July include those of Apple, Samsung, Google, X, and JoyPixels. Some emoji sets (such as Microsoft's) do not specify a calendar date while other sets continue to display dates other than 17 July. Whatsapp (24 February) and Huawei (15 September) each display their respective company's founding dates while Facebook (14 May) displays its founder's birthday. X had previously used its launch date (15 July) and its founding date (21 March) in earlier versions of its emoji sets.

== Announcements ==
Since 2017, Apple has used each World Emoji Day to announce upcoming expansions to the range of emojis on iOS.

On World Emoji Day 2015, Pepsi launched PepsiMoji which included an emoji keyboard and custom World Emoji Day Pepsi cans and bottles. These were initially released in Canada and expanded to 100 markets in 2016.

In 2016, Sony Pictures Animation used World Emoji Day to announce T.J. Miller as the first cast member for The Emoji Movie, Google released "a series of new emoji that are more inclusive of women from diverse backgrounds", and Emojipedia launched the first World Emoji Awards. Other World Emoji Day announcements in 2016 came from Disney, General Electric, X, and Coca-Cola.

In 2017, London's Royal Opera House presented 20 operas and ballets in emoji form, Google announced the end of its blob emoji and winners of the World Emoji Awards were announced from the trading floor of the New York Stock Exchange and broadcast on Cheddar.

In 2018, Kim Kardashian released her Kimoji fragrance line on World Emoji Day, Apple previewed new emoji designs including redheads and replaced executive photos on its corporate leadership page with emojis, Google announced the return of "blob emojis" in sticker form, and Facebook announced that "700 million emojis are used in Facebook posts each day".

On World Emoji Day 2019, the award for Most Popular New Emoji was announced as the Smiling Face With Hearts In 2020 the Most Popular New Emoji was announced as the White Heart on Australia's The Morning Show.

Microsoft used World Emoji Day in 2021 to preview an overhaul to the Windows emoji set using the Fluent Design System for the first time. Facebook used World Emoji Day 2021 to announce Soundmojis, Google unveiled a solution for faster emoji updates on Android, and Emojipedia revealed sample images for the latest emoji draft list.

== Events ==
Maggie Gyllenhaal, Andrew Rannells and Olivia Palermo attended the Pepsi World Emoji Day Red Carpet event in 2016. In 2017, Paula Abdul, Maya Rudolph, Liam Aiken, Jeremy Burge and Fern Mallis at the Saks Fifth Avenue red carpet on World Emoji Day.

The Empire State Building was lit in "emoji yellow" for World Emoji Day in 2017, and the New York Stock Exchange Closing Bell was rung by Jake T. Austin of The Emoji Movie and Jeremy Burge from Emojipedia. A Guinness World Record was attempted in Dubai on World Emoji Day in 2017 for the "largest gathering of people dressed as emojis".

Musical Emojiland premiered off-broadway in New York City at The Acorn Theatre on World Emoji Day 2018 as part of the New York Musical Festival.

In 2019, the British Library hosted an event on World Emoji Day with Unicode president Mark Davis and Emojipedia founder Jeremy Burge discussing the future of emoji and the National Museum of Cinema in Turin launched the exhibition #FacceEmozioni 1500–2020: From Physiognomy to Emojis also on July 17.

In 2023, Emojipedia returned to the New York Stock Exchange with the customisation platform Zedge to mark the day and announce the year's most popular new emoji.

== In the news ==
In 2016, X noted that Australia's "emoji-loving" Foreign Minister Julie Bishop shared her birthday with World Emoji Day.

In 2017, US House Speaker Paul Ryan released a video on World Emoji Day claiming he "goes crazy on emojis" which was widely criticized.

In 2018, Adweek reported that social media posts from the United States Department of Defense, Army and Navy seemed like "an odd fit for the breezy joys" of World Emoji Day, while other outlets called these "a series of bleached, seemingly nothing tweets filled with a bunch of random emojis" and "the most terrible bastardization of an emoji".

In 2021, Tourism New Zealand used World Emoji Day to promote the concept of a kiwi emoji.
