= Emojipedia =

Online encyclopedia devoted to emoji characters

- The logo of Emojipedia, featuring an orange book with a yellow smiley face on the cover

- Screenshot The homepage in 2026 showing the most popularly used emojis
- Available in: 20 languages
- List of languages: Bengali; Chinese; Danish; Dutch; English; French; German; Hindi; Italian; Japanese; Korean; Malay; Marathi; Norwegian; Portuguese; Spanish; Swedish; Tamil; Telugu
- Editor: Keith Broni
- Parent: Zedge
- Website: emojipedia.org
- Launched: 2013; 13 years ago

Emojipedia is an emoji reference website which documents the meaning and common usage of emoji characters in the Unicode Standard. Most commonly described as an emoji encyclopedia or emoji dictionary, Emojipedia also publishes articles and provides tools for tracking new emoji characters, design changes and usage trends. It has been owned by Zedge since 2021. Emojipedia is a non-voting associate member of The Unicode Consortium.

== History ==
Jeremy Burge created Emojipedia in 2013, and told the Hackney Gazette "the idea came about when Apple added emojis to iOS 6, but failed to mention which ones were new". Emojipedia rose to prominence with the release of Unicode 7 in 2014, when The Register reported the "online encyclopedia of emojis has been chucked offline after vast numbers of people visited the site".

In 2015, Emojipedia entered its first partnership with Quartz to release an app that allowed users access previously-hidden country flag emojis on iOS. Emojipedia launched Adopt an Emoji in September 2015 as "an attempt to make the site free of display ads" according to Wired. This preceded a similar program by the Unicode Consortium in December 2015. The Emojipedia "Adopt an Emoji" program was shut down in November 2016, citing confusion for users and advertisers due to the similarity with Unicode's fundraising effort.

Emojipedia told Business Insider in early 2016 that it served "over 140 million page views" per year, and was profitable. In mid-2016, Emojipedia "urged Apple to rethink its plan to convert the handgun emoji symbol into a water pistol icon" citing cross-platform confusion. In 2017, The Library of Congress launched the Web Cultures Web Archive which featured a history of memes, gifs, and emojis from references including Emojipedia, Boing Boing and GIPHY.

The Sydney Morning Herald reported that the site served 23 million page views in October 2017. Total page views for 2013–2019 were said to have reached one billion by February 2019. The New Yorker reported Emojipedia served 50 million page views in April 2020.

In August 2021, Emojipedia was acquired by Zedge for an undisclosed amount. In February 2022, Keith Broni became Emojipedia's editor-in-chief, taking over from founder and chief emoji officer Jeremy Burge. The Washington Post described Broni as having "spent years researching social media sites to better understand how people employ emojis". In July 2022, Emojipedia added multi-language support for the first time by localizing the site into five languages. In October 2022, support for 13 more languages (including India's most spoken languages in celebration of Diwali) was introduced.

== News and analysis ==
In 2016, an Emojipedia analysis showed that the peach emoji is most commonly used to represent buttocks. In 2017, after Google CEO Sundar Pichai pledged to "drop everything" to update Android's burger emoji, Emojipedia revealed the cheese layering issue had been resolved. In 2018, Emojipedia revealed that Apple planned to "fix" its bagel emoji design by adding cream cheese, following user complaints.

A 2020 study by Emojipedia found that U+1F637 😷 FACE WITH MEDICAL MASK and U+1F9A0 🦠 MICROBE were most used to represent COVID-19. Also in 2020, Emojipedia revealed that Apple's forthcoming iOS update would change the mask-wearing emoji to display a smiling face. In January 2021, Emojipedia reported that U+1F602 😂 FACE WITH TEARS OF JOY had been declared an emoji "for boomers" on TikTok, and in March 2021, it published analysis showing U+1F62D 😭 LOUDLY CRYING FACE had become the most used emoji on Twitter.

== Cultural impact ==
In 2018, Portland Maine's Press Herald reported that Senator Angus King had endorsed a new lobster emoji but Emojipedia's design was called out as "anatomically incorrect" due to an incorrect number of legs. The number of legs on Emojipedia's lobster design was subsequently fixed in a future release. Slate reported this as "a victory for scientists and lobster fans everywhere". Skater Tony Hawk criticized Emojipedia's skateboard design as being "'mid-'80s ... beginner-level' board 'definitely not representative' of the modern sport" and subsequently worked with the company to produce an updated design. On BBC Radio 4, Stephen Fry described Emojipedia as "a kind of Académie française for your iPhone" when assessing its impact on the English language.

World Emoji Day is a holiday created by Emojipedia in 2014 which is held on 17 July each year. According to The New York Times, 17 July was chosen due to the design of the calendar emoji (on iOS) showing this date. Emojipedia used the second annual World Emoji Day to release EmojiVote as "an experiment in Emoji democracy". In 2017–2020, Apple used this event to preview new emojis for iOS. Emojipedia reveals the winners of the World Emoji Awards each year, with past announcements held live at the New York Stock Exchange and National Museum of Cinema.

In 2018, Emojipedia was presented in the Federal Court of Australia as "a reputable website in telling us how to interpret these faces" by a lawyer for Geoffrey Rush during a defamation case against Nationwide News. This was in the context of interpreting an emoji sent by Rush to a fellow actor, which Rush described as "the looniest emoji I could find". Rush said he would have used an emoji of Groucho Marx or The Muppets' Fozzie Bear if they had been available. Reports indicate Rush's lawyer "attempted to hand up to Justice Michael Wigney a printout of the emoji's meaning from Emojipedia" but a barrister for Nationwide News objected, stating it "doesn't matter what Emojipedia says the emoji is". Justice Wigney agreed that an emoji definition "is in the eye of the beholder": inferring the context within the message was more important than the Emojipedia definition.

In 2026, Emojipedia made its debut in the New York Times crossword.
