= Pistol emoji =

Emoji displayed as a weapon

Evolution of the pistol emoji as rendered by stock Android systems. From left to right: 2012 (pistol), 2013 (blunderbuss), 2014 (revolver), 2017 (revolver) and 2018 (water gun).

The pistol emoji (U+1F52B 🔫 PISTOL) is an emoji defined by the Unicode Consortium as depicting a "handgun" or "revolver".

It was historically displayed as a handgun on most computers (although Google once used a blunderbuss); as early as 2013, Microsoft chose to replace the glyph with a ray gun, and in 2016 Apple replaced their glyph with a water pistol. Since then, its rendering has been inconsistent across vendors. Microsoft changed its glyph back to an icon of a revolver during 2016 and 2017, before switching it to a (differently-styled) ray gun; in 2018, Google and Samsung changed their devices' rendering of the emoji to a water pistol, as well as the websites Facebook and Twitter. In 2024, Twitter (by then known as "X") chose to restore the glyph of a handgun, although instead of a revolver it used a semi-automatic M1911.

== Development and usage history ==
The pistol emoji was originally included in proprietary emoji sets from SoftBank Mobile and au by KDDI. In 2007, Apple encoded them using SoftBank's Private Use Area scheme. As part of a set of characters sourced from SoftBank, au by KDDI, and NTT Docomo emoji sets, the gun emoji was approved as part of Unicode 6.0 in 2010 under the name "Pistol". Global popularity of emojis then surged in the early to mid-2010s. The pistol emoji has been included in the Unicode Technical Standard for emoji (UTS #51) since its first edition (Emoji 1.0) in 2015.

Character information
Preview	🔫	
Unicode name	PISTOL	
Encodings	decimal	hex
Unicode	128299	U+1F52B
UTF-8	240 159 148 171	F0 9F 94 AB
UTF-16	55357 56619	D83D DD2B
GB 18030	148 57 231 51	94 39 E7 33
Numeric character reference	&#128299;	&#x1F52B;
Shift JIS (au by KDDI)	246 227	F6 E3
Shift JIS (SoftBank 3G)	247 83	F7 53
7-bit JIS (au by KDDI)	118 101	76 65
Emoji shortcode	:gun:	
Google name (pre-Unicode)	PISTOL	
CLDR text-to-speech name	water pistol	
Google substitute string	[ピストル]	

== Controversy and glyph changes ==
Original (left) and 2018 revised (right) Twitter designs, showing the transition from a revolver to a water pistol

Evolution of the pistol emoji on selected platforms

In August 2016, Apple announced that in iOS 10, their rendering of the pistol emoji would be changed from a revolver to a water pistol; Apple had previously put pressure on the Unicode Consortium not to approve a rifle emoji, with one consortium member quoted as saying "engineers that are concerned about standards and internationalization issues [...] now have to do something more in line with Apple or Google's marketing teams". Apple's change of glyph was criticized by others, among them the editor of Emojipedia, who did not support the change because it could lead to messages appearing differently to the receiver than the sender had intended.

One day after the glyph alteration by Apple, Microsoft pushed an update to Windows 10 that changed its longstanding depiction of the pistol emoji as a toy ray-gun to a real revolver, telling Engadget: "We will continue to work with the Unicode Consortium to refine and update glyphs that reflects [sic] customer needs, feedback and supports a consistent system that works across the digital world".

Insider's Rob Price said Apple's "plan to combat gun violence by changing an emoji" created the potential for "serious miscommunication across different platforms", and asked "What if a joke sent from an Apple user to a Google user is misconstrued because of differences in rendering? Or if a genuine threat sent by a Google user to an Apple user goes unreported because it is taken as a joke?" Margaret Rhodes of Wired said that "Apple's squirt gun emoji hides a big political statement." The Collegiate Times said that "the use of the firearm emoji does not always indicate gun violence." Jonathan Zittrain, in The New York Times, said that Apple should be no more responsible if someone uses a gun image in the abstract than if someone happens to type the word "gun." As late as December 2017, Apple and WhatsApp were the only vendors using a squirt gun; Google, Microsoft, Samsung, HTC, Facebook, Facebook Messenger, Twitter, EmojiOne and Mozilla's emoji sets used a revolver, whereas LG and emojidex used a pistol. By March 2018, Samsung had also adopted a squirt gun.

By April 2018, following the Parkland high school shooting and subsequent mass demonstrations in the United States against gun violence, several companies changed their renderings of the emoji to a water gun; at that time Apple, Samsung, WhatsApp and Twitter used squirt gun glyphs, while Google, Microsoft, Facebook, EmojiOne, Facebook Messenger, HTC and Mozilla used revolvers, and emojidex and LG used pistols.

By mid-2019, the pistol emoji was rendered as a revolver in the Facebook Messenger, HTC, Mozilla, and Softbank emoji sets, a pistol in the LG and Docomo emoji sets, and a squirt gun in the Apple, Google, Microsoft, Samsung, WhatsApp, Twitter and Facebook emoji sets; this remained the case through 2020, 2021, 2022, and 2023.

In July 2024, the pistol emoji on X (formerly Twitter) was changed back to represent a gun, specifically a Colt M1911, with site owner Elon Musk saying "Nerfing of the gun emoji matches rise of the woke mind virus, as a core tenet is equating fake harm with real harm."

== Criminal charges for use of pistol emoji ==
In 2015, a 12-year-old girl in Virginia faced felony charges, including "computer harassment", for threatening messages she had posted on Instagram that included the pistol emoji, alongside the knife and bomb emoji. In Brooklyn, New York the same year, a 17-year-old boy was charged for use of the pistol emoji in part of what was construed to be a threat. Elizabeth Nolan Brown, in Reason Magazine, said "Cops were dispatched to Aristy's house, which they searched, finding marijuana and a firearm. In addition to charges for making "terroristic threats" and "aggravated harassment," Aristy was also charged with drug and weapon possession. He was subsequently arraigned, with bail set at $150,000."

In 2016, a 22-year-old man in Drôme, France was jailed for 3 months and fined €1000 by a Valence court after sending his ex-girlfriend a gun emoji.
