= Jeremy Burge =

Founder of Emojipedia (born 1984)

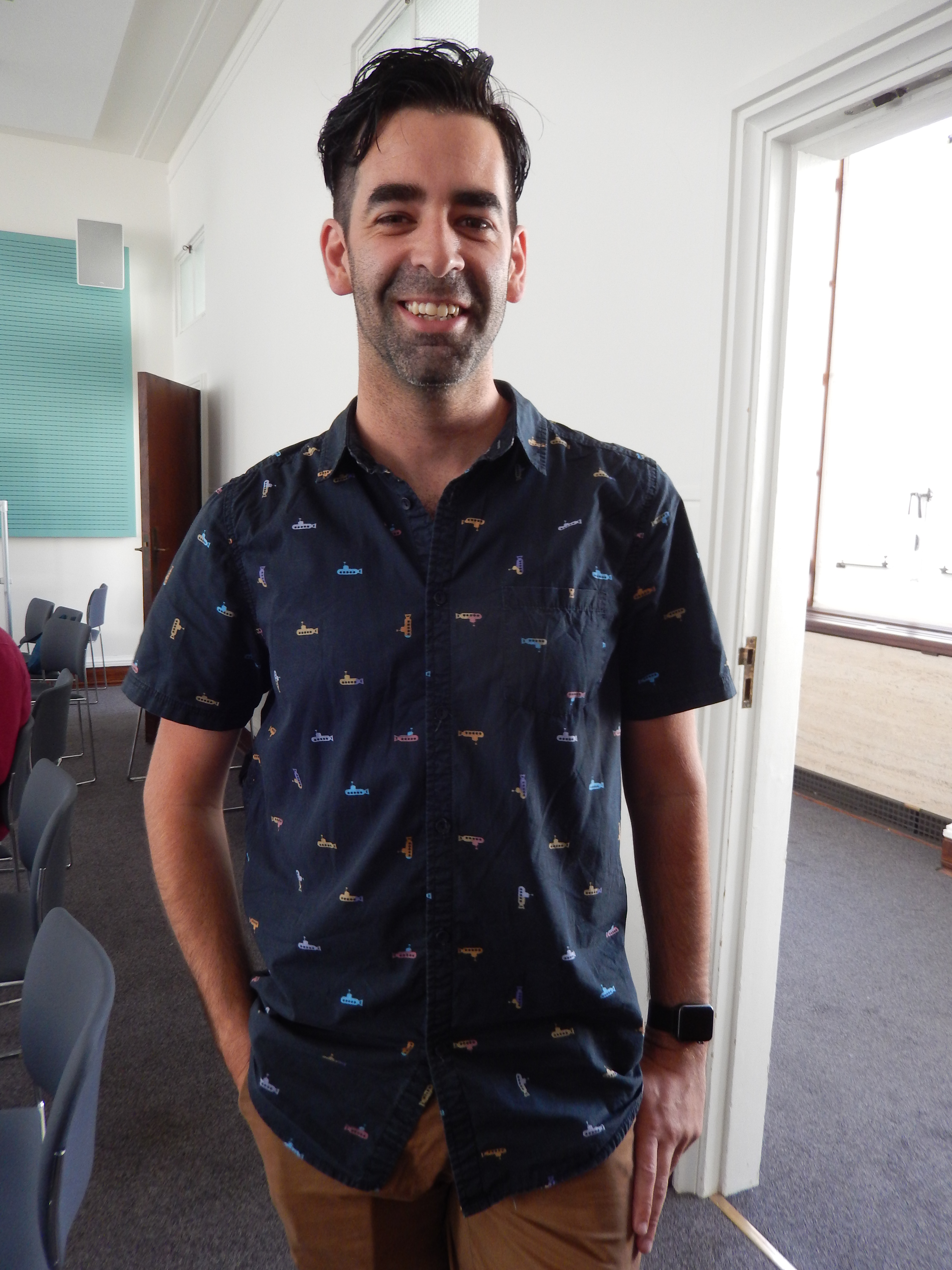
- Jeremy Burge at SOAS, University of London, June 2018
- Born: 14 July 1984 (age 42); Western Australia
- Occupations: Entrepreneur, blogger
- Known for: Founder of Emojipedia

Jeremy Burge (born 14 July 1984) is an Australian writer, entrepreneur and internet personality. He is the founder of Emojipedia and Express Transit.

Business Insider listed Burge in the UK Tech 100 in 2016, 2017 and 2018.

== Emojipedia ==
Burge created Emojipedia, started World Emoji Day, and is widely regarded as an expert on emoji. The Sydney Morning Herald reported that Emojipedia had 23 million page views per month in 2017.

Burge was Chief Emoji Officer at Emojipedia between 2016 and 2022, overseeing all editorial content. This title was described by The Telegraph in 2019 as "one of the most absurd job titles in tech". Business Insider referred to him as "The Emoji Maestro" while other publications have used terms such as "Emoji King" or "Lord of Emojis". The New Yorker dubbed Burge "The Samuel Johnson of Emoji" in 2020.

During his time at Emojipedia, Burge worked with professional athletes Tony Hawk and Sasha DiGiulian to improve the accuracy of Emojipedia's sample images for the skateboard and rock climber respectively. Jenken Magazine reported: "While they were on the phone one day, Hawk sent Burge a picture of his own board" which was used as the basis of Emojipedia's revised skateboard design.

In 2021, Emojipedia served over 500 million annual page views. Emojipedia was acquired by Zedge in August 2021 for an undisclosed amount.

=== Unicode ===
Burge was vice-chair of the Unicode Emoji Subcommittee from 2017 to 2019 and served on the Unicode Technical Committee from 2015 to 2021.

Speaking to Crikey in 2022, Burge spoke against superfluous emoji additions: "representation is important but I'm not sure we need another abacus or lab coat emoji".

=== World Emoji Day ===
World Emoji Day is a "global celebration of emoji" created by Burge in 2014. According to the New York Times, he created the day on "July 17 based on the way the calendar emoji is shown on iPhones". Tim Cook recognised the day in 2017.

In 2017, Burge discussed the origin of World Emoji Day and Emojipedia at AOL BUILD, attended the lighting of the Empire State Building "emoji yellow" with The Emoji Movie voice cast Patrick Stewart, Maya Rudolph and Jake T. Austin, and announced the winners of the annual World Emoji Awards from the New York Stock Exchange.

Saks Fifth Avenue hosted a "Saks Celebrates World Emoji Day" red carpet event in 2017 which was attended by Burge. On World Emoji Day 2019, Burge attended the launch of an exhibition at the National Museum of Cinema and spoke alongside Unicode Consortium co-founder Mark Davis at The British Library.

Burge claimed to "relax and enjoy it" in 2022, after stepping down from Emojipedia.

=== Emoji Wrap ===
Burge hosted Emoji Wrap, a podcast from Emojipedia covering "global emoji news and trends" between August 2016 and December 2020 interviewing guests including Mark Davis, Myke Hurley, Jason Snell and Christina Warren. The Guardian notes that Google product manager Agustin Fonts was "hesitant about shifting to a water pistol" when discussing the Android gun emoji with Burge on the Emoji Wrap podcast.

== Writing and Podcasting ==
Burge was a regular news contributor to Emojipedia 2014–2020 and was responsible for many of the initial emoji definitions on the reference website. Additionally he has written for publications such Six Colors, Medium, and The Internet Review.

In 2019, Burge raised the issue of Facebook using user-submitted phone numbers for undocumented purposes, and in 2020, he identified TikTok accessing user clipboard data on every keystroke.

In August 2023, Radio New Zealand reported that Burge was writing for Mobile Tech Journal. As of 2026, Burge writes regular news and analysis on public transport on Express Transit.

Since 2017, Burge has appeared frequently on podcasts from Relay As of 2026, Burge is a regular contributor covering transport for ABC Radio Melbourne.

== Public speaking ==
The Evening Standard reported that Burge "lectured on the history and social impact of emojis" at TEDxEastEnd at London's Hackney Empire in 2017. Burge has spoken at conferences such as The Next Web in Amsterdam, Smart Future in Riga, Design Matters in Copenhagen and Úll in Killarney.

Institutions that have hosted Burge include Eton College, Eye Magazine, Google, London Design Museum, The British Library, and University College London.

== Personal life ==
Burge was born in Western Australia, and educated at Assumption College, Kilmore before graduating from Deakin University. In 2019 Burge moved onto a 53 ft narrowboat named Dottie M and gained popularity on TikTok with viral videos navigating rivers and canals of the United Kingdom.

In 2024, Burge told the Sydney Morning Herald he was splitting his time living between the UK and Melbourne, Australia.

Burge was caught in a power outage in Wallingford, UK, in 2025.
