= Zedge =

Content distribution platform

- Developer: Zedge
- Release: 2003
- Operating system: Android, iOS, Windows Phone, Web
- Available in: English
- Type: Content Discovery Platform
- Website: www.zedge.net

Zedge is a content distribution platform that provides consumers with a way to personalize their mobile devices. It has offices in Trondheim, Vilnius, and New York City.

As of February 2, 2023, the Zedge app has been downloaded over 436 million times and has approximately 30 million monthly active users.

== History ==
Zedge, Inc.
- Type: Public
- Traded as: AMEX: ZDGE
- Industry: App
- Founded: Trondheim, Norway (2003)
- Founder: Tom Arnøy, Kenneth Sundnes, and Paul Shaw
- Headquarters: Trondheim, Norway
- Area served: Worldwide
- Revenue: ▼US$29.4 million (2025)
- Net income: ▲ −US$2.39 million (2025)
- Website: zedge.net

Zedge was founded by Tom Arnøy, Kenneth Sundnes, and Paul Shaw in Norway in 2003. In June 2016, Zedge, Inc. — Zedge's parent company — was spun off from IDT as a publicly traded company listed on the New York Stock Exchange.

The company has expanded with the launch of Shortz, a mobile app, in 2019. In 2021, Zedge acquired online emoji encyclopedia Emojipedia. In 2022, Zedge acquired photography and mobile gaming company GuruShots.

== Services ==
Zedge offers a variety of customization options, including ringtones, wallpapers, home screen app icons, widgets, and notification sounds. Artists can launch a virtual storefront in Zedge, allowing them to market and sell their content to Zedge's global user base.

== Recognition ==
In 2013, Zedge was recognized as one of Time's Best 50 Android Apps.
