= Face with Tears of Joy emoji =

Emoji featuring laughing crying face

Left: The emoji as it appears on Twemoji, which has been used on X, Discord, Roblox and other platforms; and right: the emoji as it appears on the Fluent UI.

Face with Tears of Joy (😂) is an emoji depicting a face crying with laughter. It is part of the Emoticons block of Unicode and was added to the Unicode Standard in 2010 in Unicode 6.0, the first Unicode release intended to release emoji characters. One of the most popular emojis, Face with Tears of Joy was chosen as the Word of the Year by Oxford Dictionaries in 2015. It is used to express joy and the feeling of intense laughter.

== Development history ==
In general terms, emoji development dates back to the late 1990s in Japan. By 2010, when the Unicode Consortium was compiling a unified collection of characters from the Japanese cellular emoji sets, which would be included with the release of Unicode 6.0, a face with tears of joy was included in the au by KDDI and SoftBank Mobile emoji sets. Unicode released the set in 2010, but Apple first developed its emoji keyboard for the Japanese market and released it in Japan in 2008 on iPhone OS 2.2, initially using the Softbank Private Use Area scheme prior to standard Unicode codepoints being assigned. The Tears of Joy emoji was released on Apple devices worldwide in 2011, following an iOS update.

== Popularity ==
Following the emoji's 2011 release on iOS, as well as other providers and online platforms similarly adopting emoji keyboards, there was a general emoji usage boom. In the mid-2010s, the "Face with Tears emoji" in particular became mainstream; by 2013, a piece in Complex described the emoji's use as almost at "complete saturation". In 2014, FiveThirtyEight noted that Face with Tears of Joy was the second most used emoji on Twitter, appearing in 278 million tweets, only behind U+2665 ♥️ BLACK HEART SUIT, which appeared in 342 million.

The next year, Oxford University Press and SwiftKey found that Face with Tears of Joy was globally the most used emoji of the year. As such, it was chosen as Oxford Dictionaries' Word of the Year, with the dictionary stating the emoji was the morpheme that "best reflected the ethos, mood, and preoccupations of 2015." Their research had found the emoji made up 20% of all emojis used in the UK, and 17% of those in the US, up from 4% and 9% respectively from 2014. Oxford Dictionaries president Caspar Grathwohl explained Oxford's choice, stating, "emoji are becoming an increasingly rich form of communication, one that transcends linguistic borders", further explaining that they chose Face with Tears of Joy for the way it embodied the "playfulness and intimacy" of emojis, which had become mainstream that year.

During 2015, Instagram and Twitter released data showing the emoji was the most popular on their platforms, being used over 6.6 billion times on the latter. In 2017, the Face with Tears of Joy emoji was the most used emoji globally and in the UK on Facebook, and one of the top three most used globally on the Messenger app. Additionally, SwiftKey announced that the emoji was the most used in the United Kingdom during 2016. In 2017, Time reported that for the third consecutive year the emoji was the most popular on social media.

The emoji started to decline in popularity around the early 2020s as Generation Z began to associate it with older generations, perceiving it as "uncool". It was largely replaced by U+1F62D 😭 LOUDLY CRYING FACE and the skull emoji (U+1F480 💀 SKULL) to express similar emotions among people in their mid-20s and younger; when they did use it, they did so ironically, sending it in repetition for exaggeration. The emoji continued to be used sincerely by millennials. As it decreased in use, in 2021 it briefly stopped being the most popular Twitter emoji.

== Analysis ==
Responding to "😂" becoming Oxford's 2015 word of the year for Slate, Katy Waldman wrote that the emoji was "less of a word" and more an opportunity for people to insert their own meanings, citing the emoji's "intense and inscrutable emotional lability". Fred Benenson, author of Emoji Dick, has given various reasons for the emoji's popularity, including its ability to convey joy and the emotion of "I'm laughing so hard I'm crying", both "basic, common" emotions and for its representation being better designed than many other Apple emojis. Abi Wilkinson, writing for The Guardian, opined that the Face with Tears of Joy emoji is "the worst emoji of all", describing it as "obnoxious" and "chortling".

Ilaria Moschini, writing for the journal Hermes, says that the drops of water in the emoji can be read as consistent with a broader visual tradition popular in manga: the water drop. These are representations of a large water drop which gain different meanings when placed on different parts of the face, including to represent physiological and inner states. She writes that in creating "😂", this element of Japanese visual tradition was synthesized with the American cultural tradition of smile face pins.

== In literature ==
In 2020, French writer Frédéric Beigbeder published a novel called L'Homme qui pleure de rire ("The man who cries with laughter"). On the book cover, the emoji 😂 is used in place of the title.

In July 2025, British author Keith Houston published a history of emojis, emoticons, and other expressive punctuation titled Face with Tears of Joy.

== Encoding ==
Character information
Preview	😂	
Unicode name	FACE WITH TEARS OF JOY	
Encodings	decimal	hex
Unicode	128514	U+1F602
UTF-8	240 159 152 130	F0 9F 98 82
UTF-16	55357 56834	D83D DE02
GB 18030	148 57 252 56	94 39 FC 38
Numeric character reference	&#128514;	&#x1F602;
Shift JIS (au by KDDI)	244 104	F4 68
Shift JIS (SoftBank 3G)	251 82	FB 52
7-bit JIS (au by KDDI)	123 73	7B 49
Emoji shortcode	:joy:	
Google name (pre-Unicode)	HAPPY FACE 5	
CLDR text-to-speech name	face with tears of joy	

== See also ==
- Poop emoji
- LOL
