= Skull emoji =

Emoji representing a human skull

Skull emoji as it appears in Google's Noto Project

The skull emoji (U+1F480 💀 SKULL) is an emoji depicting a human skull. It was added to Unicode's Emoticon block in October 2010. Originally representing death or goth subculture, the emoji grew to represent a wide range of emotions by the early 2020s, including joy, laughter, "I'm dead from laughter", and embarrassment. It is especially popular among members of Generation Z and Generation Alpha.

== Development ==
An emoji depicting a skull was originally included in the proprietary emoji sets from SoftBank Mobile and au by KDDI. Using these sets as a source, the Unicode Consortium included the skull emoji in their Unicode 6.0 standard, released in October 2010. Prior to that, the skull emoji was available for iPhone users in Japan, initially using a specific Private Use Area for compatibility with SoftBank's set. Following the discovery that installing Japanese apps unlocked the emoji keyboard, Apple released emoji support worldwide in 2011.

== Evolution of meaning and usage ==
Throughout the 2010s, the skull emoji retained its original meaning, symbolizing death or goth subculture. In 2016, Wired reported that people were more likely to use the skull emoji when they posted online about their phones being broken, signifying that they are "socially dead". The emoji had limited popularity, ranking 92nd among the most used emojis on Twitter in 2015. It reached the top 10 in the United States by 2019, but remained outside the top 50 in other countries.

In the early 2020s, the skull emoji was popularized by Generation Z who started using it as a replacement for the phrases "I'm dead" or "I'm dying" – short for "I'm dying of laughter" – to express joy or happiness, as well as laughter. They viewed Face with Tears of Joy emoji, the emoji previously used to convey these emotions, as "uncool", due to its association with older generations. Before this meaning of the skull emoji became popular, in 2015, U+1F47B 👻 GHOST was used instead. Over time, the skull emoji has evolved to represent a wide range of emotions, including embarrassment. By the start of 2025, the skull emoji's popularity had waned, in favor of other emojis with similar meanings like the (U+1F940 🥀 WILTED FLOWER) emoji.

== Reception ==
Adam Aleksic of The Washington Post viewed the skull emoji as a symbol that represents humor or irony and believed that it became a punctuation mark. Comparing the emoji to a tone tag, he wrote: "Punctuating the text with a skull lightens the tone and signals humility".

Kayleigh Dray of Stylist thought the popularization of the skull emoji was related to the COVID-19 pandemic and the "dystopian pandemic nightmare" it resulted in. "The laugh-cry emoji has died a sad little death and been replaced with an ever-so-appropriate skull", wrote the journalist.

== Encoding ==
Character information
Preview	💀	
Unicode name	SKULL	
Encodings	decimal	hex
Unicode	128128	U+1F480
UTF-8	240 159 146 128	F0 9F 92 80
UTF-16	55357 56448	D83D DC80
GB 18030	148 57 214 50	94 39 D6 32
Numeric character reference	&#128128;	&#x1F480;
Shift JIS (au by KDDI)	246 209	F6 D1
Shift JIS (SoftBank 3G)	247 92	F7 5C
7-bit JIS (au by KDDI)	118 83	76 53
Emoji shortcode	:skull:	
Google name (pre-Unicode)	SKULL	
CLDR text-to-speech name	skull	
Google substitute string	[どくろ]	

== See also ==
- LOL
- Glossary of Generation Z slang
- Wilted rose emoji
