= Osage script =

Alphabet invented for writing the Osage language

Osage 𐓏𐓘𐓻𐓘𐓻𐓟 𐒻𐓟
- Script type: Alphabet
- Creator: Herman Mongrain Lookout
- Period: 2006–present
- Direction: Left-to-right
- Languages: Osage

Related scripts
- Parent systems: (Proto-writing): Egyptian hieroglyphs; Proto-Sinaitic alphabet; Phoenician alphabet; Greek alphabet; Old Italic script; Latin script; English alphabet; Osage

ISO 15924
- ISO 15924: Osge (219), Osage

Unicode
- Unicode alias: Osage
- Unicode range: U+104B0–U+104FF

The Osage script is a script promulgated in 2006 and revised 2012–2014 for the Osage language. Because Latin orthographies were subject to interference from English conventions among Osage students who were more familiar with English than with Osage, in 2006 the director of the Osage Language Program, Herman Mongrain Lookout, decided to create a distinct script by modifying or fusing Latin letters. This Osage script has been in regular use on the Osage Nation ever since.

In 2012, while in the process of submitting the script to Unicode, a more precise representation of the sounds of Osage was formulated, and by the following year had been adequately tested. In February 2014, a conference on standardizing the reforms was held by Lookout and the staff at the Osage Nation Language Department along with UCS expert Michael Everson. The result included the introduction of case, the abolition of two letters, and the creation of several more.

The Osage script was included in Unicode version 9.0 in June 2016 in the Osage block. It featured on the 2023 USA quarter dollar commemorating Maria Tallchief.

== Letters ==
=== Vowels ===
The 2014 vowel letters are as follows:

Osage vowels
Oral		Nasal	
Osage	Latin	Osage	Latin
𐒰 𐓘	A a	𐒰͘ 𐓘͘	Ą ą
𐒱 𐓙	Ai ai	𐒲 𐓚	Aį aį
𐒳 𐓛	Ə ə	𐒳͘ 𐓛͘	Ə̨ ə̨
𐒷 𐓟	E e	𐒸 𐓠	Eį eį
𐒻 𐓣	I i	𐒻͘ 𐓣͘	Į į
𐓂 𐓪	O o	𐓂͘ 𐓪͘	Ǫ ǫ
		𐓃 𐓫	Oį oį
𐓎 𐓶	U u		

Long vowels are indicated with a macron, high tone by an acute accent, and a long vowel with high tone by a double acute accent: e.g. oral ⟨𐒰̄ 𐓘̄⟩ Ā ā, ⟨𐒰́ 𐓘́⟩ Á á, ⟨𐒰̋ 𐓘̋⟩ Ā́ ā́, nasal ⟨𐒰̄͘ 𐓘̄͘⟩ Ą̄ ą̄, ⟨𐒰́͘ 𐓘́͘⟩ Ą́ ą́, ⟨𐒰̋͘ 𐓘̋͘⟩ Ą̄́ ą̄́.

All vowel letters can take the nasal dot, but ⟨𐒷 𐓟⟩ and ⟨𐓎 𐓶⟩ almost never do (although ⟨𐒷 𐓟⟩ is nasalised in ⟨𐒸 𐓠⟩). All inflected forms are:

Osage Vowel Characters
		𐒰 [ɑ]		𐒱 [ai̯]		𐒳 [ə]		𐒷 [ɛ], [ɛi̯]		𐒻 [i]		𐓂 [ou̯]		𐓃 [õĩ̯]		𐓎 [ʊ̈ʉ̯]	
		short	long	short	long	short	long	short	long	short	long	short	long	short	long	short	long
oral	base	𐒰 𐓘	𐒰̄ 𐓘̄	𐒱 𐓙	𐒱̄ 𐓙̄	𐒳 𐓛	𐒳̄ 𐓛̄	𐒷 𐓟	𐒷̄ 𐓟̄	𐒻 𐓣	𐒻̄ 𐓣̄	𐓂 𐓪	𐓂̄ 𐓪̄			𐓎 𐓶	𐓎̄ 𐓶̄
oral	high tone	𐒰́ 𐓘́	𐒰̋ 𐓘̋	𐒱́ 𐓙́	𐒱̋ 𐓙̋	𐒳́ 𐓛́	𐒳̋ 𐓛̋	𐒷́ 𐓟́	𐒷̋ 𐓟̋	𐒻́ 𐓣́	𐒻̋ 𐓣̋	𐓂́ 𐓪́	𐓂̋ 𐓪̋			𐓎́ 𐓶́	𐓎̋ 𐓶̋
nasal	base	𐒰͘ 𐓘͘	𐒰̄͘ 𐓘̄͘	𐒲 𐓚	𐒲̄ 𐓚̄	𐒳͘ 𐓛͘	𐒳̄͘ 𐓛̄͘	𐒸 𐓠	𐒸̄ 𐓠̄	𐒻͘ 𐓣͘	𐒻̄͘ 𐓣̄͘	𐓂͘ 𐓪͘	𐓂̄͘ 𐓪̄͘	𐓃 𐓫	𐓃̄ 𐓫̄		
nasal	high tone	𐒰́͘ 𐓘́͘	𐒰̋͘ 𐓘̋͘	𐒲́ 𐓚́	𐒲̋ 𐓚̋	𐒳́͘ 𐓛́͘	𐒳̋͘ 𐓛̋͘	𐒸́ 𐓠́	𐒸̋ 𐓠̋	𐒻́͘ 𐓣́͘	𐒻̋͘ 𐓣̋͘	𐓂́͘ 𐓪́͘	𐓂̋͘ 𐓪̋͘	𐓃́ 𐓫́	𐓃̋ 𐓫̋		

Ə and Ə̨ are not phonemic, but unstressed allophones of A and Ą.

The a comes from Latin ⟨A⟩ (without the crossbar, as in the NASA insignia "worm" logo), e from Latin cursive ⟨Ɑ⟩ (the 'long' sound of the English letter a is rather like Osage e). The source for i is obscure, though Latin ⟨I⟩ does appear inside ⟨Λ⟩ for the diphthong ai.

=== Consonants ===
The 2014 consonant letters and digraphs are as follows. As in Latin orthography, the ejective consonants are written with a diacritic, and the strongly aspirated stops with digraphs. The pre-aspirated stops were originally written as digraphs with h, but since they vary by dialect with geminates, the 2014 revision included new letters for them derived by adding a cross-bar.

Osage consonants
Tenuis		Ejective		Aspirated		Pre-aspirated /geminate	
Osage	Latin	Osage	Latin	Osage	Latin	Osage	Latin
𐒴 𐓜	Br						
𐒵 𐓝	Č					𐒶 𐓞	Hč
𐒹 𐓡	H						
𐒺 𐓢	Hy						
𐒼 𐓤	K	𐒼ʼ 𐓤ʼ	Kʼ	𐒼𐓐 𐓤𐓸 𐒼𐓇 𐓤𐓯	Kx; Kš	𐒽 𐓥	Hk
𐒾 𐓦	Ky						
𐒿 𐓧	L						
𐓀 𐓨	M						
𐓁 𐓩	N						
𐓄 𐓬	P	𐓄ʼ 𐓬ʼ	Pʼ	𐓄𐓐 𐓬𐓸 𐓄𐓇 𐓬𐓯	Px; Pš	𐓅 𐓭	Hp
𐓆 𐓮	S						
𐓇 𐓯	Š						
𐓈 𐓰	T			𐓈𐓐 𐓰𐓸 𐓌 𐓴	Tx; Ch	𐓉 𐓱	Ht
𐓊 𐓲	C (Ts)	𐓊ʼ 𐓲ʼ	Cʼ	𐓈𐓐 𐓰𐓸 𐓌 𐓴	Tx; Ch	𐓋 𐓳	Hc
𐓍 𐓵	Ð						
𐓏 𐓷	W						
𐓐 𐓸	X						
𐓑 𐓹	Ɣ (gh)						
𐓒 𐓺	Z						
𐓓 𐓻	Ž						

Px and pš are allophones, as are kx ~ kš and tx ~ ch (tsh). Hy and ky are sequences rather than single consonants.

The source of 𐓄 is Latin ⟨P⟩ + ⟨b⟩, that of 𐓈 is Latin ⟨T⟩ + ⟨D⟩, 𐒼 from ⟨K⟩ + ⟨g⟩, 𐒴 from ⟨b⟩ + ⟨R⟩. 𐓆 and 𐓒 are the top halves of ⟨S⟩ and ⟨Z⟩. 𐓊 is from Osage ⟨𐓈⟩ + ⟨𐓆⟩. 𐒵, 𐓍, 𐓇 and 𐓓 are derived from Latin ⟨C⟩, ⟨T⟩, ⟨S⟩, and ⟨Z⟩ respectively, + ⟨h⟩. 𐓀, 𐓁 and 𐒿 appear to be from their cursive Latin forms. 𐓏 is a partial ⟨W⟩. 𐓐 is from cursive ⟨X⟩; it was originally at a 45-degree (x-like) angle before it was split into 𐓐 and inverted 𐓑. 𐒹 is possibly from the Spanish use of ⟨J⟩ as /x/; alternatively 𐒺 may be from the ⟨S⟩ of ⟨𐓇⟩, and 𐒹 from 𐒺. Ligatures for sc (sts) and sk were retired when the alphabet was reformed for Unicode encoding.

== Punctuation ==
Words are separated by a space. Syllables were originally separated by a full stop, but that practice has ceased with increasing literacy.

== 2014 reforms ==
A meeting to reform the script in 2014 in preparation for Unicode encoding agreed on five changes:

- Casing pairs were introduced.
- Digraphs hC (or superscript ʰC) for the pre-aspirate consonants were replaced with dedicated letters, Ꞓ.
- Ligatures for sc (sts) and sk were retired.
- The nasal marks (ˆ following the letter for monophthongs, an underscore for diphthongs) were replaced by a dot (above-right for monophthongs, internally for diphthongs)
- The ambiguous letter x, originally set at a 45-degree angle, was split into two letters, upright 𐓸 x and inverted 𐓹 gh.

== Unicode ==
The Osage alphabet was added to the Unicode Standard in June 2016 with the release of version 9.0.

The Unicode block for Osage is U+104B0–U+104FF:

Osage^{[1]}^{[2]} Official Unicode Consortium code chart (PDF)
	0	1	2	3	4	5	6	7	8	9	A	B	C	D	E	F
U+104Bx	𐒰	𐒱	𐒲	𐒳	𐒴	𐒵	𐒶	𐒷	𐒸	𐒹	𐒺	𐒻	𐒼	𐒽	𐒾	𐒿
U+104Cx	𐓀	𐓁	𐓂	𐓃	𐓄	𐓅	𐓆	𐓇	𐓈	𐓉	𐓊	𐓋	𐓌	𐓍	𐓎	𐓏
U+104Dx	𐓐	𐓑	𐓒	𐓓					𐓘	𐓙	𐓚	𐓛	𐓜	𐓝	𐓞	𐓟
U+104Ex	𐓠	𐓡	𐓢	𐓣	𐓤	𐓥	𐓦	𐓧	𐓨	𐓩	𐓪	𐓫	𐓬	𐓭	𐓮	𐓯
U+104Fx	𐓰	𐓱	𐓲	𐓳	𐓴	𐓵	𐓶	𐓷	𐓸	𐓹	𐓺	𐓻				
Notes 1.As of Unicode version 17.0 2.Grey areas indicate non-assigned code points
