= Fred Benenson =

American programmer, entrepreneur and photographer

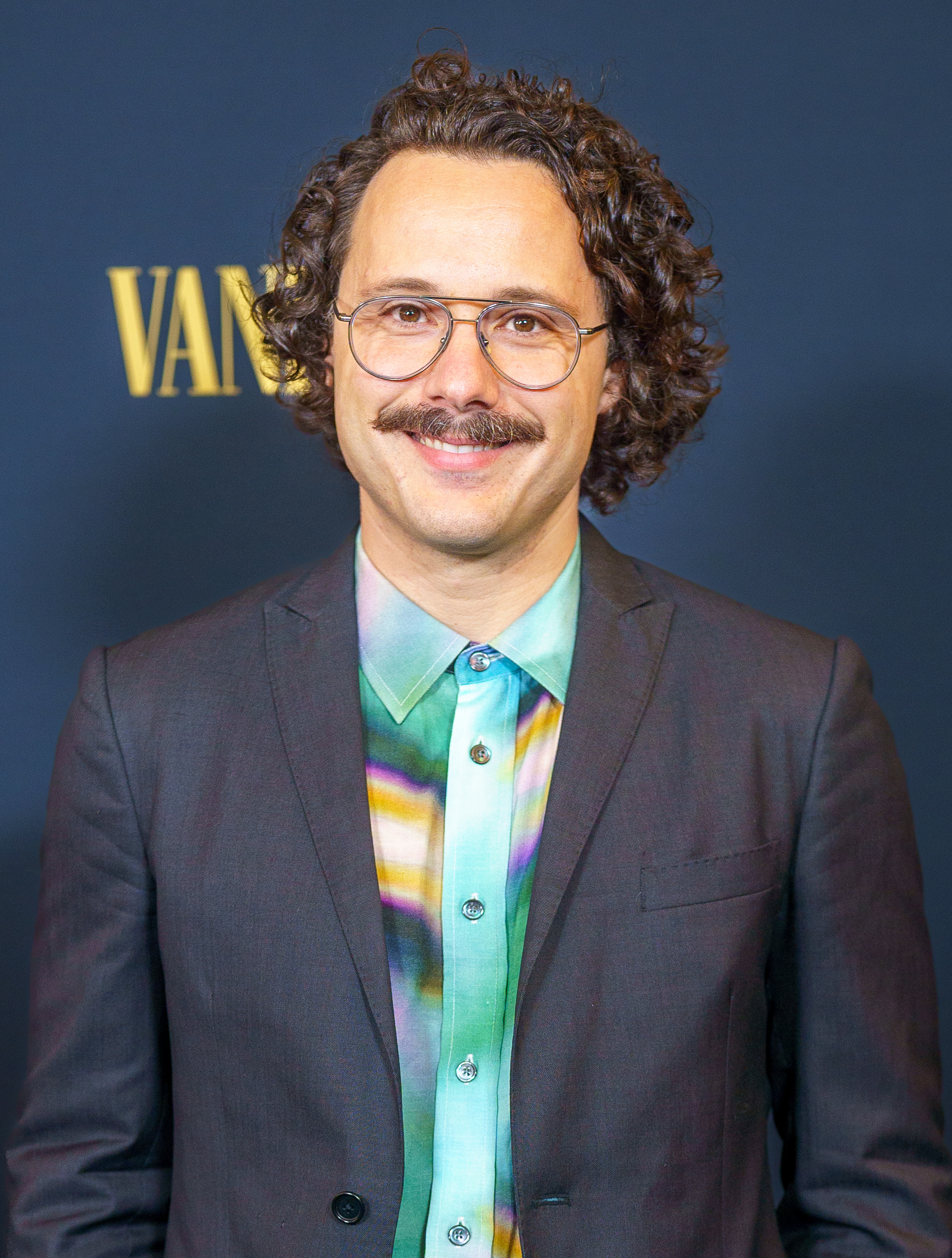
- Benenson in 2024
- Education: New York University (BA); New York University (MPS)
- Occupations: Programmer, Entrepreneur, Writer
- Notable work: Emoji Dick; Talk Emoji to Me
- Website: fredbenenson.com

Fred Benenson is an American programmer, founder, entrepreneur, and writer. He was the second employee of Kickstarter and worked at Y Combinator. His writing has appeared in The Atlantic, WIRED, and the Los Angeles Times, and in 2009, he created Emoji Dick, an emoji translation of Moby-Dick which was acquired by the Library of Congress in 2013.

Benenson is currently a General Partner at Twenty Two Ventures, a venture capital firm, and serves on the board of Rhizome.

== Early life and education ==
Benenson is the son of real estate investor Frederick Benenson and has one brother. From 2001 to 2005, Benenson studied philosophy and computer science at New York University. As an undergraduate, he cofounded Free Culture @ NYU, a collegiate chapter of Students for Free Culture. In 2008, he began his Masters of Professional Studies degree in Interactive Telecommunications at New York University's Tisch School.

== Career ==
In 2008, as a master's student at New York University, Benenson began a role at Creative Commons. He was also a research associate at Eyebeam. One year later, in 2009, Benenson became the second hire at Kickstarter and went on to serve as its Vice President of Data. From that year to 2010, Benenson served as an adjunct instructor in the Media, Culture, and Communication department at New York University.

In 2011, Benenson wrote and published Emoji Dick, an emoji translation of Herman Melville's Moby-Dick using Amazon Mechanical Turk, with support from a Kickstarter fundraiser, which was later acquired by the Library of Congress in 2013. Asked about his motive for doing so, Benenson told Technically Media that he wanted to see "what it would be like to take a magnificent achievement of novel-writing and try to boil it down to this relatively new way of expressing ourselves." In 2012, Benenson's emoji-based image of Eustace Tilley was showcased along with other submissions to The New Yorker's sixth annual Eustace Tilley contest. Later, in 2015, Benenson released the book How to Speak Emoji.

In 2016, Benenson joined Y Combinator. The next year, in 2017, he and Alex Hague, whom he met at XOXO, released the game Pitch Deck, a card game in which players pitch startup ideas to one another. The game was conceived by Benenson in 2015, and for the next two years, Benenson and Hague developed the concept through multiple iterations before releasing it with support from a Kickstarter fundraiser. According to The Creative Independent, the project drew inspiration from startup culture and aimed to parody the language of venture capital pitches, using improvisation as its core mechanic. Forbes described the game as a humorous reflection on the excesses of tech entrepreneurship and praised its straightforward, party-style gameplay.

In 2018, Benenson left Y Combinator to return to Kickstarter as a Kickstarter Fellow in order to work on the platform's creator dashboard. Two years later, in 2020, Benenson created and founded Breadwinner, a company specializing in an IoT device meant to track and monitor the growth and status of sourdough starter.

In 2017, Benenson pitched the "Oyster with Pearl" emoji as a submission to the Unicode Consortium. It was rejected at first but eventually included in Unicode 12.0 in 2019.

Benenson has also worked on several film projects. In 2019, he was an executive producer for The Emoji Story, and in 2024, he was an executive producer on Sasquatch Sunset and The Apprentice. During financial and contractual issues facing The Apprentice, Benenson and executive producer James Shani partially helped buy out, fund, and release the film ahead of the 2024 general election in lieu of studios declining to distribute it due to the controversy of its content.

Currently, Benenson works at Twenty Two Ventures, a venture capital firm in San Francisco, as a General Partner. He also serves on the board of Rhizome.
