= Emoji =

Symbols for emotional cues in text

Each of the most popular emoji from the 9 major emoji categories according to the Unicode Emoji Frequency study from 2021, rendered in the Noto Color Emoji font

An emoji (/ɪˈmoʊdʒi/ i-MOH-jee or /iˈmoʊdʒi/ ee-MOH-jee; plural emoji or emojis; Japanese: 絵文字, pronounced [emoꜜ(d)ʑi]) is a pictogram, logogram, or ideogram embedded in text and used in electronic messages and web pages. The primary function of modern emoji is to fill in emotional cues otherwise missing from typed conversation as well as to replace words as part of a logographic system.

The first emoji sets were created by Japanese portable electronic device companies in the late 1980s and the 1990s. The word emoji comes from Japanese e (絵; 'picture') + moji (文字; 'character') and originally meant 'pictograph'; the resemblance to the English words emotion and emoticon is purely coincidental. Emoji became increasingly popular worldwide in the 2010s after Unicode began encoding emoji into the Unicode Standard. They are now considered to be a large part of popular culture in the West and around the world. In 2015, Oxford Dictionaries named the emoji U+1F602 😂 FACE WITH TEARS OF JOY its word of the year.

== History ==
=== Predecessors ===
The emoji was predated by the emoticon, a concept implemented in 1982 by computer scientist Scott Fahlman when he suggested text-based symbols such as :-) and :-( could be used to replace language. Theories about language replacement can be traced back to the 1960s, when Russian novelist and professor Vladimir Nabokov stated in an interview with The New York Times: "I often think there should exist a special typographical sign for a smile — some sort of concave mark, a supine round bracket." It did not become a mainstream concept until the 1990s, when Japanese, American, and European companies began developing Fahlman's idea. Mary Kalantzis and Bill Cope point out that similar symbology was incorporated by Bruce Parello, a student at the University of Illinois, into PLATO IV, the first e-learning system, in 1972. The PLATO system was not considered mainstream, and therefore Parello's pictograms were only used by a small number of people. Scott Fahlman's emoticons importantly used common alphabet symbols and aimed to replace language/text to express emotion, and for that reason are seen as the actual origin of emoticons.

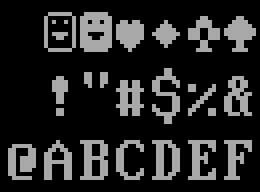
Smiley faces on the IBM PC

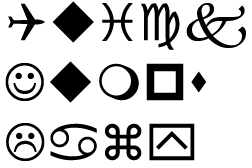
Wingdings icons, including smiling and frowning faces

The IBM PC included two simple smiling faces in its Code page 437 character set as early as 1981. Microsoft's Wingdings, released in 1990, could be used to send pictographs in rich text messages, but would only load on devices with the Wingdings font installed. In 1995, the French newspaper Le Monde announced that Alcatel would be launching a new phone, the BC 600. Its welcome screen displayed a digital smiley face, replacing the usual text seen as part of the "welcome message" often seen on other devices at the time.

=== Early emoji sets (1980s–1990s) ===
The first emoji sets – character sets or font families with an array of different modern emoji – are a matter of contention due to differing definitions and poor early documentation. It was previously widely considered that DoCoMo had the first emoji set in 1999, but an Emojipedia blog article in 2019 brought SoftBank's earlier 1997 set to light. More recently, in 2024, earlier emoji sets were uncovered on portable devices by Sharp Corporation and NEC in the early 1990s, with the 1988 Sharp PA-8500 harboring what can be defined as the earliest known emoji set that reflects emoji keyboards today. The earliest known use of 絵文字 (the Japanese word for emoji) appearing next to a recognisable set of emoji symbols is in the manual for the Toshiba JW 95F Rupo word processor from 1988, which also contains a seahorse emoji that has often been quoted as a Mandela effect since the introduction of emoji into Unicode.

SoftBank's 1997 set was launched by the company's J-Phone arm on the SkyWalker DP-211SW. The 90 emoji on this device were 12 by 12 pixels and monochrome, depicting numbers, sports, the time, moon phases, and the weather. It contained the Pile of Poo emoji in particular. The J-Phone model experienced low sales, and the emoji set was thus rarely used.

The more well-known DoCoMo emoji set was created by Shigetaka Kurita in 1999 for NTT DoCoMo's i-mode, used on its mobile platform. They were intended to help facilitate electronic communication and to serve as a distinguishing feature from other services. According to interviews, he took inspiration from iconographic conventions in Japanese manga, as well as Chinese characters and street sign and weather pictograms. The DoCoMo i-Mode set included facial expressions, such as smiley faces, derived from a Japanese visual style commonly found in manga and anime, combined with kaomoji and smiley elements. Kurita's work is displayed in the Museum of Modern Art in New York City.

Kurita's 176 emoji were brightly colored, albeit with a single color per grapheme. General-use emoji, such as sports, actions, and weather, can readily be traced back to Kurita's emoji set. The yellow-faced emoji in current use evolved from other emoticon sets and cannot be traced back to Kurita's work. Elsewhere in the 1990s, Nokia phones began including preset pictograms in its text messaging app, which they defined as "smileys and symbols". A third notable emoji set was introduced by Japanese mobile phone brand au by KDDI.

=== Growth of emoji sets (2000–2007) ===
The basic 12-by-12-pixel emoji in Japan grew in popularity across various platforms over the next decade. While emoji adoption was high in Japan during this time, the competitors failed to collaborate to create a uniform set of emoji to be used across all platforms in the country.

The Universal Coded Character Set (Unicode), controlled by the Unicode Consortium and ISO/IEC JTC 1/SC 2, had already been established as the international standard for text representation (ISO/IEC 10646) since 1993, although variants of Shift JIS remained relatively common in Japan. Unicode included several characters which would subsequently be classified as emoji, including some from North American or Western European sources such as DOS code page 437, ITC Zapf Dingbats, or the WordPerfect Iconic Symbols set. Unicode coverage of written characters was extended several times by new editions during the 2000s, with little interest in incorporating the Japanese cellular emoji sets (deemed out of scope), although symbol characters which would subsequently be classified as emoji continued to be added. For example, Unicode 4.0 contained 16 new emoji, which included direction arrows, a warning triangle, and an eject button. Besides Zapf Dingbats, other dingbat fonts such as Wingdings or Webdings also included additional pictographic symbols in their own custom pi font encodings; unlike Zapf Dingbats, however, many of these would not be available as Unicode emoji until 2014.

Nicolas Loufrani applied to the US Copyright Office in 1999 to register the 471 smileys that he created. Soon after he created The Smiley Dictionary, which not only hosted the largest number of smileys at the time, it also categorized them. The desktop platform was aimed at allowing people to insert smileys as text when sending emails and writing on a desktop computer. By 2003, it had grown to 887 smileys and 640 ascii emotions.

The smiley toolbar offered a variety of symbols and smileys and was used on platforms such as MSN Messenger. Nokia, then one of the largest global telecom companies, was still referring to today's emoji sets as smileys in 2001. The digital smiley movement was headed up by Nicolas Loufrani, the CEO of The Smiley Company. He created a smiley toolbar, which was available at smileydictionary.com during the early 2000s to be sent as emoji. Over the next two years, The Smiley Dictionary became the plug-in of choice for forums and online instant messaging platforms. There were competitors, but The Smiley Dictionary was the most popular. Platforms such as MSN Messenger allowed for customisation from 2001 onwards, with many users importing emoticons to use in messages as text. These emoticons would eventually go on to become the modern-day emoji. It was not until MSN Messenger and BlackBerry noticed the popularity of these unofficial sets and launched their own from late 2003 onwards.

=== Beginnings of Unicode emoji (2007–2014) ===
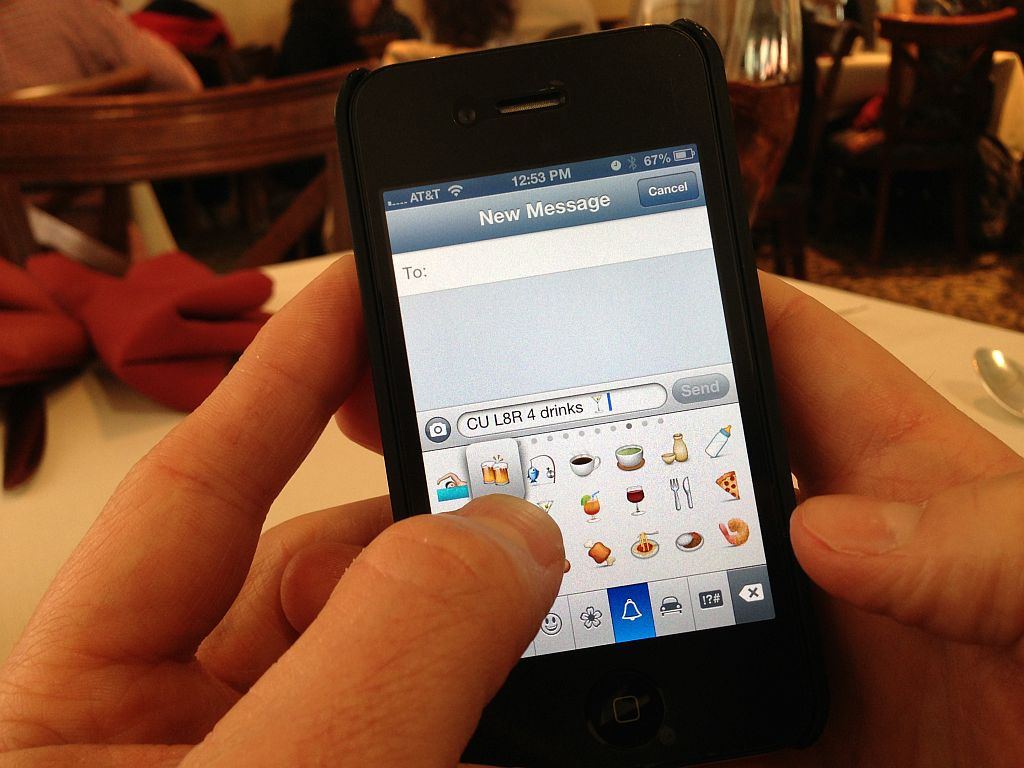
Emoji being added to a text message, 2013

An early use of the heart symbol as part of an English language sentence in the I Love New York advertising campaign of 1977

The first American company to take notice of emoji was Google beginning in 2007. In August 2007, a team made up of Mark Davis and his colleagues Kat Momoi and Markus Scherer began petitioning the Unicode Technical Committee (UTC) in an attempt to standardise the emoji. The UTC, having previously deemed emoji to be out of scope for Unicode, made the decision to broaden its scope to enable compatibility with the Japanese cellular carrier formats which were becoming more widespread. Peter Edberg and Yasuo Kida joined the collaborative effort from Apple Inc. shortly after, and their official UTC proposal came in January 2009 with 625 new emoji characters. Unicode accepted the proposal in 2010.

Pending the assignment of standard Unicode code points, Google and Apple implemented emoji support via Private Use Area schemes. Google first introduced emoji in Gmail in October 2008, in collaboration with au by KDDI, and Apple introduced the first release of Apple Color Emoji to iPhone OS on 21 November 2008. Initially, Apple's emoji support was implemented for holders of a SoftBank SIM card; the emoji themselves were represented using SoftBank's Private Use Area scheme and mostly resembled the SoftBank designs. Gmail emoji used their own Private Use Area scheme in a supplementary Private Use plane.

Separately, a proposal had been submitted in 2008 to add the ARIB extended characters used in broadcasting in Japan to Unicode. This included several pictographic symbols. These were added in Unicode 5.2 in 2009, a year before the cellular emoji sets were fully added; they include several characters which either also appeared amongst the cellular emoji or were subsequently classified as emoji.

After iPhone users in the United States discovered that downloading Japanese apps allowed access to the keyboard, pressure grew to expand the availability of the emoji keyboard beyond Japan. The Emoji application for iOS, which altered the Settings app to allow access to the emoji keyboard, was created by Josh Gare in February 2010. Before the existence of Gare's Emoji app, Apple had intended for the emoji keyboard to only be available in Japan in iOS version 2.2.

Throughout 2009, members of the Unicode Consortium and national standardization bodies of various countries gave feedback and proposed changes to the international standardization of the emoji. The feedback from various bodies in the United States, Europe, and Japan agreed on a set of 722 emoji as the standard set. This would be released in October 2010 in Unicode 6.0. Apple made the emoji keyboard available to those outside of Japan in iOS version 5.0 in 2011. Later, Unicode 7.0 (June 2014) added the character repertoires of the Webdings and Wingdings fonts to Unicode, resulting in approximately 250 more Unicode emoji.

The Unicode emoji whose code points were assigned in 2014 or earlier are therefore taken from several sources. A single character could exist in multiple sources, and characters from a source were unified with existing characters where appropriate: for example, the "shower" weather symbol (☔️) from the ARIB source was unified with an existing umbrella with raindrops character, which had been added for KPS 9566 compatibility. The emoji characters named "Rain" ("雨", ame) from all three Japanese carriers were in turn unified with the ARIB character. However, the Unicode Consortium groups the most significant sources of emoji into four categories:

Source category	Abbreviations	Unicode version (year)	Included sources	Example
Zapf Dingbats	ZDings, z	1.0 (1991)	ITC Zapf Dingbats Series 100	❣️ (U+2763 ← 0xA3)
ARIB	ARIB, a	5.2 (2008)	ARIB STD-B24 Volume 1 extended Shift JIS	⛩️ (U+26E9 ← 0xEE4B)
Japanese carriers	JCarrier, j	6.0 (2010)	NTT DoCoMo mobile Shift JIS	🎠 (U+1F3A0 ← 0xF8DA)
Japanese carriers	JCarrier, j	6.0 (2010)	au by KDDI mobile Shift JIS	📌 (U+1F4CC ← 0xF78A)
Japanese carriers	JCarrier, j	6.0 (2010)	SoftBank 3G mobile Shift JIS	💒 (U+1F492 ← 0xFB7D)
Wingdings and Webdings	WDings, w	7.0 (2014)	Webdings	🛳️ (U+1F6F3 ← 0x54)
Wingdings and Webdings	WDings, w	7.0 (2014)	Wingdings	🏵️ (U+1F3F5 ← 0x7B)
Wingdings and Webdings	WDings, w	7.0 (2014)	Wingdings 2	🖍️ (U+1F58D ← 0x24)
Wingdings and Webdings	WDings, w	7.0 (2014)	Wingdings 3	▶️ (U+25B6 ← 0x75) (Note: Also has ARIB (ARIB SJIS 0xEECE) and JCarrier (SoftBank SJIS 0xF7DA, au SJIS 0xF74A) sources.)

=== UTS #51 and modern emoji (2015–present) ===
Color emoji from Google's Noto Emoji Project, started in 2012 and used by Gmail, Google Hangouts, ChromeOS and Android

In late 2014, a Public Review Issue was created by the Unicode Technical Committee, seeking feedback on a proposed Unicode Technical Report (UTR) titled "Unicode Emoji". This was intended to improve interoperability of emoji between vendors, and define a means of supporting multiple skin tones. The feedback period closed in January 2015. Also in January 2015, the use of the zero-width joiner to indicate that a sequence of emoji could be shown as a single equivalent grapheme (analogous to a ligature) as a means of implementing emoji without atomic code points, such as varied compositions of families, was discussed within the "emoji ad-hoc committee".

Unicode 8.0 (June 2015) added another 41 emoji, including articles of sports equipment such as the cricket bat, food items such as the taco, new facial expressions, and symbols for places of worship, as well as five characters (crab, scorpion, lion face, bow and arrow, amphora) to improve support for pictorial rather than symbolic representations of the signs of the Zodiac. (Note: Older au by KDDI devices had used pictorial representations of all zodiac signs, displaying for instance the pisces sign (♓️) as a fish (🐟). Later devices had changed these to symbols, for consistency with other vendors.)

Also in June 2015, the first approved version ("Emoji 1.0") of the Unicode Emoji report was published as Unicode Technical Report #51 (UTR #51). This introduced the mechanism of skin tone indicators, the first official recommendations about which Unicode characters were to be considered emoji, and the first official recommendations about which characters were to be displayed in an emoji font in the absence of a variation selector, and listed the zero-width joiner sequences for families and couples that were implemented by existing vendors. Maintenance of UTR #51, taking emoji requests, and creating proposals for emoji characters and emoji mechanisms was made the responsibility of the Unicode Emoji Subcommittee (ESC), operating as a subcommittee of the Unicode Technical Committee.

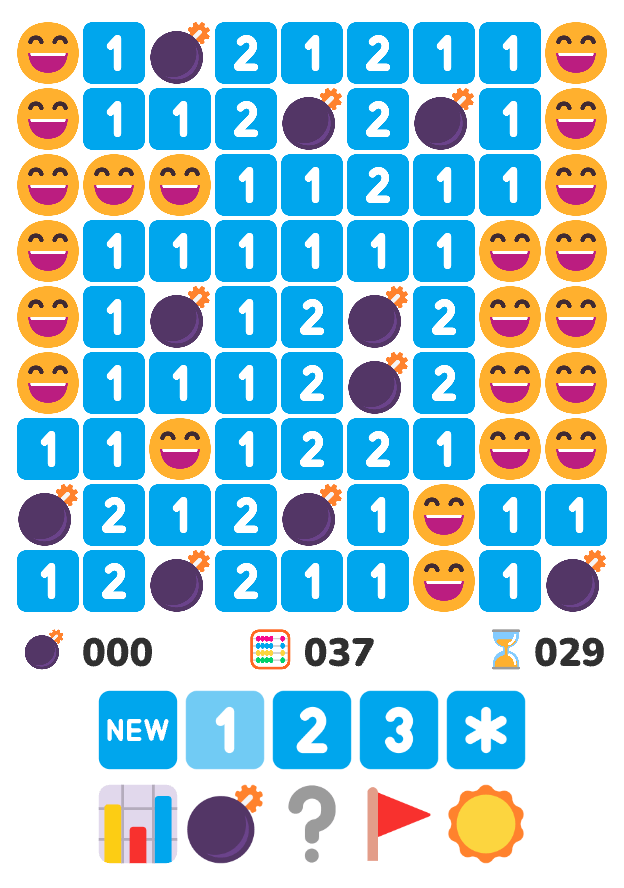
An online version of Minesweeper using emoji

With the release of version 5.0 in May 2017 alongside Unicode 10.0, UTR #51 was redesignated a Unicode Technical Standard (UTS #51), making it an independent specification. As of July 2017, there were 2,666 Unicode emoji listed. The next version of UTS #51 (published in May 2018) skipped to the version number Emoji 11.0 so as to synchronise its major version number with the corresponding version of the Unicode Standard. The popularity of emoji has caused pressure from vendors and international markets to add additional designs into the Unicode standard to meet the demands of different cultures. Some characters now defined as emoji are inherited from a variety of pre-Unicode messenger systems not only used in Japan, including Yahoo and MSN Messenger. Corporate demand for emoji standardization has placed pressures on the Unicode Consortium, with some members complaining that it had overtaken the group's traditional focus on standardizing characters used for minority languages and transcribing historical records. Conversely, the Consortium thought that public desire for emoji support has put pressure on vendors to improve their Unicode support, which is especially true for characters outside the Basic Multilingual Plane, thus leading to better support for Unicode's historic and minority scripts in deployed software.

In 2022, the Unicode Consortium decided to stop accepting proposals for flag emoji, citing low use of the category and that adding new flags "creates exclusivity at the expense of others". The Consortium stated that new flag emoji would still be added when their country becomes part of the ISO 3166-1 standard, with no proposal needed.

=== Cultural influence ===
Color illustrations of U+1F602 😂 FACE WITH TEARS OF JOY from Twemoji, Noto Emoji Project and Firefox OS

Oxford Dictionaries named U+1F602 😂 FACE WITH TEARS OF JOY its 2015 Word of the Year. Oxford noted that 2015 had seen a sizable increase in the use of the word "emoji" and recognized its impact on popular culture. Oxford Dictionaries President Caspar Grathwohl expressed that "traditional alphabet scripts have been struggling to meet the rapid-fire, visually focused demands of 21st Century communication. It's not surprising that a pictographic script like emoji has stepped in to fill those gaps — it's flexible, immediate, and infuses tone beautifully." SwiftKey found that "Face with Tears of Joy" was the most popular emoji across the world. The American Dialect Society declared U+1F346 🍆 AUBERGINE to be the "Most Notable Emoji" of 2015 in their Word of the Year vote. A 2015 report found U+1F4A9 💩 PILE OF POO was most popular in Canada among users of a proprietary keyboard application.

Some emoji are specific to Japanese culture, such as a bowing businessman (U+1F647 🙇 PERSON BOWING DEEPLY), the shoshinsha mark used to indicate a beginner driver (U+1F530 🔰 JAPANESE SYMBOL FOR BEGINNER), a white flower (U+1F4AE 💮 WHITE FLOWER) used to denote "brilliant homework", or a group of emoji representing popular foods: ramen noodles (U+1F35C 🍜 STEAMING BOWL), dango (U+1F361 🍡 DANGO), onigiri (U+1F359 🍙 RICE BALL), curry (U+1F35B 🍛 CURRY AND RICE), and sushi (U+1F363 🍣 SUSHI). Unicode Consortium founder Mark Davis compared the use of emoji to a developing language, particularly mentioning the American use of eggplant (U+1F346 🍆 AUBERGINE) to represent a phallus. Some linguists have classified emoji and emoticons as discourse markers.

A variety of emoji as they appear on Google's Noto Color Emoji set in 2024

In December 2015, a sentiment analysis of emoji was published, and the Emoji Sentiment Ranking 1.0 was provided. In 2016, a musical about emoji premiered in Los Angeles. The animated The Emoji Movie was released in summer 2017.

In January 2017, in what is believed to be the first large-scale study of emoji usage, researchers at the University of Michigan analyzed over 1.2 billion messages input via the Kika Emoji Keyboard and announced that U+1F602 😂 FACE WITH TEARS OF JOY was the most popular emoji. U+2764 ❤️ HEAVY BLACK HEART and U+1F60D 😍 SMILING FACE WITH HEART-SHAPED EYES stood second and third, respectively. The study also found that the French use heart emoji the most. People in countries like Australia, France, and the Czech Republic used more happy emoji, while this was not so for people in Mexico, Colombia, Chile, and Argentina, where people used more negative emoji in comparison to cultural hubs known for restraint and self-discipline, like Turkey, France, and Russia.

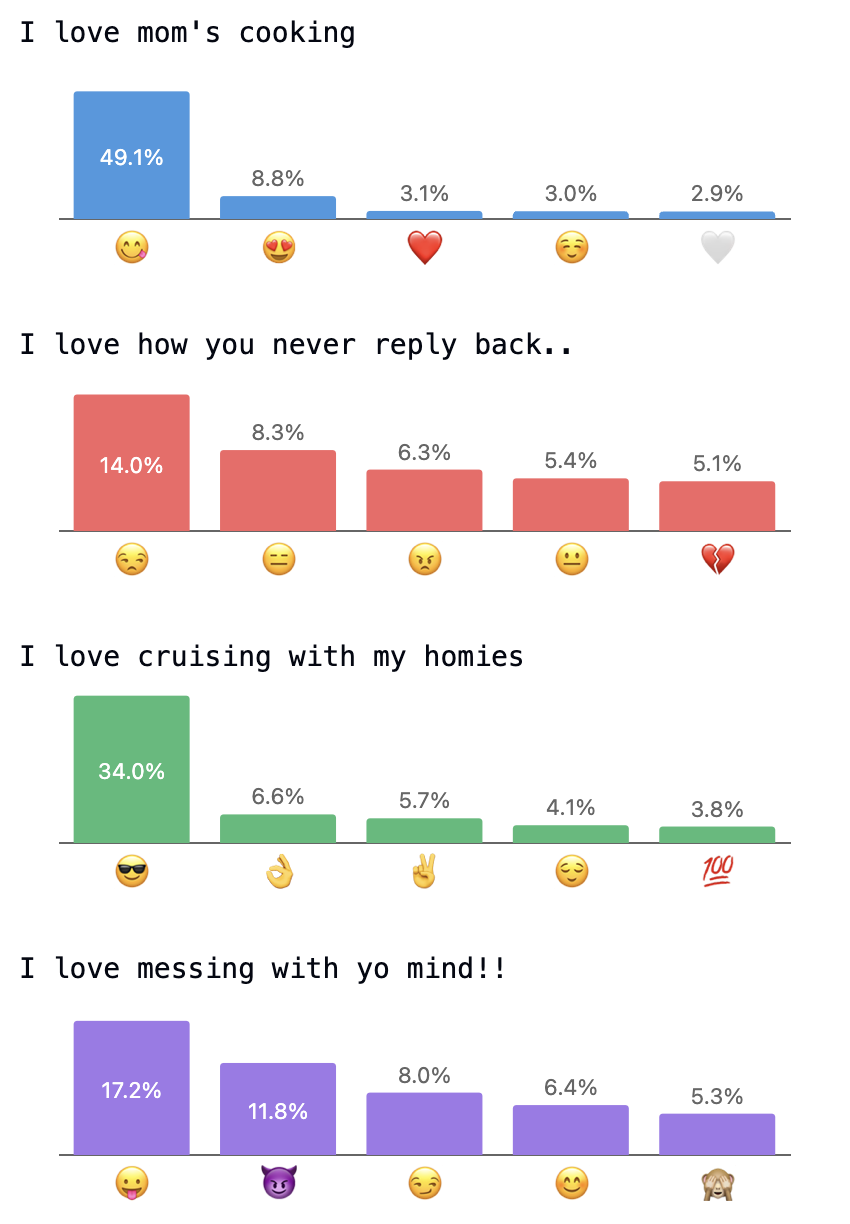
Sample emoji probability distributions generated by the DeepMoji model

There has been discussion among legal experts on whether or not emoji could be admissible as evidence in court trials. Furthermore, as emoji continue to develop and grow as a "language" of symbols, there may also be the potential of the formation of emoji "dialects". Emoji are being used as more than just to show reactions and emotions. Snapchat has even incorporated emoji in its trophy and friends system with each emoji showing a complex meaning. Emoji can also convey different meanings based on syntax and inversion. For instance, 'fairy comments' involve heart, star, and fairy emoji placed between the words of a sentence. These comments often invert the meanings associated with hearts and may be used to 'tread on borders of offense.'

In 2017, the MIT Media Lab published DeepMoji, a deep neural network sentiment analysis algorithm that was trained on 1.2 billion emoji occurrences in Twitter data from 2013 to 2017. DeepMoji was found to outperform human subjects in correctly identifying sarcasm in Tweets and other online modes of communication. In 2021, DeepMoji gained international attention when it was featured in the text-to-speech website 15.ai, which used its emoji embeddings to allow users to specify the emotion of AI-generated speech through guiding phrases.

==== Use in furthering causes ====
U+1FA78 🩸 DROP OF BLOOD on Twemoji

On March 5, 2019, a drop of blood (U+1FA78 🩸 DROP OF BLOOD) emoji was released, which is intended to help break the stigma of menstruation. In addition to normalizing periods, it will also be relevant to describe medical topics such as donating blood and other blood-related activities.

A mosquito (U+1F99F 🦟 MOSQUITO) emoji was added in 2018 to raise awareness for diseases spread by the insect, such as dengue and malaria.

U+1F99F 🦟 MOSQUITO from Microsoft's Fluent Emoji Project

== Linguistic function of emoji ==
Linguistically, emoji are used to indicate emotional state; they tend to be used more in positive communication. Some researchers believe emoji can be used for visual rhetoric. Emoji can be used to set emotional tone in messages. Emoji tend not to have their own meaning but act as a paralanguage, adding meaning to text. Emoji can add clarity and credibility to text.

Sociolinguistically, the use of emoji differs depending on speaker and setting. Women use emoji more than men. Men use a wider variety of emoji. Women are more likely to use emoji in public communication than in private communication. Extraversion and agreeableness are positively correlated with emoji use; neuroticism is negatively correlated. Emoji use differs between cultures: studies in terms of Hofstede's cultural dimensions theory found that cultures with high power distance and tolerance to indulgence used more negative emoji, while those with high uncertainty avoidance, individualism, and long-term orientation use more positive emoji. A 6-country user experience study showed that emoji-based scales (specifically the usage of smileys) may ease the challenges related to translation and implementation for brief cross-cultural surveys.

As emoji act as a paralanguage this causes a unique pattern to be seen in the bigrams, trigrams, and quadrigrams of emoji. A study conducted by Gretchen McCulloch and Lauren Gawne showed that the most common bigrams, trigrams, and quadrigrams of emoji are those that repeat the same emoji. Unlike other languages emoji frequently are repeated one after another, while in languages, such as English, it is rare to see words repeated after one another. An example of this is that a common bigram for emoji is two crying laughing emoji. Rather than being a repeated word or phrase the use of emoji after one another typically represents emphasis of the displayed emoji's meaning instead. So, one crying laughing emoji means something is funny, two represent it's really funny, three might represent it's incredibly funny, and so forth.

== Emoji communication problems ==
Research has shown that emoji are often misunderstood. In some cases, this misunderstanding is related to how the actual emoji design is interpreted by the viewer; in other cases, the emoji that was sent is not shown in the same way on the receiving side.

The first issue relates to the cultural or contextual interpretation of the emoji. When the author picks an emoji, they think about it in a certain way, but the same character may not trigger the same thoughts in the mind of the receiver. For example, people in China have developed a system for using emoji subversively so that a smiley face could be sent to convey a despising, mocking, and obnoxious attitude, as the orbicularis oculi (the muscle near that upper eye corner) on the face of the emoji does not move, and the orbicularis oris (the one near the mouth) tightens, which is believed to be a sign of suppressing a smile.

The second problem relates to encodings. When an author of a message picks an emoji from a list, it is normally encoded in a non-graphical manner during the transmission, and if the author and the reader do not use the same software or operating system for their devices, the reader's device may visualize the same emoji in a different way. As an example, in April 2020, British actress and presenter Jameela Jamil posted a tweet from her iPhone using U+1F92D 🤭 SMILING FACE WITH SMILING EYES AND HAND COVERING MOUTH as part of a comment on people shopping for food during the COVID-19 pandemic. On Apple's iOS, the emoji expression was neutral and pensive, but on other platforms the emoji shows as a giggling face. Some fans thought that she was mocking poor people, but this was not her intended meaning.

Researchers from the German Studies Institute at Ruhr-Universität Bochum found that most people can easily understand an emoji when it replaces a word directly – like an icon for a rose instead of the word 'rose' – yet it takes people about 50 percent longer to comprehend the emoji.

=== Variation and ambiguity ===
Emoji characters vary slightly between platforms within the limits in meaning defined by the Unicode specification, as companies have tried to provide artistic presentations of ideas and objects. For example, following an Apple tradition, the calendar emoji on Apple products always shows July 17, the date in 2002 Apple announced its iCal calendar application for macOS. This led some Apple product users to initially nickname July 17 "World Emoji Day". Other emoji fonts show different dates or do not show a specific one.

Some Apple emoji are very similar to the SoftBank standard, since SoftBank was the first Japanese network on which the iPhone launched. For example, U+1F483 💃 DANCER is female on Apple and SoftBank standards but male or gender-neutral on others.

Journalists have noted that the ambiguity of emoji has allowed them to take on culture-specific meanings not present in the original graphemes. For example, U+1F485 💅 NAIL POLISH has been described as being used in English-language communities to signify "non-caring fabulousness" and "anything from shutting haters down to a sense of accomplishment". Unicode manuals sometimes provide notes on auxiliary meanings of an object to guide designers on how emoji may be used, for example noting that some users may expect U+1F4BA 💺 SEAT to stand for "a reserved or ticketed seat, as for an airplane, train, or theater".

=== Controversial emoji ===
Evolution of the pistol emoji as rendered by stock Android systems. From left to right: Jelly Bean (pistol), KitKat (blunderbuss), Lollipop (revolver), Oreo (revolver) and Pie (water gun).

Some emoji have been involved in controversy due to their perceived meanings. Multiple arrests and imprisonments have followed the usage of pistol (U+1F52B 🔫 PISTOL), knife (U+1F5E1 🗡 DAGGER KNIFE), and bomb (U+1F4A3 💣 BOMB) emoji in ways that authorities deemed credible threats.

In the lead-up to the 2016 Summer Olympics, the Unicode Consortium considered proposals to add several Olympic-related emoji, including medals and events such as handball and water polo. By October 2015, these candidate emoji included "rifle" (U+1F946 🥆 RIFLE) and "modern pentathlon" (U+1F93B 🤻 MODERN PENTATHLON). However, in 2016, Apple and Microsoft opposed these two emoji, and the characters were added without emoji presentations, meaning that software is expected to render them in black-and-white rather than color, and emoji-specific software such as onscreen keyboards will generally not include them. In addition, while the original incarnations of the modern pentathlon emoji depicted its five events, including a man pointing a gun, the final grapheme contains a person riding a horse, along with a laser pistol target in the corner.

Original (left) and revised (right) Twitter designs, showing the transition from a revolver to a water pistol

On August 1, 2016, Apple announced that in iOS 10, the pistol emoji (U+1F52B 🔫 PISTOL) would be changed from a realistic revolver to a water pistol. Conversely, the following day, Microsoft pushed out an update to Windows 10 that changed its longstanding depiction of the pistol emoji as a toy raygun to a real revolver. Microsoft stated that the change was made to bring the glyph more in line with industry-standard designs and customer expectations. By 2018, most major platforms such as Google, Microsoft, Samsung, Facebook, and Twitter had transitioned their rendering of the pistol emoji to match Apple's water gun implementation. Apple's change of depiction from a realistic gun to a toy gun was criticised by, among others, the editor of Emojipedia, because it could lead to messages appearing differently to the receiver than the sender had intended. Insider's Rob Price said it created the potential for "serious miscommunication across different platforms", and asked, "What if a joke sent from an Apple user to a Google user is misconstrued because of differences in rendering? Or if a genuine threat sent by a Google user to an Apple user goes unreported because it is taken as a joke?"

The eggplant (aubergine) emoji (U+1F346 🍆 AUBERGINE) has also seen controversy due to it being used to represent a penis. Beginning in December 2014, the hashtag #EggplantFridays began to rise to popularity on Instagram for use in marking photos featuring clothed or unclothed penises. This became such a popular trend that, beginning in April 2015, Instagram disabled the ability to search for not only the #EggplantFridays tag, but also other eggplant-containing hashtags, including simply #eggplant and #🍆.

The peach emoji (U+1F351 🍑 PEACH) has likewise been used as a euphemistic icon for buttocks, with a 2016 Emojipedia analysis revealing that only seven percent of English language tweets with the peach emoji refer to the actual fruit. In 2016, Apple attempted to redesign the emoji to less resemble buttocks. This was met with fierce backlash in beta testing, and Apple reversed its decision by the time it went live to the public.

In December 2017, a lawyer in Delhi, India, threatened to file a lawsuit against WhatsApp for allowing use of the middle finger emoji (U+1F595 🖕 REVERSED HAND WITH MIDDLE FINGER EXTENDED) on the basis that the company is "directly abetting the use of an offensive, lewd, obscene gesture" in violation of the Indian Penal Code.

== Emoji implementation ==
=== Early implementation in Japan ===
Various, often incompatible, character encoding schemes were developed by the different mobile providers in Japan for their own emoji sets. For example, the extended Shift JIS representation F797 is used for a convenience store (🏪) by SoftBank, but for a wristwatch (⌚️) by KDDI. All three vendors also developed schemes for encoding their emoji in the Unicode Private Use Area: DoCoMo, for example, used the range U+E63E through U+E757. Versions of iOS prior to 5.1 encoded emoji in the SoftBank private use area.

=== Unicode support considerations ===
Most, but not all, emoji are included in the Supplementary Multilingual Plane (SMP) of Unicode, which is also used for ancient scripts, some modern scripts such as Adlam or Osage, and special-use characters such as Mathematical Alphanumeric Symbols. Some systems introduced prior to the advent of Unicode emoji were only designed to support characters in the Basic Multilingual Plane (BMP) on the assumption that non-BMP characters would rarely be encountered, although failure to properly handle characters outside of the BMP precludes Unicode compliance.

The introduction of Unicode emoji created an incentive for vendors to improve their support for non-BMP characters. The Unicode Consortium notes that "[b]ecause of the demand for emoji, many implementations have upgraded their Unicode support substantially", also helping support minority languages that use those features.

=== Color support ===
Any operating system that supports adding additional fonts to the system can add an emoji-supporting font. However, inclusion of colorful emoji in existing font formats requires dedicated support for color glyphs. Not all operating systems have support for color fonts, so emoji might be rendered as black-and-white line art or not at all. There are four different formats used for multi-color glyphs in an SFNT font, not all of which are necessarily supported by a given operating system library or software package such as a web browser or graphical program.

=== Implementation by different platforms and vendors ===
Apple first introduced emoji to their desktop operating system with the release of OS X 10.7 Lion, in 2011. Users can view emoji characters sent through email and messaging applications, which are commonly shared by mobile users, as well as any other application. Users can create emoji symbols using the "Characters" special input panel from almost any native application by selecting the "Edit" menu and pulling down to "Special Characters", or by the key combination ⌘ Command+⌥ Option+T. The emoji keyboard was first available in Japan with the release of iPhone OS version 2.2 in 2008. The emoji keyboard was not officially made available outside of Japan until iOS version 5.0. From iPhone OS 2.2 through to iOS 4.3.5 (2011), those outside Japan could access the keyboard but had to use a third-party app to enable it. Apple has revealed that the U+1F602 😂 FACE WITH TEARS OF JOY is the most popular emoji among English-speaking Americans. On second place is the red heart emoji, followed by U+1F62D 😭 LOUDLY CRYING FACE.

An update for Windows 7 and Windows Server 2008 R2 brought a subset of the monochrome Unicode set to those operating systems as part of the Segoe UI Symbol font. As of Windows 8 Preview, the Segoe UI Emoji font is included, which supplies full-color pictographs. The plain Segoe UI font lacks emoji characters, whereas Segoe UI Symbol and Segoe UI Emoji include them. Emoji characters can be accessed through the onscreen keyboard's 😀 key. The emoji panel shortcut ⊞ Win+. was added in Windows 10 version 1803.

In 2016, Firefox 50 added in-browser emoji rendering for platforms lacking in native support.

Facebook and Twitter replace all Unicode emoji used on their websites with their own custom graphics. Prior to October 2017, Facebook had different sets for the main site and for its Messenger service, where only the former provides complete coverage. Messenger now uses Apple emoji on iOS, and the main Facebook set elsewhere. Facebook reactions are only partially compatible with standard emoji.

== Modifiers ==
=== Emoji versus text presentation ===
Unicode defines variation sequences for many of its emoji to indicate their desired presentation.

Emoji characters can have two main kinds of presentation:

- an emoji presentation, with colorful and perhaps whimsical shapes, even animated
- a text presentation, such as black & white

— Unicode Technical Report #51: Unicode Emoji

Specifying the desired presentation is done by following the base emoji with either U+FE0E VARIATION SELECTOR-15 (VS15) for text or U+FE0F VARIATION SELECTOR-16 (VS16) for emoji-style. As of version 18.0 (2026), Unicode defines presentation sequences for 371 characters. However, the Unicode Technical Committee has since determined that unifying colourful emoji characters with textual symbols and dingbats was a "mistake", and resolved to allocate new code points rather than defining new presentation sequences.

Sample emoji variation sequences
U+	2139	231B	26A0	2712	2764	1F004	1F21A
Default presentation	Text	Emoji	Text	Text	Text	Emoji	Emoji
Base code point	ℹ	⌛	⚠	✒	❤	🀄	🈚
Base+VS15 (text)	ℹ︎	⌛︎	⚠︎	✒︎	❤︎	🀄︎	🈚︎
Base+VS16 (emoji)	ℹ️	⌛️	⚠️	✒️	❤️	🀄️	🈚️
Twemoji image							

=== Skin color ===
Five symbol modifier characters were added with Unicode 8.0 to provide a range of skin tones for human emoji. These modifiers are U+1F3FB–U+1F3FF. They are based on the Fitzpatrick scale for classifying human skin color. Human emoji that are not followed by one of these five modifiers should be displayed in a generic, non-realistic skin tone, such as bright yellow (■), blue (■), or gray (■). Human emoji that are followed directly by these characters should take on their skin color, as shown in the following table displaying skin tone variations of U+1F9D1 🧑 ADULT:

Sample use of Fitzpatrick modifiers
	Text	Image
Without modifier	🧑	
U+1F3FB 🏻 EMOJI MODIFIER FITZPATRICK TYPE-1-2	🧑🏻	
U+1F3FC 🏼 EMOJI MODIFIER FITZPATRICK TYPE-3	🧑🏼	
U+1F3FD 🏽 EMOJI MODIFIER FITZPATRICK TYPE-4	🧑🏽	
U+1F3FE 🏾 EMOJI MODIFIER FITZPATRICK TYPE-5	🧑🏾	
U+1F3FF 🏿 EMOJI MODIFIER FITZPATRICK TYPE-6	🧑🏿	

Non-human emoji (like U+26FD ⛽ FUEL PUMP) are unaffected by the Fitzpatrick modifiers. As of Unicode version 18.0, Fitzpatrick modifiers can be used with 135 human emoji spread across seven blocks: Dingbats, Emoticons, Miscellaneous Symbols, Miscellaneous Symbols and Pictographs, Supplemental Symbols and Pictographs, Symbols and Pictographs Extended-A, and Transport and Map Symbols.

=== Joining ===
Behaviour of the ZWJ and ZWNJ format controls with various types of character, including emoji

Implementations may use a zero-width joiner (ZWJ) between multiple emoji to make them behave like a single, unique emoji character. For example, the sequence U+1F468 👨 MAN, U+200D ZERO WIDTH JOINER, U+1F469 👩 WOMAN, U+200D ZERO WIDTH JOINER, U+1F467 👧 GIRL (👨‍👩‍👧) could be displayed as a single emoji depicting a family with a man, a woman, and a girl if the implementation supports it. Systems that do not support it would ignore the ZWJs, displaying only the three base emoji in order (👨👩👧).

Unicode previously maintained a catalog of emoji ZWJ sequences that were supported on at least one commonly available platform. The consortium has since switched to documenting sequences that are recommended for general interchange (RGI). These are clusters that emoji fonts are expected to include as part of the standard.

The ZWJ has also been used to implement platform-specific emoji. For example, in 2016, Microsoft released a series of Ninja Cat emoji for their Windows 10 Anniversary Update. The sequence U+1F431 🐱 CAT FACE, U+200D ZERO WIDTH JOINER, U+1F464 👤 BUST IN SILHOUETTE was used to create Ninja Cat (🐱‍👤). (Note: Five other Ninja Cat emoji were released: Stunt Cat (🐱‍🏍), Hacker Cat (🐱‍💻), Dino Cat (🐱‍🐉), Hipster Cat (🐱‍👓) and Astro Cat (🐱‍🚀).) Ninja Cat and variants were removed in late 2021's Fluent emoji redesign.

== In Unicode ==
Unicode 18.0 specifies a total of 3,972 emoji using 1,447 characters spread across 24 blocks, of which 26 are Regional indicator symbols that combine in pairs to form flag emoji, and 12 (#, * and 0–9) are base characters for keycap emoji sequences.

- 33 code points in the Dingbats block are considered emoji.
- All of the code points in the Emoticons block are considered emoji.
- 83 code points in the Miscellaneous Symbols block are considered emoji.
- 637 code points in the Miscellaneous Symbols and Pictographs block are considered emoji.
- 242 code points in the Supplemental Symbols and Pictographs block are considered emoji.
- All of the code points in the Symbols and Pictographs Extended-A block are considered emoji.
- 107 code points in the Transport and Map Symbols block are considered emoji.

Additional emoji can be found in the following Unicode blocks: Arrows (8 code points considered emoji), Basic Latin (12), CJK Symbols and Punctuation (2), Enclosed Alphanumeric Supplement (41), Enclosed Alphanumerics (1), Enclosed CJK Letters and Months (2), Enclosed Ideographic Supplement (15), General Punctuation (2), Geometric Shapes (8), Geometric Shapes Extended (13), Latin-1 Supplement (2), Letterlike Symbols (2), Mahjong Tiles (1), Miscellaneous Symbols and Arrows (7), Miscellaneous Technical (18), Playing Cards (1), and Supplemental Arrows-B (2).

== In popular culture ==
- The 2009 film Moon featured a robot named GERTY who communicates using a neutral-toned synthesized voice together with a screen showing emoji representing the corresponding emotional content.
- In 2014, the Library of Congress acquired an emoji version of Herman Melville's Moby Dick created by Fred Benenson.
- A musical called Emojiland premiered at Rockwell Table & Stage in Los Angeles in May 2016 after selected songs were presented at the same venue in 2015.
- In October 2016, the Museum of Modern Art acquired the original collection of emoji distributed by NTT DoCoMo in 1999.
- In November 2016, the first emoji-themed convention, Emojicon, was held in San Francisco.
- In March 2017, the first episode of the fifth season of Samurai Jack featured alien characters who communicate in emoji.
- In April 2017, the Doctor Who episode "Smile" featured nanobots called Vardy, which communicate through robotic avatars that use emoji (without any accompanying speech output) and are sometimes referred to by the time travelers as "Emojibots".
- On July 28, 2017, Sony Pictures Animation released The Emoji Movie, an animated movie featuring the voices of Patrick Stewart, Christina Aguilera, Sofía Vergara, Anna Faris, T. J. Miller, and other notable actors and comedians. It was universally panned, and it has been considered one of the worst animated films.
- On September 3, 2021, Drake released his sixth studio album, Certified Lover Boy. The album's cover art features twelve emoji of pregnant women in varying clothing colors, hair colors, and skin tones.

== See also ==
- Blissymbols – Ideographic writing system
- Blob emoji – Set of emoji by Google
- Emojipedia – Online encyclopedia devoted to emoji characters
- Emojli – 2014–2015 social media mobile application
- Egyptian hieroglyphs – Ancient Egyptian writing system
- iConji – Pictographic writing system
- Kaomoji – Emoticons using Japanese characters
- List of emojis
- Pictogram – Ideogram that conveys its meaning through its pictorial resemblance to a physical object
- Pirouette: Turning Points in Design – 2025 exhibition at the Museum of Modern Art
