= Symbols and Pictographs Extended-A =

- Range: U+1FA70..U+1FAFF (144 code points)
- Plane: SMP
- Scripts: Common
- Symbol sets: Emoji
- Assigned: 128 code points
- Unused: 16 reserved code points

Unicode Version History
- 12.0 (2019): 16 (+16)
- 13.0 (2020): 57 (+41)
- 14.0 (2021): 88 (+31)
- 15.0 (2022): 107 (+19)
- 16.0 (2024): 114 (+7)
- 17.0 (2025): 120 (+6)
- 18.0 (2026): 128 (+8)

Unicode documentation
- Code chart ∣ Web page

Symbols and Pictographs Extended-A is a Unicode block containing emoji characters. It extends the set of symbols included in the Supplemental Symbols and Pictographs block.

All of the characters in the Symbols and Pictographs Extended-A block are emoji.

== Chart ==
Symbols and Pictographs Extended-A^{[1]}^{[2]} Official Unicode Consortium code chart (PDF)
| | 0 | 1 | 2 | 3 | 4 | 5 | 6 | 7 | 8 | 9 | A | B | C | D | E | F |
| U+1FA7x | 🩰 | 🩱 | 🩲 | 🩳 | 🩴 | 🩵 | 🩶 | 🩷 | 🩸 | 🩹 | 🩺 | 🩻 | 🩼 | | | |
| U+1FA8x | 🪀 | 🪁 | 🪂 | 🪃 | 🪄 | 🪅 | 🪆 | 🪇 | 🪈 | 🪉 | 🪊 | 🪋 | 🪌 | 🪍 | 🪎 | 🪏 |
| U+1FA9x | 🪐 | 🪑 | 🪒 | 🪓 | 🪔 | 🪕 | 🪖 | 🪗 | 🪘 | 🪙 | 🪚 | 🪛 | 🪜 | 🪝 | 🪞 | 🪟 |
| U+1FAAx | 🪠 | 🪡 | 🪢 | 🪣 | 🪤 | 🪥 | 🪦 | 🪧 | 🪨 | 🪩 | 🪪 | 🪫 | 🪬 | 🪭 | 🪮 | 🪯 |
| U+1FABx | 🪰 | 🪱 | 🪲 | 🪳 | 🪴 | 🪵 | 🪶 | 🪷 | 🪸 | 🪹 | 🪺 | 🪻 | 🪼 | 🪽 | 🪾 | 🪿 |
| U+1FACx | 🫀 | 🫁 | 🫂 | 🫃 | 🫄 | 🫅 | 🫆 | | 🫈 | | | | 🫌 | 🫍 | 🫎 | 🫏 |
| U+1FADx | 🫐 | 🫑 | 🫒 | 🫓 | 🫔 | 🫕 | 🫖 | 🫗 | 🫘 | 🫙 | 🫚 | 🫛 | 🫜 | 🫝 | | 🫟 |
| U+1FAEx | 🫠 | 🫡 | 🫢 | 🫣 | 🫤 | 🫥 | 🫦 | 🫧 | 🫨 | 🫩 | 🫪 | 🫫 | | | | 🫯 |
| U+1FAFx | 🫰 | 🫱 | 🫲 | 🫳 | 🫴 | 🫵 | 🫶 | 🫷 | 🫸 | 🫹 | 🫺 | | | | | |
Notes 1.As of Unicode version 18.0 2.Grey areas indicate non-assigned code points

== Emoji modifiers ==
The Symbols and Pictographs Extended-A block has fourteen emoji that represent people or body parts. They can be modified using U+1F3FB–U+1F3FF to provide for a range of skin tones using the Fitzpatrick scale:

Human emoji
| U+ | 1FAC3 | 1FAC4 | 1FAC5 | 1FAF0 | 1FAF1 | 1FAF2 | 1FAF3 |
| emoji | 🫃 | 🫄 | 🫅 | 🫰 | 🫱 | 🫲 | 🫳 |
| FITZ-1-2 | 🫃🏻 | 🫄🏻 | 🫅🏻 | 🫰🏻 | 🫱🏻 | 🫲🏻 | 🫳🏻 |
| FITZ-3 | 🫃🏼 | 🫄🏼 | 🫅🏼 | 🫰🏼 | 🫱🏼 | 🫲🏼 | 🫳🏼 |
| FITZ-4 | 🫃🏽 | 🫄🏽 | 🫅🏽 | 🫰🏽 | 🫱🏽 | 🫲🏽 | 🫳🏽 |
| FITZ-5 | 🫃🏾 | 🫄🏾 | 🫅🏾 | 🫰🏾 | 🫱🏾 | 🫲🏾 | 🫳🏾 |
| FITZ-6 | 🫃🏿 | 🫄🏿 | 🫅🏿 | 🫰🏿 | 🫱🏿 | 🫲🏿 | 🫳🏿 |
| U+ | 1FAF4 | 1FAF5 | 1FAF6 | 1FAF7 | 1FAF8 | 1FAF9 | 1FAFA |
| emoji | 🫴 | 🫵 | 🫶 | 🫷 | 🫸 | 🫹 | 🫺 |
| FITZ-1-2 | 🫴🏻 | 🫵🏻 | 🫶🏻 | 🫷🏻 | 🫸🏻 | 🫹🏻 | 🫺🏻 |
| FITZ-3 | 🫴🏼 | 🫵🏼 | 🫶🏼 | 🫷🏼 | 🫸🏼 | 🫹🏼 | 🫺🏼 |
| FITZ-4 | 🫴🏽 | 🫵🏽 | 🫶🏽 | 🫷🏽 | 🫸🏽 | 🫹🏽 | 🫺🏽 |
| FITZ-5 | 🫴🏾 | 🫵🏾 | 🫶🏾 | 🫷🏾 | 🫸🏾 | 🫹🏾 | 🫺🏾 |
| FITZ-6 | 🫴🏿 | 🫵🏿 | 🫶🏿 | 🫷🏿 | 🫸🏿 | 🫹🏿 | 🫺🏿 |

Additional human emoji can be found in other Unicode blocks: Dingbats, Emoticons, Miscellaneous Symbols, Miscellaneous Symbols and Pictographs, Supplemental Symbols and Pictographs and Transport and Map Symbols.

== History ==
The following Unicode-related documents record the purpose and process of defining specific characters in the Symbols and Pictographs Extended-A block:

| Version | Final code points (Note: Proposed code points and characters names may differ from final code points and names) | Count | L2 ID | WG2 ID | Document |
|---|---|---|---|---|---|
| 12.0 | U+1FA70 | 1 | L2/18-113 | | Landmann, Ruediger (2018-03-31), Proposal to add new emoji to represent ballet |
| 12.0 | U+1FA70 | 1 | L2/18-143R2 | N4960 | Davis, Mark; et al. (2018-05-03), ESC Recommendations 2018Q2 (revised) |
| 12.0 | U+1FA70 | 1 | L2/18-115 | | Moore, Lisa (2018-05-09), "Consensus 155-C16 and 155-C18", UTC #155 Minutes |
| 12.0 | U+1FA70 | 1 | L2/18-234 | N5008 | Everson, Michael (2018-07-18), Feedback on draft candidates for Emoji 12.0 (L2/18-143R2) |
| 12.0 | U+1FA70 | 1 | L2/18-253 | | Davis, Mark (2018-08-21), Comments on accumulated feedback on Unicode 12.0 draft candidates |
| 12.0 | U+1FA70 | 1 | | N5020 (pdf, doc) | Umamaheswaran, V. S. (2019-01-11), "10.3.13", Unconfirmed minutes of WG 2 meeting 67 |
| 12.0 | U+1FA70 | 1 | L2/24-226R | | Daniel, Jennifer (2024-11-06), "2", Emoji Standard & Research Working Group Report for UTC #181 (2024Q4) |
| 12.0 | U+1FA70 | 1 | L2/24-221 | | Constable, Peter (2024-11-12), "Consensus 181-C7", UTC #181 Minutes, "Accept [...] 6 new RGI emoji ZWJ sequences" |
| 12.0 | U+1FA71 (Note: See also L2/18-234, L2/18-143R2, L2/18-115 (Consensus 155-C16 and 155-C18), and N5020 (10.3.13)) | 1 | L2/18-166 | | Lee, Jennifer 8.; Hutchinson, Florie (2018-04-26), Proposal for One Piece Swimsuit Emoji |
| 12.0 | U+1FA71 | 1 | L2/18-219 | | West, Andrew (2018-07-11), Feedback on ESC recommendations for draft candidates for Emoji 12.0 (L2/18143R2) |
| 12.0 | U+1FA71 | 1 | L2/18-246 | | Silva, Eduardo Marín (2018-07-20), Response to Andrew West on feedback on emoji submissions (L2/18-219) |
| 12.0 | U+1FA71 | 1 | L2/18-253 | | Davis, Mark (2018-08-21), Comments on accumulated feedback on Unicode 12.0 draft candidates |
| 12.0 | U+1FA72..1FA73 | 2 | L2/18-167 | | Blanchat, Kelly Marie; Knell, Dwight; Lee, Jennifer 8. (2018-03-01), Proposal for Briefs and Shorts Emoji |
| 12.0 | U+1FA72..1FA73 | 2 | L2/18-253 | | Davis, Mark (2018-08-21), Comments on accumulated feedback on Unicode 12.0 draft candidates |
| 12.0 | U+1FA78 | 1 | L2/18-092 | | Thermidor, Melissa; Mason, Francis (2018-04-03), Blood Drop Emoji Proposal |
| 12.0 | U+1FA78 | 1 | L2/18-253 | | Davis, Mark (2018-08-21), Comments on accumulated feedback on Unicode 12.0 draft candidates |
| 12.0 | U+1FA78 | 1 | L2/18-183 | | Moore, Lisa (2018-11-20), "Consensus 156-C5 Change names of three characters", UTC #156 Minutes |
| 12.0 | U+1FA79 | 1 | L2/18-146 | | Thermidor, Melissa (2018-04-27), Adhesive Bandage Emoji Proposal |
| 12.0 | U+1FA7A (Note: See also L2/18-219, L2/18-246, L2/18-234, L2/18-143R2, L2/18-115 (Consensus 155-C16 and 155-C18), and N5020 (10.3.13)) | 1 | L2/18-140 | | Thermidor, Melissa; Lee, Jennifer 8. (2018-03-29), Stethoscope Emoji Proposal |
| 12.0 | U+1FA7A | 1 | L2/18-253 | | Davis, Mark (2018-08-21), Comments on accumulated feedback on Unicode 12.0 draft candidates |
| 12.0 | U+1FA80 | 1 | L2/18-129 | | Pop, Doc; Marx, Alex D.; Lee, Jennifer 8. (2018-03-06), Yo Yo Emoji Proposal |
| 12.0 | U+1FA80 | 1 | L2/18-253 | | Davis, Mark (2018-08-21), Comments on accumulated feedback on Unicode 12.0 draft candidates |
| 12.0 | U+1FA80 | 1 | L2/18-183 | | Moore, Lisa (2018-11-20), "Consensus 156-C5 Change names of three characters", UTC #156 Minutes |
| 12.0 | U+1FA81 | 1 | L2/18-135 | | Johnston, Adam (2017-10-17), Kite Emoji Submission |
| 12.0 | U+1FA82 | 1 | L2/18-003 | | Holmes, Sam (2017-12-06), Proposal for Parachute Emoji |
| 12.0 | U+1FA82 | 1 | L2/18-253 | | Davis, Mark (2018-08-21), Comments on accumulated feedback on Unicode 12.0 draft candidates |
| 12.0 | U+1FA90 | 1 | L2/18-127 | | Swetz, Zachary; et al. (2018-04-05), Ringed Planet Emoji |
| 12.0 | U+1FA90 | 1 | L2/18-253 | | Davis, Mark (2018-08-21), Comments on accumulated feedback on Unicode 12.0 draft candidates |
| 12.0 | U+1FA91 | 1 | L2/18-091 | | Lee, Jennifer 8.; Marx, Alex D. (2018-03-01), Emoji Proposal for SITTING PERSON, STANDING PERSON and KNEELING PERSON |
| 12.0 | U+1FA91 | 1 | L2/18-253 | | Davis, Mark (2018-08-21), Comments on accumulated feedback on Unicode 12.0 draft candidates |
| 12.0 | U+1FA92 | 1 | L2/17-431 | | Parker, Christopher J. (2017-12-19), Razor Emoji Proposal |
| 12.0 | U+1FA92 | 1 | L2/18-253 | | Davis, Mark (2018-08-21), Comments on accumulated feedback on Unicode 12.0 draft candidates |
| 12.0 | U+1FA93 | 1 | L2/18-002 | | Gamm, Brandon (2017-11-20), Axe Emoji Submission |
| 12.0 | U+1FA93 | 1 | L2/18-253 | | Davis, Mark (2018-08-21), Comments on accumulated feedback on Unicode 12.0 draft candidates |
| 12.0 | U+1FA94 | 1 | L2/17-356 | | Pandey, Anshuman (2017-07-25), Proposal to encode the DIYA emoji |
| 12.0 | U+1FA94 | 1 | L2/18-033 | | Sharma, Shriramana (2018-01-16), Feedback on L2/17-356 Proposal for DIYA Emoji |
| 12.0 | U+1FA94 | 1 | L2/18-029 | | A, Srinidhi; A, Sridatta (2018-01-17), Feedback on the name of DIYA EMOJI |
| 12.0 | U+1FA94 | 1 | L2/18-007 | | Moore, Lisa (2018-03-19), "E.1.3.1.1", UTC #154 Minutes |
| 12.0 | U+1FA94 | 1 | L2/18-115 | | Moore, Lisa (2018-05-09), "Consensus 154-C22", UTC #155 Minutes, "Advance DIYA LAMP to provisional emoji candidate, based on L2/17-356." |
| 12.0 | U+1FA95 | 1 | L2/18-124 | | Wu, Sheng (2018-03-31), Proposal for BANJO Emoji |
| 12.0 | U+1FA95 | 1 | L2/18-253 | | Davis, Mark (2018-08-21), Comments on accumulated feedback on Unicode 12.0 draft candidates |
| 13.0 | U+1FA74 | 1 | L2/19-104 | | Ponton, Callum; Lee, Jennifer 8. (2019-03-03), Proposal for Emoji: FLIP-FLOP, STRAP SANDAL |
| 13.0 | U+1FA74 | 1 | L2/19-190R (pdf, aux) | N5056 | Davis, Mark (2019-04-30), Emoji Recommendations 2019Q2 (revised) |
| 13.0 | U+1FA74 | 1 | L2/19-122 | | Moore, Lisa (2019-05-08), "Consensus 159-C12", UTC #159 Minutes |
| 13.0 | U+1FA83 | 1 | L2/18-331R (Note: See also L2/19-190R, L2/19-122 (Consensus 159-C12)) | | Ponton, Callum; et al. (2019-03-03), Boomerang Emoji Proposal |
| 13.0 | U+1FA84 | 1 | L2/18-218 | | Hara, Chasen Le (2018-07-08), Magic Wand Emoji Proposal |
| 13.0 | U+1FA85 | 1 | L2/19-062 | | Blaesing, Rebecca; Te, Kimberly; Thermidor, Melissa; Gomez-Mont, Gabriella; Knell, Dwight; Lee, Jennifer 8. (2018-12-23), Piñata Emoji Proposal |
| 13.0 | U+1FA86 | 1 | L2/19-096 | | Gray, Jef; Sunne, Samantha (February 2019), Proposal for MATRYOSHKA Emoji |
| 13.0 | U+1FA86 | 1 | L2/19-273 | | Moore, Lisa (2019-06-19), Emoji Comments |
| 13.0 | U+1FA86 | 1 | L2/19-279 | | Lunde, Ken (2019-07-19), "3", ESC Response to WG2 Comments on Draft Emoji Candidates (L2/19-273) |
| 13.0 | U+1FA96 | 1 | L2/18-199 | | Voracek, Jace (2018-05-23), Proposal for Camouflage Helmet Emoji |
| 13.0 | U+1FA97 | 1 | L2/19-087 | | Triggs, Bruce (2019-02-18), Proposal for Emoji: ACCORDION |
| 13.0 | U+1FA98 | 1 | L2/19-090 | | Sunne, Samantha (February 2019), Proposal for Emoji: LONG DRUM |
| 13.0 | U+1FA99 | 1 | L2/17-229 | | McLaughlin, Katie (2016-06-27), Proposal for COIN emoji |
| 13.0 | U+1FA99 | 1 | L2/17-224 | | McGowan, Rick (2017-07-25), "L2/17-229 Coin emoji", Comments on Public Review Issues (May 01 - July 25, 2017) |
| 13.0 | U+1FA99 | 1 | L2/18-310 | | McCarthy, David; Lee, Jennifer 8. (2018-09-25), Coin Emoji Proposal |
| 13.0 | U+1FA99 | 1 | L2/19-273 | | Moore, Lisa (2019-06-19), Emoji Comments |
| 13.0 | U+1FA99 | 1 | L2/19-279 | | Lunde, Ken (2019-07-19), "3", ESC Response to WG2 Comments on Draft Emoji Candidates (L2/19-273) |
| 13.0 | U+1FA9A | 1 | L2/18-178 | | Marx, Alex D.; Knell, Dwight; Lee, Jennifer 8. (February 2018), Saw Emoji Proposal |
| 13.0 | U+1FA9A | 1 | L2/19-273 | | Moore, Lisa (2019-06-19), Emoji Comments |
| 13.0 | U+1FA9A | 1 | L2/19-279 | | Lunde, Ken (2019-07-19), "3", ESC Response to WG2 Comments on Draft Emoji Candidates (L2/19-273) |
| 13.0 | U+1FA9B | 1 | L2/18-179 | | Gluckman, David F.; Knell, Dwight; Lee, Jennifer 8. (2018-04-25), Proposal for Screwdriver Emoji |
| 13.0 | U+1FA9B | 1 | L2/19-273 | | Moore, Lisa (2019-06-19), Emoji Comments |
| 13.0 | U+1FA9B | 1 | L2/19-279 | | Lunde, Ken (2019-07-19), "3", ESC Response to WG2 Comments on Draft Emoji Candidates (L2/19-273) |
| 13.0 | U+1FA9C | 1 | L2/18-320 | | Blanchat, Kelly Marie (2018-10-23), Proposal for LADDER Emoji |
| 13.0 | U+1FA9C | 1 | L2/19-273 | | Moore, Lisa (2019-06-19), Emoji Comments |
| 13.0 | U+1FA9C | 1 | L2/19-279 | | Lunde, Ken (2019-07-19), "3", ESC Response to WG2 Comments on Draft Emoji Candidates (L2/19-273) |
| 13.0 | U+1FA9D | 1 | L2/18-327 | | Hooker, Charles (2018-05-09), Hook Emoji Submission |
| 13.0 | U+1FA9E | 1 | L2/19-098 | | Schear, Theo; Avedon, LaTurbo; Lee, Jennifer 8. (2019-02-21), Proposal for MIRROR Emoji |
| 13.0 | U+1FA9F | 1 | L2/19-108 | | Sunne, Samantha (February 2019), Proposal for Emoji: WINDOW |
| 13.0 | U+1FAA0 | 1 | L2/19-158 | | Krenek, Christian (2019-03-31), Proposal for Emoji: PLUNGER |
| 13.0 | U+1FAA1 | 1 | L2/19-088 | | Hickman, Amanda; Romo, Amberley; Gray, Mari (February 2019), Proposal for Emoji: SEWING NEEDLE |
| 13.0 | U+1FAA2 | 1 | L2/19-152 | | Sunne, Samantha (March 2019), Proposal for Emoji: KNOT |
| 13.0 | U+1FAA3 | 1 | L2/19-105 | | Adan, Malik; Schear, Theo; Lee, Jennifer 8. (2019-03-04), Bucket Pail Emoji Proposal |
| 13.0 | U+1FAA4 | 1 | L2/19-144 | | Wang, Shirley (2019-03-11), Proposal for Emoji: MOUSE TRAP |
| 13.0 | U+1FAA5 | 1 | L2/19-153R | | Ponton, Callum; Knell, Maya; Lee, Jennifer 8.; Sunne, Samantha (2019-10-04), Proposal for Emoji: TOOTHBRUSH |
| 13.0 | U+1FAA6 | 1 | L2/17-387 | | Kimura-Thollander, Philippe (2017-08-06), Proposal to Add Grave and Incense Characters |
| 13.0 | U+1FAA6 | 1 | L2/18-266 | | Kimura-Thollander, Philippe (2017-08-06), Proposal to Add Grave Emoji |
| 13.0 | U+1FAA6 | 1 | L2/18-307 | | "Provisional Candidate Proposals", ESC Recommendations for 2018Q4 UTC, 2018-09-18 |
| 13.0 | U+1FAA6 | 1 | L2/18-272 | | Moore, Lisa (2018-10-29), "Consensus 157-C11", UTC #157 Minutes |
| 13.0 | U+1FAA7 | 1 | L2/19-061 | | Schear, Theo; Lee, Jennifer 8. (2019-02-19), Proposal for PLACARD Emoji |
| 13.0 | U+1FAA8 | 1 | L2/19-145 | | Krenek, Christian (2019-03-31), Proposal for Emoji: ROCK |
| 13.0 | U+1FAB0 | 1 | L2/18-317 | | Dang, Athena; Bai, Justin (2018-08-09), Proposal for FLY Emoji |
| 13.0 | U+1FAB1 | 1 | L2/18-343 | | Thermidor, Melissa (2018-12-18), Worm Emoji Proposal |
| 13.0 | U+1FAB1 | 1 | L2/19-273 | | Moore, Lisa (2019-06-19), Emoji Comments |
| 13.0 | U+1FAB1 | 1 | L2/19-279 | | Lunde, Ken (2019-07-19), "3", ESC Response to WG2 Comments on Draft Emoji Candidates (L2/19-273) |
| 13.0 | U+1FAB2 | 1 | L2/19-148 | | Ward, Aaron (March 2019), Proposal for Emoji Beetle |
| 13.0 | U+1FAB3 | 1 | L2/19-095 | | Li, Jason; Thermidor, Melissa; Hickman, Amanda (2019-02-20), Proposal for Emoji: COCKROACH |
| 13.0 | U+1FAB4 | 1 | L2/18-261 | | Discepolo, Bonnie; Munson, Trevor; Knell, Dwight; Lee, Jennifer 8. (2018-07-31), Emoji Proposal: POTTED PLANT |
| 13.0 | U+1FAB4 | 1 | L2/19-273 | | Moore, Lisa (2019-06-19), Emoji Comments |
| 13.0 | U+1FAB4 | 1 | L2/19-279 | | Lunde, Ken (2019-07-19), "4", ESC Response to WG2 Comments on Draft Emoji Candidates (L2/19-273) |
| 13.0 | U+1FAB5 | 1 | L2/19-097 | | Sherry, Dylan; Knell, Dwight; Hickman, Amanda; Devasia, Ankita; Lee, Jennifer 8. (February 2019), Proposal for Emoji: WOOD |
| 13.0 | U+1FAB5 | 1 | L2/19-273 | | Moore, Lisa (2019-06-19), Emoji Comments |
| 13.0 | U+1FAB5 | 1 | L2/19-279 | | Lunde, Ken (2019-07-19), "3", ESC Response to WG2 Comments on Draft Emoji Candidates (L2/19-273) |
| 13.0 | U+1FAB6 | 1 | L2/18-200 | | Roy, Poulomi; Dugar, Sumesh; Dugar, Suhita (2018-04-12), Feather Emoji Submission |
| 13.0 | U+1FAC0 | 1 | L2/19-150 | | Kamkoff, Christian; He, Shuhan (2019-03-30), Proposal for Emoji: HEART (ORGAN) |
| 13.0 | U+1FAC0 | 1 | L2/19-273 | | Moore, Lisa (2019-06-19), Emoji Comments |
| 13.0 | U+1FAC0 | 1 | L2/19-279 | | Lunde, Ken (2019-07-19), "1", ESC Response to WG2 Comments on Draft Emoji Candidates (L2/19-273) |
| 13.0 | U+1FAC0 | 1 | L2/19-270 | | Moore, Lisa (2019-10-07), "E.1.4.1", UTC #160 Minutes |
| 13.0 | U+1FAC1 | 1 | L2/19-149 | | Kamkoff, Christian; He, Shuhan (2019-03-30), Proposal for Emoji: LUNG |
| 13.0 | U+1FAC2 | 1 | L2/19-109 | | Daniel, Jennifer (March 2019), Two People Hugging Emoji |
| 13.0 | U+1FAC2 | 1 | L2/19-273 | | Moore, Lisa (2019-06-19), Emoji Comments |
| 13.0 | U+1FAC2 | 1 | L2/19-279 | | Lunde, Ken (2019-07-19), "7", ESC Response to WG2 Comments on Draft Emoji Candidates (L2/19-273) |
| 13.0 | U+1FAD0 | 1 | L2/19-157 | | Devasia, Ankita; Krenek, Christian (2019-03-31), Proposal for Emoji: BLUEBERRIES |
| 13.0 | U+1FAD1 | 1 | L2/18-277 | | Pilypas, Heidi Helen (2018-07-17), Proposal for Capsicum Emoji |
| 13.0 | U+1FAD1 | 1 | L2/18-307 | | "Provisional Candidate Proposals", ESC Recommendations for 2018Q4 UTC, 2018-09-18 |
| 13.0 | U+1FAD1 | 1 | L2/18-272 | | Moore, Lisa (2018-10-29), "Consensus 157-C11", UTC #157 Minutes |
| 13.0 | U+1FAD2 | 1 | L2/19-146 | | Wakim, Ziad; Delmont, Sebastian (2019-03-31), Proposal for emoji: OLIVE |
| 13.0 | U+1FAD3 | 1 | L2/19-156 | | Delmont, Sebastian; Bigott, Lumen (2019-03-29), Proposal for Emoji: LATIN CORNBREAD |
| 13.0 | U+1FAD3 | 1 | L2/19-273 | | Moore, Lisa (2019-06-19), Emoji Comments |
| 13.0 | U+1FAD3 | 1 | L2/19-279 | | Lunde, Ken (2019-07-19), "5", ESC Response to WG2 Comments on Draft Emoji Candidates (L2/19-273) |
| 13.0 | U+1FAD4 | 1 | L2/19-154 | | Hara, Chasen Le (2019-04-08), Proposal for Emoji: TAMALE |
| 13.0 | U+1FAD4 | 1 | L2/19-273 | | Moore, Lisa (2019-06-19), Emoji Comments |
| 13.0 | U+1FAD4 | 1 | L2/19-279 | | Lunde, Ken (2019-07-19), "3", ESC Response to WG2 Comments on Draft Emoji Candidates (L2/19-273) |
| 13.0 | U+1FAD5 | 1 | L2/18-328 | | Bolzern, Tobias; Wehrle, Stefan (2018-11-14), Proposal for New Emoji: Fondue |
| 13.0 | U+1FAD6 | 1 | L2/19-103 | | Jacobi, Ian; Jacobi, Phillip (2019-03-02), Proposal for Emoji: TEAPOT |
| 13.0 | U+1FAD6 | 1 | L2/19-273 | | Moore, Lisa (2019-06-19), Emoji Comments |
| 13.0 | U+1FAD6 | 1 | L2/19-279 | | Lunde, Ken (2019-07-19), "2", ESC Response to WG2 Comments on Draft Emoji Candidates (L2/19-273) |
| 14.0 | U+1FA7B | 1 | L2/20-214 | | Ozkiral, Alijan; Krenek, Christian (2020-03-23), Proposal for X-Ray Emoji |
| 14.0 | U+1FA7B | 1 | L2/20-237 | | Moore, Lisa (2020-10-27), "Consensus 165-C23", UTC #165 Minutes |
| 14.0 | U+1FA7B | 1 | L2/20-242R2 | | Daniel, Jennifer (2020-10-07), Recommendations for Emoji, Unicode 14.0 |
| 14.0 | U+1FA7C | 1 | L2/19-379 (Note: See also L2/20-242R2, L2/20-237 (Consensus 165-C23)) | | Scheifl, Christian; et al. (October 2019), Proposal for Emoji: CRUTCH |
| 14.0 | U+1FAA9 | 1 | L2/19-310 | | Simone, Gero; Schear, Theo (2019-08-23), Mirror Ball Emoji Proposal |
| 14.0 | U+1FAAA | 1 | L2/20-221 | | Lee, Jian Chung (2019-11-17), Proposal for Emoji: ID Card |
| 14.0 | U+1FAAB | 1 | L2/19-316 | | Daniel, Jennifer (September 2019), Low Battery Emoji Proposal for Unicode 14.0 |
| 14.0 | U+1FAAC | 1 | L2/15-309 | | Pandey, Anshuman (2015-11-02), Proposal to encode the 'Hamsa' symbol in Unicode |
| 14.0 | U+1FAAC | 1 | L2/20-218 | | Grebet, O'Plérou; Pandey, Anshuman; Daniel, Jennifer (2020-08-06), Hamsa Emoji Proposal |
| 14.0 | U+1FAB7 | 1 | L2/19-371 | | Sarbar, Elnaz; Daniel, Jennifer (2019-10-03), Lotus Emoji |
| 14.0 | U+1FAB8 | 1 | L2/20-220 | | Klompen, Anna; Townsend, James; Chang, E. Sally; Mitchell, Michela; Helm, Rebecca (2020-04-21), Proposal for Emoji: Coral |
| 14.0 | U+1FAB9..1FABA | 2 | L2/20-217 | | Krenek, Christian (2020-03-31), Proposal for Emoji: Bird's Nest |
| 14.0 | U+1FAC3..1FAC4 | 2 | L2/20-190R | | Daniel, Jennifer (2020-03-27), Person and Man with Swollen Belly |
| 14.0 | U+1FAC3..1FAC4 | 2 | L2/21-055 | | Daniel, Jennifer (2021-02-22), ESC comments on 2020 Q4 feedback |
| 14.0 | U+1FAC3..1FAC4 | 2 | L2/21-071 (pdf, zip) | | Daniel, Jennifer (2021-04-22), ESC Report for 2021 Q2 UTC |
| 14.0 | U+1FAC3..1FAC4 | 2 | L2/21-066 | | Moore, Lisa (2021-05-05), "Consensus 167-C14", UTC #167 Minutes |
| 14.0 | U+1FAC5 | 1 | L2/20-189R | | Daniel, Jennifer (2020-07-22), Person Wearing Crown Emoji for Unicode 14.0 |
| 14.0 | U+1FAD7 | 1 | L2/20-065 | | Grebet, O'Plérou; Daniel, Jennifer (2019-11-10), Pour Emoji Proposal for Unicode 14.0 |
| 14.0 | U+1FAD8 | 1 | L2/20-226 | | Lee, Jian Chung (2020-09-09), Proposal for Emoji: BEANS |
| 14.0 | U+1FAD9 | 1 | L2/20-222 | | Sunne, Samantha; Hilborn, Andrea (2020-01-15), Proposal for Emoji: Jar |
| 14.0 | U+1FAE0 | 1 | L2/19-390 | | Daniel, Jennifer; Cohn, Neil (2019-12-04), Comparison of Unicode Faces and JVL morphemes |
| 14.0 | U+1FAE0 | 1 | L2/19-389 | | Daniel, Jennifer; Cohn, Neil (2019-12-04), Smileys for consideration for Unicode 14.0 |
| 14.0 | U+1FAE0 | 1 | L2/20-072 | | Cohn, Neil; Daniel, Jennifer; Carter, Erik (2020-02-21), Melting Face Proposal for Unicode 14.0 |
| 14.0 | U+1FAE1 | 1 | L2/19-396 | | Daniel, Jennifer; Fuman, Shiraz (2019-12-10), Saluting-Face Emoji for Unicode 14.0 |
| 14.0 | U+1FAE2 | 1 | L2/19-304 | | Daniel, Jennifer (July 2019), Face With Open Eyes and Hand Over Mouth Emoji Proposal for Unicode 14.0 |
| 14.0 | U+1FAE3 | 1 | L2/19-378 | | McCulloch, Gretchen; Gawne, Lauren; Daniel, Jennifer (2019-12-12), Face with Peeking Eye Proposal for Unicode 14.0 |
| 14.0 | U+1FAE4 | 1 | L2/20-219 | | Daniel, Jennifer (2020-06-26), Proposal for Face with Diagonal Mouth Emoji |
| 14.0 | U+1FAE5 | 1 | L2/20-223 | | Cohn, Neil; Daniel, Jennifer (October 2019), Dotted-Line-Face Proposal for Unicode 14.0 |
| 14.0 | U+1FAE6 | 1 | L2/19-219 | | Daniel, Jennifer (2019-06-19), Proposal for Biting Lip emoji |
| 14.0 | U+1FAE7 | 1 | L2/19-311 | | Peters, Jay (2019-08-20), Proposal for Emoji: Bubbles |
| 14.0 | U+1FAF0 | 1 | L2/19-327 | | Daniel, Jennifer (September 2019), Hand with index finger and thumb crossed Emoji Proposal |
| 14.0 | U+1FAF1..1FAF2 | 2 | L2/19-265 | | Daniel, Jennifer (July 2019), Right Hand Gesturing Right and Right Hand Gesturing Left (+ related ZWJ sequence to create Multi-Skintoned Handshake Emoji) for Unicode 14.0 |
| 14.0 | U+1FAF1..1FAF2 | 2 | L2/19-370R | | Daniel, Jennifer (2020-01-03), Recommendations for Emoji ZWJ Sequences for multi-skintoned handshake for Unicode 14.0 |
| 14.0 | U+1FAF1..1FAF2 | 2 | L2/20-015R | | Moore, Lisa (2020-05-14), "E.1.3.1 Recommendations for Emoji ZWJ sequences for multi-skintoned handshake for Unicode 14.0", Draft Minutes of UTC Meeting 162 |
| 14.0 | U+1FAF1..1FAF2 | 2 | L2/21-071 (pdf, zip) | | Daniel, Jennifer (2021-04-22), ESC Report for 2021 Q2 UTC |
| 14.0 | U+1FAF1..1FAF2 | 2 | L2/21-066 | | Moore, Lisa (2021-05-05), "Consensus 167-C9", UTC #167 Minutes |
| 14.0 | U+1FAF3..1FAF4 | 2 | L2/20-213 | | McCulloch, Gretchen; Gawne, Lauren; Daniel, Jennifer (2019-11-21), Hand with palm facing up and Hand with palm facing down for Unicode 14.0 |
| 14.0 | U+1FAF5 | 1 | L2/20-212 | | Pauluk, Marcel; Pschk, Ci (2020-06-24), Proposal for Emoji: Index Pointing at the Viewer |
| 14.0 | U+1FAF6 | 1 | L2/20-211 | | Joythe, René (2019-10-15), Proposal for Emoji: Heart Hands |
| 15.0 | U+1FA75..1FA77 | 3 | L2/21-201 | | Daniel, Jennifer (2019-11-07), Gray Heart Unicode Emoji Proposal |
| 15.0 | U+1FA75..1FA77 | 3 | L2/21-202 | | Daniel, Jennifer (2019-11-07), Light Blue Heart Emoji Proposal |
| 15.0 | U+1FA75..1FA77 | 3 | L2/21-203 | | Daniel, Jennifer; Gawne, Lauren (2020-01-20), Pink Heart Unicode Emoji Proposal |
| 15.0 | U+1FA75..1FA77 | 3 | L2/21-075 | | Daniel, Jennifer (2020-11-15), Examining Emoji Color Spaces: A Strategy for Improving the Coverage of Heart Emoji |
| 15.0 | U+1FA75..1FA77 | 3 | L2/21-128 | | Daniel, Jennifer (2021-07-20), "Heart Colors", Emoji Subcommittee Report Q3, 2021 |
| 15.0 | U+1FA75..1FA77 | 3 | L2/21-172R | | Daniel, Jennifer (2021-10-06), Emoji Subcommittee Report Q4, 2021 |
| 15.0 | U+1FA75..1FA77 | 3 | L2/21-167 | | Cummings, Craig (2022-01-27), "Consensus 169-C14", Approved Minutes of UTC Meeting 169, "Accept the repertoire of 21 provisional emoji candidates as documented in L2/21-172R" |
| 15.0 | U+1FA75..1FA77 | 3 | L2/22-021 | | Daniel, Jennifer (2022-01-25), Emoji Subcommittee Report Q1, 2022 UTC |
| 15.0 | U+1FA75..1FA77 | 3 | L2/22-016 | | Constable, Peter (2022-04-21), "Consensus 170-C20", UTC #170 Minutes, "Accept the following name changes in candidate emoji ..." |
| 15.0 | U+1FA75..1FA77 | 3 | L2/22-061 | | Constable, Peter (2022-07-27), "Consensus 171-C26", Approved Minutes of UTC Meeting 171, "Approve the 20 emoji draft candidates for encoding" |
| 15.0 | U+1FA87 | 1 | L2/21-194 (Note: See also L2/21-172R, L2/21-167 (Consensus 169-C14), L2/22-061 (Consensus 171-C26)) | | Rockwell, Jeanne (2019-12-16), Proposal for Emoji: Maracas |
| 15.0 | U+1FA88 | 1 | L2/21-193 | | Krenek, Christian (2019-04-30), Proposal for Emoji: FLUTE |
| 15.0 | U+1FAAD | 1 | L2/21-192 | | Jou, Stephanie; Mikolay, Matthew (2021-08-31), Proposal for Emoji: FOLDING HAND FAN |
| 15.0 | U+1FAAE | 1 | L2/21-218 | | Jones, Rhianna; Daniel, Jennifer (May 2021), Hair Pick Emoji Proposal |
| 15.0 | U+1FAAF | 1 | L2/21-223 | | Passmore, Lillian (2020-06-11), Proposal for Emoji: SIKH KHANDA |
| 15.0 | U+1FABB | 1 | L2/21-215 | | Sarbar, Elnaz; Daniel, Jennifer (2019-03-28), Proposal for Hyacinth Flower emoji |
| 15.0 | U+1FABC | 1 | L2/21-217 | | Klompen, Anna; Chang, E. Sally; Helm, Rebecca; Kim, Danbee; Mitchell, Michela; Townsend, James (July 2021), Jellyfish emoji proposal |
| 15.0 | U+1FABD | 1 | L2/21-198 | | Daniel, Jennifer (2021-07-23), Wing Emoji |
| 15.0 | U+1FABF | 1 | L2/21-219 | | Starsong, Teal (2019-10-28), Proposal for Emoji: GOOSE |
| 15.0 | U+1FACE | 1 | L2/21-197 | | Brand, Elliott (2018-09-26), Proposal for Moose Emoji |
| 15.0 | U+1FACE | 1 | L2/22-021 | | Daniel, Jennifer (2022-01-25), Emoji Subcommittee Report Q1, 2022 UTC |
| 15.0 | U+1FACE | 1 | L2/22-016 | | Constable, Peter (2022-04-21), "Consensus 170-C20", UTC #170 Minutes, "Accept the following name changes in candidate emoji ..." |
| 15.0 | U+1FACF | 1 | L2/21-196 | | Anderson, Charles D.; Krenek, Christian; Lee, Jennifer 8. (2020-01-20), DONKEY Emoji Proposal |
| 15.0 | U+1FADA | 1 | L2/21-200 | | Erb, Johannes; Fiedler, Pascal; Schumann, Paulina (2021-05-05), Proposal for Emoji: GINGER |
| 15.0 | U+1FADA | 1 | L2/22-021 | | Daniel, Jennifer (2022-01-25), Emoji Subcommittee Report Q1, 2022 UTC |
| 15.0 | U+1FADA | 1 | L2/22-016 | | Constable, Peter (2022-04-21), "Consensus 170-C20", UTC #170 Minutes, "Accept the following name changes in candidate emoji ..." |
| 15.0 | U+1FADB | 1 | L2/21-199 | | Hughes, Lucy (2020-02-20), Proposal for Emoji: PEAS |
| 15.0 | U+1FADB | 1 | L2/22-021 | | Daniel, Jennifer (2022-01-25), Emoji Subcommittee Report Q1, 2022 UTC |
| 15.0 | U+1FADB | 1 | L2/22-016 | | Constable, Peter (2022-04-21), "Consensus 170-C20", UTC #170 Minutes, "Accept the following name changes in candidate emoji ..." |
| 15.0 | U+1FAE8 | 1 | L2/21-214 | | Cohn, Neil; Daniel, Jennifer (October 2019), Shaking Face Proposal |
| 15.0 | U+1FAF7..1FAF8 | 2 | L2/21-216 | | Zell, Oliver (2020-08-31), Proposal for Emoji: Left Pushing Hand; Right Pushing Hand |
| 15.0 | U+1FAF7..1FAF8 | 2 | L2/22-061 | | Constable, Peter (2022-07-27), "Consensus 171-C26", Approved Minutes of UTC Meeting 171, "Approve the 20 emoji draft candidates for encoding, along with 10 skintone variants" |
| 16.0 | U+1FA89 | 1 | L2/23-256 | | Lattimore, Mary; Schear, Theo (2019-05-08), Proposal for Emoji: HARP |
| 16.0 | U+1FA89 | 1 | L2/23-236R | | Daniel, Jennifer (2023-11-02), Emoji Subcommittee Report for UTC #177 (2023Q4) |
| 16.0 | U+1FA89 | 1 | L2/23-231 | | Constable, Peter (2023-12-08), "Consensus 177-C2", UTC #177 Minutes, "Accept 7 emoji characters" |
| 16.0 | U+1FA8F | 1 | L2/23-259 (Note: See also L2/23-231 and L2/23-236R) | | Dekens, Tim (2020-06-16), Proposal for Emoji: SHOVEL |
| 16.0 | U+1FABE | 1 | L2/23-255 | | Baihaki, Brian (2022-05-25), Proposal for Leafless Tree Emoji |
| 16.0 | U+1FAC6 | 1 | L2/23-258 | | Fiumara, Gregory; Ferraro, Rafaella (2020-04-07), Proposal for Emoji: FINGERPRINT |
| 16.0 | U+1FADC | 1 | L2/23-257 | | Woodside, Thomas; Beninato, Nicholas (2021-08-23), Beet |
| 16.0 | U+1FADF | 1 | L2/23-261 | | Zeng, Aurora; Demir, Kamilé (2022-07-31), Splash Emoji |
| 16.0 | U+1FAE9 | 1 | L2/23-260 | | Collett, Erin (2018-12-27), Proposal for Emoji Eye Bags Face |
| 17.0 | U+1FA8A | 1 | L2/24-256 | | Ashley, Sarah; et al. (2019-11-22), Proposal for Emoji: Trombone |
| 17.0 | U+1FA8A | 1 | L2/24-226R | | Daniel, Jennifer (2024-11-06), Emoji Standard & Research Working Group Report for UTC #181 (2024Q4) |
| 17.0 | U+1FA8A | 1 | L2/24-221 | | Constable, Peter (2024-11-12), "Consensus 181-C5", UTC #181 Minutes, "Accept 8 new emoji characters" |
| 17.0 | U+1FA8E | 1 | L2/24-255 (Note: See also L2/24-226R and L2/24-221) | | Dow, Jacob (2024-07-31), Proposal for Emoji: Treasure Chest |
| 17.0 | U+1FAC8 | 1 | L2/24-251 | | Pignato, Andrew (2021-08-05), Proposal for Emoji: Bigfoot |
| 17.0 | U+1FACD | 1 | L2/24-249 | | Vives, Marcos Del Sol (2019-02-20), Proposal for Emoji: Orca |
| 17.0 | U+1FAEA | 1 | L2/24-250 | | Daniel, Jennifer (2024-07-08), Inflatable Face Emoji Proposal |
| 17.0 | U+1FAEF | 1 | L2/24-254 | | Cohn, Neil; Daniel, Jennifer (2024-07-09), Fight Cloud Emoji Proposal |
| 18.0 | U+1FA8B | 1 | L2/25-257 | | Daniel, Jennifer (2025-05-17), Meteor Emoji Proposal for Unicode 18.0 |
| 18.0 | U+1FA8B | 1 | L2/25-230R | | Daniel, Jennifer (2025-10-28), "1. ESC Emoji Recommendations for Unicode 18.0", Emoji Standard & Research Working Group Report for UTC #185 (revised) |
| 18.0 | U+1FA8B | 1 | L2/25-226 | | "Consensus 185-C31", UTC #185 Minutes, 2025-10-29, "Accept [...] new emoji characters ..." |
| 18.0 | U+1FA8C | 1 | L2/25-255 (Note: See also L2/25-230R and L2/25-226) | | Nakagawa, Karin (2024-04-15), Proposal for Emoji: Eraser |
| 18.0 | U+1FA8D | 1 | L2/25-258 | | Adan, Malik; Schear, Theo; Lee, Jennifer 8. (2020-03-01), Net With Handle Emoji Proposal |
| 18.0 | U+1FACC | 1 | L2/25-254 | | Whitaker, Amy (2025-04-22), Proposal for Emoji Monarch Butterfly |
| 18.0 | U+1FADD | 1 | L2/25-253 | | Scopel, Elizabeth (2025-07-31), Proposal for Emoji: PICKLE |
| 18.0 | U+1FAEB | 1 | L2/26-048 | | Daniel, Jennifer (2025-05-10), Cracked Smiling Face Emoji Proposal |
| 18.0 | U+1FAEB | 1 | L2/26-008R | | Daniel, Jennifer (2026-01-21), Emoji Standard & Research Working Group Report for UTC #186 |
| 18.0 | U+1FAEB | 1 | L2/26-003 | | "Consensus 186-C2", UTC #186 Minutes, 2026-02-01, "Change the character approved for Unicode Version 18.0 at U+1FAEB from FACE WITH SQUINTING EYES to CRACKING FACE ..." |
| 18.0 | U+1FAF9..1FAFA | 2 | L2/25-252 | | Olobayo, Daniel Nathaniel (2025-04-03), Proposal for Emoji: Thumb point |
