= Josh Gare =

English computer programmer

- Born: Joshua Gare; 20 September 1992 (age 34); Ascot, Berkshire United Kingdom
- Education: University of Bristol
- Occupations: Computer programmer, Internet entrepreneur
- Known for: Emoji

Josh Gare (born 20 September 1992) is an English computer programmer and internet entrepreneur. He is best known for facilitating the Emoji keyboard outside of Japan on iOS, which is a keyboard that can be used to send messages with emoticons. He studied Economics at the University of Bristol. During his time in Bristol he was named as "Bristol's best budding entrepreneur" by Epigram (newspaper).

== Personal life ==
Gare was born in Ascot, Berkshire, England in 1992 to Anthony Gare and Wendy Gare.

He was a student at the family's local Academy (English school), Ranelagh School in Bracknell, where he completed his A-levels in Summer 2011. Having completed his A level exams, he went on to study Economics at the University of Bristol whilst continuing his entrepreneurial activities.

== Emoji ==
Gare created the Emoji application for iOS in February 2010, which altered the Settings app to allow access to the emoji keyboard. Before the existence of Gare's Emoji app, Apple had intended for the emoji keyboard to only be available in Japan in iOS version 2.2. The only way to access the emoji keyboard in iOS was to use Gare's Emoji app, up until Apple made the keyboard available to those outside of Japan in iOS version 5.0.

== See also ==
- Emoji
