= Technically Media =

American media company

- Industry: Mass media
- Founded: 2009 in Philadelphia, Pennsylvania, U.S.
- Headquarters: Philadelphia, U.S.
- Website: technical.ly

Technically Media is an American media company. The company runs several outlets focusing on tech news, serving markets in New York City, Philadelphia, Baltimore, Delaware and the District of Columbia.

The company was founded in 2009 by Christopher Wink, Brian James Kirk, and Sean Blanda (who has since moved on) and is based in Philadelphia. The company finished 2016 with $1.67 million in revenue.

Kirk estimates about 40 percent of revenue comes from events, 40 percent from consulting gigs, 10 percent from ads, and 10 percent from grants.
