= Osage (Unicode block) =

- Range: U+104B0..U+104FF (80 code points)
- Plane: SMP
- Scripts: Osage
- Assigned: 72 code points
- Unused: 8 reserved code points

Unicode version history
- 9.0 (2016): 72 (+72)

Unicode documentation
- Code chart ∣ Web page

Osage is a Unicode block containing characters from the Osage alphabet, which was devised in 2006 for writing the Osage language spoken by the Osage people of Oklahoma, United States.

Osage^{[1]}^{[2]} Official Unicode Consortium code chart (PDF)
	0	1	2	3	4	5	6	7	8	9	A	B	C	D	E	F
U+104Bx	𐒰	𐒱	𐒲	𐒳	𐒴	𐒵	𐒶	𐒷	𐒸	𐒹	𐒺	𐒻	𐒼	𐒽	𐒾	𐒿
U+104Cx	𐓀	𐓁	𐓂	𐓃	𐓄	𐓅	𐓆	𐓇	𐓈	𐓉	𐓊	𐓋	𐓌	𐓍	𐓎	𐓏
U+104Dx	𐓐	𐓑	𐓒	𐓓					𐓘	𐓙	𐓚	𐓛	𐓜	𐓝	𐓞	𐓟
U+104Ex	𐓠	𐓡	𐓢	𐓣	𐓤	𐓥	𐓦	𐓧	𐓨	𐓩	𐓪	𐓫	𐓬	𐓭	𐓮	𐓯
U+104Fx	𐓰	𐓱	𐓲	𐓳	𐓴	𐓵	𐓶	𐓷	𐓸	𐓹	𐓺	𐓻				
Notes: 1. As of Unicode version 16.0; 2. Grey areas indicate non-assigned code points

== History ==
The following Unicode-related documents record the purpose and process of defining specific characters in the Osage block:

Version	Final code points (Note: Proposed code points and characters names may differ from final code points and names)	Count	L2 ID	WG2 ID	Document
9.0	U+104B0..104D3, 104D8..104FB	72	L2/14-068	N4548	Everson, Michael; Lookout, Herman Mongrain; Pratt, Cameron (2014-02-20), Preliminary proposal to encode the Osage script in the UCS
9.0	U+104B0..104D3, 104D8..104FB	72	L2/14-175	N4587	Everson, Michael; Lookout, Herman Mongrain; Pratt, Cameron (2014-07-30), Proposal to encode Latin characters for Osage in the UCS
9.0	U+104B0..104D3, 104D8..104FB	72		N4553 (pdf, doc)	Umamaheswaran, V. S. (2014-09-16), "10.4.2", Minutes of WG 2 meeting 62 Adobe, San Jose, CA, USA
9.0	U+104B0..104D3, 104D8..104FB	72	L2/14-214	N4619	Everson, Michael; Lookout, Herman Mongrain; Pratt, Cameron (2014-09-21), Final proposal to encode the Osage script in the UCS
9.0	U+104B0..104D3, 104D8..104FB	72	L2/14-177		Moore, Lisa (2014-10-17), "Proposal to encode Latin characters for Osage (C.4.2)", UTC #140 Minutes
9.0	U+104B0..104D3, 104D8..104FB	72	L2/14-268R		Anderson, Deborah; Whistler, Ken; McGowan, Rick; Pournader, Roozbeh; Iancu, Laurențiu; Glass, Andrew; Constable, Peter; Suignard, Michel (2014-10-27), "10. Osage", Recommendations to UTC #141 October 2014 on Script Proposals
9.0	U+104B0..104D3, 104D8..104FB	72	L2/14-250		Moore, Lisa (2014-11-10), "Consensus 141-C21", UTC #141 Minutes, "Accept 72 Osage letters at U+104B0..U+104FB, in block Osage U+104B0..U+104FF, with properties as documented in L2/14-214, for encoding in a future version of the standard."
9.0	U+104B0..104D3, 104D8..104FB	72	L2/16-052	N4603 (pdf, doc)	Umamaheswaran, V. S. (2015-09-01), "M63.07", Unconfirmed minutes of WG 2 meeting 63
