= Unicode symbol =

Unicode text character not part of a natural language script

In computing, a Unicode symbol is a Unicode character which is not part of a script used to write a natural language, but is nonetheless available for use as part of a text.

Many of the symbols are drawn from existing character sets or ISO/IEC or other national and international standards. The Unicode Standard states that "The universe of symbols is rich and open-ended," but that in order to be considered, a symbol must have a "demonstrated need or strong desire to exchange in plain text." This makes the issue of what symbols to encode and how symbols should be encoded more complicated than the issues surrounding writing systems. Unicode focuses on symbols that make sense in a one-dimensional plain-text context. For example, the typical two-dimensional arrangement of electronic diagram symbols justifies their exclusion. (Legacy characters such as box-drawing characters, Symbols for Legacy Computing and the Symbols for Legacy Computing Supplement, are an exception, since these symbols largely exist for backward compatibility with past encoding systems; a number of electronic diagram symbols are indeed encoded in Unicode's Miscellaneous Technical block.) For adequate treatment in plain text, symbols must also be displayable in a monochromatic setting. Even with these limitations – monochromatic, one-dimensional and standards-based – the domain of potential Unicode symbols is extensive. (However, emojis – ideograms, graphic symbols – that were admitted into Unicode, allow colors although the colors are not standardized. Color-dependent emojis are traditionally rendered using hatching in monochromatic settings.)

== Symbol block list ==
There are 172,808 characters, with Unicode 18.0, including the following symbol blocks:

- Alphanumeric variants (based on Latin characters in Unicode)
  - Currency Symbols (U+20A0–U+20CF)
  - General Punctuation (U+2000–U+206F)
  - Letterlike Symbols (U+2100–U+214F)
  - Number Forms (U+2150–U+218F)
  - Phonetic symbols (including IPA) (various blocks)
  - Superscripts and Subscripts (U+2070–U+209F)
- Enclosed variants
  - Enclosed Alphanumeric Supplement (U+1F100–U+1F1FF)
  - Enclosed Alphanumerics (U+2460–U+24FF)
  - Enclosed Ideographic Supplement (U+1F200–U+1F2FF)
- Arrows
  - Arrows (U+2190–U+21FF)
  - Dingbats arrows (U+2794–U+27BF)
  - Miscellaneous Symbols and Arrows (U+2B00–U+2BFF)
  - Miscellaneous Symbols and Arrows Extended (U+1DB00–1DBFF)
  - Supplemental Arrows-A (U+27F0–U+27FF)
  - Supplemental Arrows-B (U+2900–U+297F)
  - Supplemental Arrows-C (U+1F800-U+1F8FF)
- Mathematical
  - Mathematical Alphanumeric Symbols (U+1D400–U+1D7FF)
  - Mathematical Operators (U+2200–U+22FF)
  - Miscellaneous Mathematical Symbols-A (U+27C0–U+27EF)
  - Miscellaneous Mathematical Symbols-B (U+2980–U+29FF)
  - Symbols and Pictographs Extended-A (U+1FA70–U+1FAFF)
  - Supplemental Mathematical Operators (U+2A00–U+2AFF)
- Technical
  - Control Pictures (U+2400–U+243F)
  - Miscellaneous Technical (U+2300–U+23FF)
  - Optical Character Recognition (U+2440–U+245F)
- Musical
  - Znamenny Musical Notation (U+1CF00–1CFCF)
  - Ancient Greek Musical Notation (U+1D200–U+1D24F)
  - Byzantine Musical Symbols (U+1D000–U+1D0FF)
  - Musical Symbols (U+1D100–U+1D1FF)
- Games
  - Chess Symbols (U+1FA00–1FA6F)
  - Domino Tiles (U+1F030–U+1F09F)
  - Mahjong Tiles (U+1F000–U+1F02F)
  - Playing Cards (U+1F0A0–U+1F0FF)
- Emoji and emoticons
  - Dingbat (U+2700–U+27BF)
  - Emoticons (U+1F600–U+1F64F)
  - Miscellaneous Symbols (U+2600–U+26FF)
  - Miscellaneous Symbols Supplement (U+1CEC0–1CEFF)
  - Miscellaneous Symbols and Pictographs (U+1F300–U+1F5FF)
  - Supplemental Symbols and Pictographs (U+1F900–1F9FF)
  - Symbols and Pictographs Extended-A
  - Transport and Map Symbols (U+1F680..U+1F6FF)
  - Additional emoji can be found in the following Unicode blocks: Arrows, Basic Latin, CJK Symbols and Punctuation, Enclosed Alphanumeric Supplement, Enclosed Alphanumerics, Enclosed CJK Letters and Months, Enclosed Ideographic Supplement, General Punctuation, Geometric Shapes, Latin-1 Supplement, Letterlike Symbols, Mahjong Tiles, Miscellaneous Symbols and Arrows, Miscellaneous Technical, Playing Cards, and Supplemental Arrows-B.
- Miscellaneous
  - Alchemical Symbols (U+1F700–U+1F77F)
  - Arabic Mathematical Alphabetic Symbols (U+1EE00–U+1EEFF)
  - Block Elements (U+2580–U+259F)
  - Box Drawing (U+2500–U+257F)
  - CJK Compatibility (U+3300–U+33FF)
  - Combining Diacritical Marks for Symbols (U+20D0–U+20FF)
  - Common Indic Number Forms (U+A830–U+A83F)
  - Counting Rod Numerals (U+1D360–U+1D37F)
  - Enclosed CJK Letters and Months (U+3200–U+32FF)
  - Geometric Shapes (U+25A0–U+25FF)
  - Geometric Shapes Extended (U+1F780-U+1F7FF)
  - Indic Siyaq Numbers (U+1EC70–U+1ECBF)
  - Kaktovik Numerals (U+1D2C0–U+1D2DF)
  - Mayan Numerals (U+1D2E0–U+1D2FF)
  - Miscellaneous Symbols and Arrows (U+2B00–U+2BFF)
  - Ornamental Dingbats (U+1F650-U+1F67F)
  - Ottoman Siyaq Numbers (U+1ED00–U+1ED4F)
  - Religious and political symbols (various blocks)
  - Rumi Numeral Symbols (U+10E60–U+10E7F)
  - Supplemental Punctuation (U+2E00–U+2E7F)
  - Symbols for Legacy Computing (U+1FB00–U+1FBFF)
  - Symbols for Legacy Computing Supplement (U+1CC00–1CEBF)
  - Tai Xuan Jing Symbols (U+1D300–U+1D35F)
  - Yijing Hexagram Symbols (U+4DC0–U+4DFF)

== See also ==
- Special characters
- Unicode block
- Universal Character Set characters
