= Miscellaneous Symbols and Arrows Extended =

- Range: U+1DB00..U+1DBFF (256 code points)
- Plane: SMP
- Scripts: Common
- Assigned: 29 code points
- Unused: 227 reserved code points

Unicode Version History
- 18.0 (2026): 29 (+29)

Unicode documentation
- Code chart ∣ Web page

Miscellaneous Symbols and Arrows Extended is a Unicode block created as an extension of the Miscellaneous Symbols and Arrows block. Its initial allocation supports symbols used in the 17th century by G.W. Leibniz and other authors.

== Block ==
Miscellaneous Symbols and Arrows Extended^{[1]}^{[2]} Official Unicode Consortium code chart (PDF)
	0	1	2	3	4	5	6	7	8	9	A	B	C	D	E	F
U+1DB0x	𝬀	𝬁	𝬂	𝬃	𝬄	𝬅	𝬆	𝬇	𝬈	𝬉	𝬊	𝬋	𝬌	𝬍	𝬎	𝬏
U+1DB1x	𝬐	𝬑	𝬒	𝬓	𝬔	𝬕	𝬖	𝬗	𝬘	𝬙	𝬚	𝬛	𝬜			
U+1DB2x																
U+1DB3x																
U+1DB4x																
U+1DB5x																
U+1DB6x																
U+1DB7x																
U+1DB8x																
U+1DB9x																
U+1DBAx																
U+1DBBx																
U+1DBCx																
U+1DBDx																
U+1DBEx																
U+1DBFx																
Notes 1.As of Unicode version 18.0 2.Grey areas indicate non-assigned code points

== Variation sequences ==
The Miscellaneous Symbols and Arrows Extended block has one variation sequence defined for a standardized variant. It uses U+FE00 VARIATION SELECTOR-1 (VS01) to denote a variant symbol (depending on the font):

Variation sequences
Base character	Base	+VS01	Description
U+1DB10 CARTESIAN EQUALS SIGN	𝬐	𝬐︀	with descender

== History ==
The following Unicode-related documents record the purpose and process of defining specific characters in the Miscellaneous Symbols and Arrows Extended block:

Version	Final code points (Note: Proposed code points and characters names may differ from final code points and names)	Count	L2 ID	WG2 ID	Document
18.0	U+1DB00..1DB1C	29		N5334	Mayer, Uwe; et al. (2025-05-30), Proposal to encode historical mathematical relations
18.0	U+1DB00..1DB1C	29		N5334R	Mayer, Uwe; et al. (2025-11-24), Proposal to encode historical mathematical relations
18.0	U+1DB00..1DB1C	29		N5334R2	Mayer, Uwe; et al. (2026-01-19), Proposal to encode historical mathematical relations
18.0	U+1DB00..1DB1C	29	L2/26-054R2		Anderson, Debbie; Constable, Peter (2026-01-22), "3. Historical math relations", Proposed Leibniz additions for Unicode 18.0
18.0	U+1DB00..1DB1C	29	L2/26-003		"Consensus 186-C33 (accept characters) and 186-C34 (accept one variation sequence for U+1DB10)", UTC #186 Minutes, 2026-02-01

== See also ==
- Arrows in Unicode
- Arrows (Unicode block)
- Miscellaneous Symbols and Arrows (Unicode block)
- Supplemental Arrows-A (Unicode block)
- Supplemental Arrows-B (Unicode block)
- Supplemental Arrows-C (Unicode block)
