= Arrows (Unicode block) =

Unicode block

- Range: U+2190..U+21FF (112 code points)
- Plane: BMP
- Scripts: Common
- Assigned: 112 code points
- Unused: 0 reserved code points

Unicode Version History
- 1.0.0 (1991): 91 (+91)
- 3.0 (1999): 100 (+9)
- 3.2 (2002): 112 (+12)

Unicode documentation
- Code chart ∣ Web page

Arrows is a Unicode block containing line, curve, and semicircle symbols terminating in barbs or arrows.

== Block ==
Arrows^{[1]} Official Unicode Consortium code chart (PDF)
	0	1	2	3	4	5	6	7	8	9	A	B	C	D	E	F
U+219x	←	↑	→	↓	↔	↕	↖	↗	↘	↙	↚	↛	↜	↝	↞	↟
U+21Ax	↠	↡	↢	↣	↤	↥	↦	↧	↨	↩	↪	↫	↬	↭	↮	↯
U+21Bx	↰	↱	↲	↳	↴	↵	↶	↷	↸	↹	↺	↻	↼	↽	↾	↿
U+21Cx	⇀	⇁	⇂	⇃	⇄	⇅	⇆	⇇	⇈	⇉	⇊	⇋	⇌	⇍	⇎	⇏
U+21Dx	⇐	⇑	⇒	⇓	⇔	⇕	⇖	⇗	⇘	⇙	⇚	⇛	⇜	⇝	⇞	⇟
U+21Ex	⇠	⇡	⇢	⇣	⇤	⇥	⇦	⇧	⇨	⇩	⇪	⇫	⇬	⇭	⇮	⇯
U+21Fx	⇰	⇱	⇲	⇳	⇴	⇵	⇶	⇷	⇸	⇹	⇺	⇻	⇼	⇽	⇾	⇿
Notes 1.As of Unicode version 17.0

== Emoji ==
The Arrows block contains eight emoji: U+2194–U+2199 and U+21A9–U+21AA.

The block has sixteen standardized variants defined to specify emoji-style (U+FE0F VS16) or text presentation (U+FE0E VS15) for the eight emoji, all of which default to a text presentation.

Emoji variation sequences
U+	2194	2195	2196	2197	2198	2199	21A9	21AA
base code point	↔	↕	↖	↗	↘	↙	↩	↪
base+VS15 (text)	↔︎	↕︎	↖︎	↗︎	↘︎	↙︎	↩︎	↪︎
base+VS16 (emoji)	↔️	↕️	↖️	↗️	↘️	↙️	↩️	↪️

== History ==
The following Unicode-related documents record the purpose and process of defining specific characters in the Arrows block:

Version	Final code points (Note: Proposed code points and characters names may differ from final code points and names)	Count	L2 ID	WG2 ID	Document
1.0.0	U+2190..21EA	91			(to be determined)
1.0.0	U+2190..21EA	91	L2/99-176R		Moore, Lisa (1999-11-04), "Motion 80-M22", Minutes from the joint UTC/L2 meeting in Seattle, June 8-10, 1999
1.0.0	U+2190..21EA	91	L2/10-351	N3897	"6. Annotations to be changed for existing characters", Proposal to incorporate symbols of ISO/IEC 9995-7:2009 and Amendment 1 into the UCS, 2010-09-21
1.0.0	U+2190..21EA	91	L2/10-448		Constable, Peter (2010-10-30), "6. Annotations to be changed for existing characters", UTC Liaison Report from WG2
1.0.0	U+2190..21EA	91	L2/11-438 (Note: See also L2/10-458, L2/11-414, L2/11-415, and L2/11-429) (Note: Refer to the history section of the Miscellaneous Symbols and Pictographs block for additional emoji-related documents)	N4182	Edberg, Peter (2011-12-22), Emoji Variation Sequences (Revision of L2/11-429)
1.0.0	U+2190..21EA	91	L2/12-302	N4317	Pentzlin, Karl (2012-10-08), Revised proposal to incorporate the symbols of ISO/IEC 9995-7:2009
3.0	U+21EB..21F3	9		N1138	LaBonté, Alain (1995-01-30), Proposal to add new characters (Keyboard related) to 10646
3.0	U+21EB..21F3	9		N1203	Umamaheswaran, V. S.; Ksar, Mike (1995-05-03), "6.1.6", Unconfirmed minutes of SC2/WG2 Meeting 27, Geneva
3.0	U+21EB..21F3	9		N1303 (html, doc)	Umamaheswaran, V. S.; Ksar, Mike (1996-01-26), Minutes of Meeting 29, Tokyo
3.0	U+21EB..21F3	9	L2/97-128	N1564	Paterson, Bruce (1997-05-15), Draft pDAM for various additional characters (the "holding bucket")
3.0	U+21EB..21F3	9	L2/97-167	N1625	Suignard, Michel (1997-07-03), Report of ad hoc group on keyboard symbols
3.0	U+21EB..21F3	9		N1669	Position on PDAM-NN - Symbols - ref N1625, 1997-08-05
3.0	U+21EB..21F3	9	L2/97-288	N1603	Umamaheswaran, V. S. (1997-10-24), "7.3", Unconfirmed Meeting Minutes, WG 2 Meeting # 33, Heraklion, Crete, Greece, 20 June – 4 July 1997
3.0	U+21EB..21F3	9	L2/98-005R	N1682	Text of ISO 10646 - AMD 22 for PDAM registration and PDAM ballot, 1997-12-17
3.0	U+21EB..21F3	9		N1830 (html, doc)	Summary of Voting/Table of Replies - Amendment 22 - Symbols, 1998-04-15
3.0	U+21EB..21F3	9		N1816R	Paterson, Bruce (1998-09-22), Disposition of comments on PDAM.22 (2nd draft)
3.0	U+21EB..21F3	9	L2/98-320	N1898	ISO/IEC 10646-1/FPDAM 22, AMENDMENT 22: Keyboard Symbols, 1998-10-22
3.0	U+21EB..21F3	9		N1897	Paterson, Bruce; Everson, Michael (1998-10-22), Disposition of Comments - FPDAM22 - Keyboard Symbols - SC2 N3191
3.0	U+21EB..21F3	9	L2/99-010	N1903 (pdf, html, doc)	Umamaheswaran, V. S. (1998-12-30), Minutes of WG 2 meeting 35, London, U.K.; 1998-09-21--25
3.0	U+21EB..21F3	9	L2/99-126		Paterson, Bruce (1999-04-14), Text for FDAM ballot ISO/IEC 10646 FDAM #22 - Keyboard symbols
3.2	U+21F4	1	L2/01-142 (Note: Refer to the history section of the Miscellaneous Mathematical Symbols-B block for additional math-related documents)	N2336	Beeton, Barbara; Freytag, Asmus; Ion, Patrick (2001-04-02), Additional Mathematical Symbols
3.2	U+21F4	1	L2/01-156	N2356	Freytag, Asmus (2001-04-03), Additional Mathematical Characters (Draft 10)
3.2	U+21F4	1	L2/01-344	N2353 (pdf, doc)	Umamaheswaran, V. S. (2001-09-09), "7.7 Mathematical Symbols", Minutes from SC2/WG2 meeting #40 -- Mountain View, April 2001
3.2	U+21F5..21FF	11	L2/00-119	N2191R	Whistler, Ken; Freytag, Asmus (2000-04-19), Encoding Additional Mathematical Symbols in Unicode
3.2	U+21F5..21FF	11	L2/00-234	N2203 (rtf, txt)	Umamaheswaran, V. S. (2000-07-21), "8.18", Minutes from the SC2/WG2 meeting in Beijing, 2000-03-21 -- 24
3.2	U+21F5..21FF	11	L2/00-115R2		Moore, Lisa (2000-08-08), "Motion 83-M11", Minutes Of UTC Meeting #83

== See also ==
- Mathematical operators and symbols in Unicode
- Unicode input
