= Arrow (symbol) =

Graphical symbol or pictogram used to point or indicate direction

←o

Arrow
- In Unicode: U+2190–U+21FF

Graphical variants
- →
- Right pointing arrow

Related
- See also: Manicule

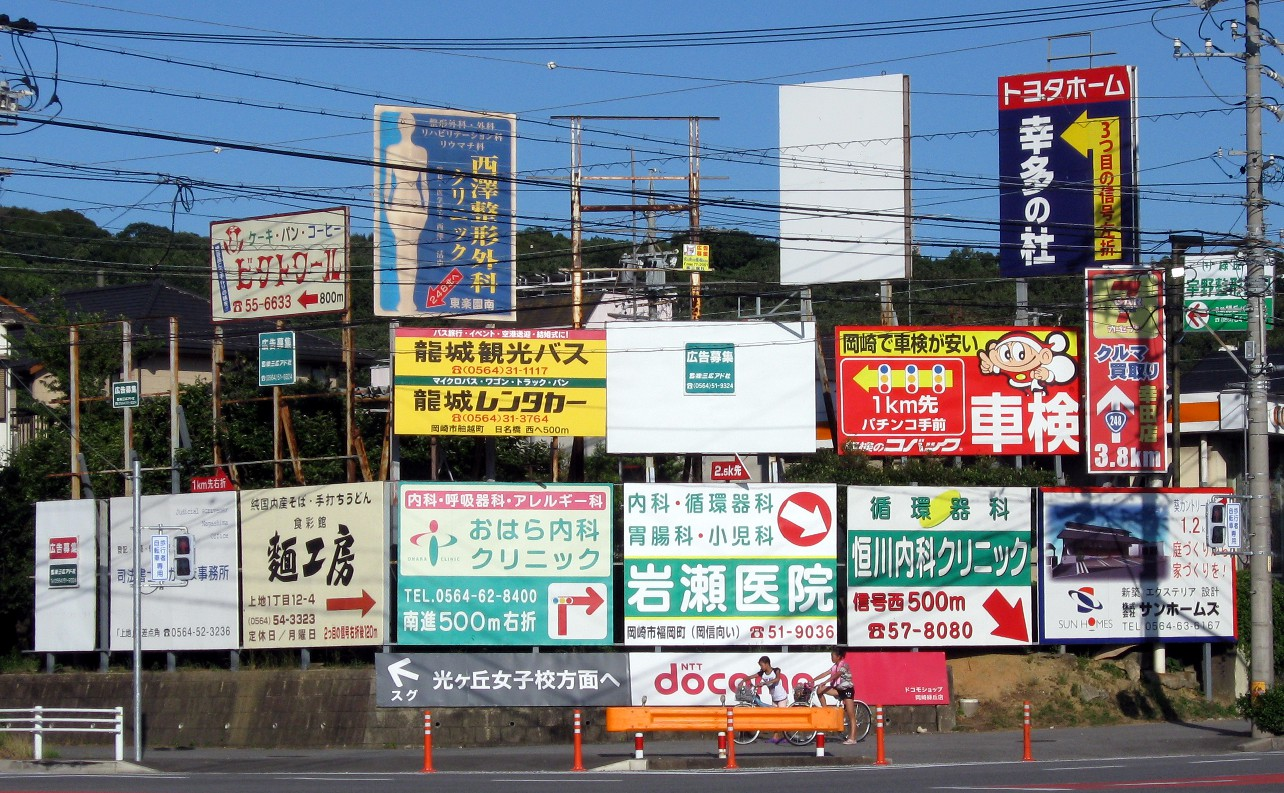
Advertising billboards in Okazaki, Japan, featuring many different arrow symbols

An arrow is a graphical symbol, such as ←, ↑, ↓ or →, or a pictogram, used to point or indicate direction. In its simplest form, an arrow is a triangle, chevron, or concave kite, usually affixed to a line segment or rectangle, and in more complex forms a representation of an actual arrow (e.g., ➵ U+27B5). The direction indicated by an arrow is the one along the length of the line or rectangle toward the single pointed end.

== History ==
An older (medieval) convention is the manicule (pointing hand, ☚). Pedro Reinel in c. 1505 first used the fleur-de-lis as indicating north in a compass rose; the convention of marking the eastern direction with a cross is older (medieval).

Use of the arrow symbol does not appear to pre-date the 18th century. An early arrow symbol is found in an illustration of Bernard Forest de Bélidor's treatise L'architecture hydraulique, printed in France in 1737. The arrow is here used to illustrate the direction of the flow of water and of the water wheel's rotation. At about the same time, arrow symbols were used to indicate the flow of rivers in maps.

A trend toward abstraction, in which the arrow's fletching is removed, can be observed in the mid-to-late 19th century. The arrow can be seen in the work of Paul Klee. In a further refinement of the symbol, John Richard Green's A Short History of the English People of 1874 contained maps by cartographer Emil Reich, which indicated army movements by curved lines, with solid triangular arrowheads placed intermittently along the lines.

== Main usage ==
An exit sign with an arrow to indicate the exit is to the left

Arrows are universally recognised for indicating directions. They are widely used on signage and for wayfinding, and are often used in road surface markings. A two-way road may be indicated by "↕" or "⇅".

== In mathematics and sciences ==
Upward arrows are often used to indicate an increase in a numerical value, and downward arrows indicate a decrease.

In mathematical logic, a right-facing arrow indicates material conditional, and a left-right (bidirectional) arrow indicates if and only if, an upwards arrow indicates the NAND operator (negation of conjunction), an downwards arrow indicates the NOR operator (negation of disjunction).

Use of arrow symbols in mathematical notation developed in the first half of the 20th century. David Hilbert in 1922 introduced the arrow symbol representing logical implication. The double-headed arrow representing logical equivalence was introduced by Albrecht Becker in Die Aristotelische Theorie der Möglichkeitsschlüsse, Berlin, 1933.

Knuth's up-arrow notation uses multiple up arrows, such as ⇈, for iterated, or repeated, exponentiation (tetration).

The quantum theory of electron spin uses either upward or downward arrows.

A vector may be denoted with an overhead arrow, such as in $\vec{x}$ or $\stackrel \longrightarrow{AB}$.

Some computer programming languages, like Haskell, use arrows (typed as ->) to denote a type class.

In chemistry, arrows indicate a chemical reaction. For example, 2H_{2} + O_{2} → 2H_{2}O shows that hydrogen and oxygen react to produce water.

== Graffiti ==
Arrows are regularly used in contemporary graffiti designs, incorporated as an element in both simplistic tags and complex wildstyle pieces. Arrows are used as a visual technique to make a graffito stand out or give it a sense of movement. The graffiti theoretician RAMM:ΣLL:ZΣΣ described adornments, such as arrows, in wildstyle paintings as ornaments that ‘armed’ the letters of a piece. The Philadelphia graffiti artist Cool Earl began using arrows in 1967, although the New York graffiti writer SJK 171 may have been the first to do so. The graffiti artist Mare139 is known for creating 3D sculptures of arrows.

== Unicode ==
In Unicode, the block Arrows occupies the hexadecimal range U+2190–U+21FF, as described below.

Symbol	Name	Symbol	Name	Symbol	Name	Symbol	Name
Hex	Name	Hex	Name	Hex	Name	Hex	Name
Picture of this symbol		Picture of this symbol		Picture of this symbol		Picture of this symbol	
←	Leftwards Arrow	↬	fd	⇈	Upwards Paired Arrows	⇤	Leftwards Arrow to Bar
U+2190	Leftwards Arrow	U+21AC	fd	U+21C8	Upwards Paired Arrows	U+21E4	Leftwards Arrow to Bar
↑	Upwards Arrow	↭	Left Right Wave Arrow	⇉	Rightwards Paired Arrows	⇥	Rightwards Arrow to Bar
U+2191	Upwards Arrow	U+21AD	Left Right Wave Arrow	U+21C9	Rightwards Paired Arrows	U+21E5	Rightwards Arrow to Bar
→	Rightwards Arrow	↮	Left Right Arrow with Stroke	⇊	Downwards Paired Arrows	⇦	Leftwards White Arrow
U+2192	Rightwards Arrow	U+21AE	Left Right Arrow with Stroke	U+21CA	Downwards Paired Arrows	U+21E6	Leftwards White Arrow
↓	Downwards Arrow	↯	Downwards Zigzag Arrow	⇋	Leftwards Harpoon Over Rightwards Harpoon	⇧	Upwards White Arrow
U+2193	Downwards Arrow	U+21AF	Downwards Zigzag Arrow	U+21CB	Leftwards Harpoon Over Rightwards Harpoon	U+21E7	Upwards White Arrow
↔	Left Right Arrow	↰	Upwards Arrow with Tip Leftwards	⇌	Rightwards Harpoon Over Leftwards Harpoon	⇨	Rightwards White Arrow
U+2194	Left Right Arrow	U+21B0	Upwards Arrow with Tip Leftwards	U+21CC	Rightwards Harpoon Over Leftwards Harpoon	U+21E8	Rightwards White Arrow
↕	Up Down Arrow	↱	Upwards Arrow with Tip Rightwards	⇍	Leftwards Double Arrow with Stroke	⇩	Downwards White Arrow
U+2195	Up Down Arrow	U+21B1	Upwards Arrow with Tip Rightwards	U+21CD	Leftwards Double Arrow with Stroke	U+21E9	Downwards White Arrow
↖	North West Arrow	↲	Downwards Arrow with Tip Leftwards	⇎	Left Right Double Arrow with Stroke	⇪	Upwards White Arrow from Bar
U+2196	North West Arrow	U+21B2	Downwards Arrow with Tip Leftwards	U+21CE	Left Right Double Arrow with Stroke	U+21EA	Upwards White Arrow from Bar
↗	North East Arrow	↳	Downwards Arrow with Tip Rightwards	⇏	Rightwards Double Arrow with Stroke	⇫	Upwards White Arrow on Pedestal
U+2197	North East Arrow	U+21B3	Downwards Arrow with Tip Rightwards	U+21CF	Rightwards Double Arrow with Stroke	U+21EB	Upwards White Arrow on Pedestal
↘	South East Arrow	↴	Rightwards Arrow with Corner Downwards	⇐	Leftwards Double Arrow	⇬	Upwards White Arrow on Pedestal with Horizontal Bar
U+2198	South East Arrow	U+21B4	Rightwards Arrow with Corner Downwards	U+21D0	Leftwards Double Arrow	U+21EC	Upwards White Arrow on Pedestal with Horizontal Bar
↙	South West Arrow	↵	Downwards Arrow with Corner Leftwards	⇑	Upwards Double Arrow	⇭	Upwards White Arrow on Pedestal with Vertical Bar
U+2199	South West Arrow	U+21B5	Downwards Arrow with Corner Leftwards	U+21D1	Upwards Double Arrow	U+21ED	Upwards White Arrow on Pedestal with Vertical Bar
↚	Leftwards Arrow with Stroke	↶	Anticlockwise Top Semicircle Arrow	⇒	Rightwards Double Arrow	⇮	Upwards White Double Arrow
U+219A	Leftwards Arrow with Stroke	U+21B6	Anticlockwise Top Semicircle Arrow	U+21D2	Rightwards Double Arrow	U+21EE	Upwards White Double Arrow
↛	Rightwards Arrow with Stroke	↷	Clockwise Top Semicircle Arrow	⇓	Downwards Double Arrow	⇯	Upwards White Double Arrow on Pedestal
U+219B	Rightwards Arrow with Stroke	U+21B7	Clockwise Top Semicircle Arrow	U+21D3	Downwards Double Arrow	U+21EF	Upwards White Double Arrow on Pedestal
↜	Leftwards Wave Arrow	↸	North West Arrow to Long Bar	⇔	Left Right Double Arrow	⇰	Rightwards White Arrow from Wall
U+219C	Leftwards Wave Arrow	U+21B8	North West Arrow to Long Bar	U+21D4	Left Right Double Arrow	U+21F0	Rightwards White Arrow from Wall
↝	Rightwards Wave Arrow	↹	Leftwards Arrow to Bar Over Rightwards Arrow to Bar	⇕	Up Down Double Arrow	⇱	North West Arrow to Corner
U+219D	Rightwards Wave Arrow	U+21B9	Leftwards Arrow to Bar Over Rightwards Arrow to Bar	U+21D5	Up Down Double Arrow	U+21F1	North West Arrow to Corner
↞	Leftwards Two Headed Arrow	↺	Anticlockwise Open Circle Arrow	⇖	North West Double Arrow	⇲	South East Arrow to Corner
U+219E	Leftwards Two Headed Arrow	U+21BA	Anticlockwise Open Circle Arrow	U+21D6	North West Double Arrow	U+21F2	South East Arrow to Corner
↟	Upwards Two Headed Arrow	↻	Clockwise Open Circle Arrow	⇗	North East Double Arrow	⇳	Up Down White Arrow
U+219F	Upwards Two Headed Arrow	U+21BB	Clockwise Open Circle Arrow	U+21D7	North East Double Arrow	U+21F3	Up Down White Arrow
↠	Rightwards Two Headed Arrow	↼	Leftwards Harpoon with Barb Upwards	⇘	South East Double Arrow	⇴	Right Arrow with Small Circle
U+21A0	Rightwards Two Headed Arrow	U+21BC	Leftwards Harpoon with Barb Upwards	U+21D8	South East Double Arrow	U+21F4	Right Arrow with Small Circle
↡	Downwards Two Headed Arrow	↽	Leftwards Harpoon with Barb Downwards	⇙	South West Double Arrow	⇵	Downwards Arrow Leftwards of Upwards Arrow
U+21A1	Downwards Two Headed Arrow	U+21BD	Leftwards Harpoon with Barb Downwards	U+21D9	South West Double Arrow	U+21F5	Downwards Arrow Leftwards of Upwards Arrow
↢	Leftwards Arrow with Tail	↾	Upwards Harpoon with Barb Rightwards	⇚	Leftwards Triple Arrow	⇶	Three Rightwards Arrows
U+21A2	Leftwards Arrow with Tail	U+21BE	Upwards Harpoon with Barb Rightwards	U+21DA	Leftwards Triple Arrow	U+21F6	Three Rightwards Arrows
↣	Rightwards Arrow with Tail	↿	Upwards Harpoon with Barb Leftwards	⇛	Rightwards Triple Arrow	⇷	Leftwards Arrow with Vertical Stroke
U+21A3	Rightwards Arrow with Tail	U+21BF	Upwards Harpoon with Barb Leftwards	U+21DB	Rightwards Triple Arrow	U+21F7	Leftwards Arrow with Vertical Stroke
↤	Leftwards Arrow from Bar	⇀	Rightwards Harpoon with Barb Upwards	⇜	Leftwards Squiggle Arrow	⇸	Rightwards Arrow with Vertical Stroke
U+21A4	Leftwards Arrow from Bar	U+21C0	Rightwards Harpoon with Barb Upwards	U+21DC	Leftwards Squiggle Arrow	U+21F8	Rightwards Arrow with Vertical Stroke
↥	Upwards Arrow from Bar	⇁	Rightwards Harpoon with Barb Downwards	⇝	Rightwards Squiggle Arrow	⇹	Left Right Arrow with Vertical Stroke
U+21A5	Upwards Arrow from Bar	U+21C1	Rightwards Harpoon with Barb Downwards	U+21DD	Rightwards Squiggle Arrow	U+21F9	Left Right Arrow with Vertical Stroke
↦	Rightwards Arrow from Bar	⇂	Downwards Harpoon with Barb Rightwards	⇞	Upwards Arrow With Double Stroke	⇺	Leftwards Arrow with Double Vertical Stroke
U+21A6	Rightwards Arrow from Bar	U+21C2	Downwards Harpoon with Barb Rightwards	U+21DE	Upwards Arrow With Double Stroke	U+21FA	Leftwards Arrow with Double Vertical Stroke
↧	Downwards Arrow from Bar	⇃	Downwards Harpoon with Barb Leftwards	⇟	Downwards Arrow with Double Stroke	⇻	Rightwards Arrow with Double Vertical Stroke
U+21A7	Downwards Arrow from Bar	U+21C3	Downwards Harpoon with Barb Leftwards	U+21DF	Downwards Arrow with Double Stroke	U+21FB	Rightwards Arrow with Double Vertical Stroke
↨	Up Down Arrow with Base	⇄	Rightwards Arrow Over Leftwards Arrow	⇠	Leftwards Dashed Arrow	⇼	Left Right Arrow with Double Vertical Stroke
U+21A8	Up Down Arrow with Base	U+21C4	Rightwards Arrow Over Leftwards Arrow	U+21E0	Leftwards Dashed Arrow	U+21FC	Left Right Arrow with Double Vertical Stroke
↩	Leftwards Arrow with Hook	⇅	Upwards Arrow Leftwards of Downwards Arrow	⇡	Upwards Dashed Arrow	⇽	Leftwards Open-Headed Arrow
U+21A9	Leftwards Arrow with Hook	U+21C5	Upwards Arrow Leftwards of Downwards Arrow	U+21E1	Upwards Dashed Arrow	U+21FD	Leftwards Open-Headed Arrow
↪	Rightwards Arrow with Hook	⇆	Leftwards Arrow Over Rightwards Arrow	⇢	Rightwards Dashed Arrow	⇾	Rightwards Open-Headed Arrow
U+21AA	Rightwards Arrow with Hook	U+21C6	Leftwards Arrow Over Rightwards Arrow	U+21E2	Rightwards Dashed Arrow	U+21FE	Rightwards Open-Headed Arrow
↫	Leftwards Arrow with Loop	⇇	Leftwards Paired Arrows	⇣	Downwards Dashed Arrow	⇿	Left Right Open-Headed Arrow
U+21AB	Leftwards Arrow with Loop	U+21C7	Leftwards Paired Arrows	U+21E3	Downwards Dashed Arrow	U+21FF	Left Right Open-Headed Arrow

=== By block ===
Arrows^{[1]} Official Unicode Consortium code chart (PDF)
	0	1	2	3	4	5	6	7	8	9	A	B	C	D	E	F
U+219x	←	↑	→	↓	↔	↕	↖	↗	↘	↙	↚	↛	↜	↝	↞	↟
U+21Ax	↠	↡	↢	↣	↤	↥	↦	↧	↨	↩	↪	↫	↬	↭	↮	↯
U+21Bx	↰	↱	↲	↳	↴	↵	↶	↷	↸	↹	↺	↻	↼	↽	↾	↿
U+21Cx	⇀	⇁	⇂	⇃	⇄	⇅	⇆	⇇	⇈	⇉	⇊	⇋	⇌	⇍	⇎	⇏
U+21Dx	⇐	⇑	⇒	⇓	⇔	⇕	⇖	⇗	⇘	⇙	⇚	⇛	⇜	⇝	⇞	⇟
U+21Ex	⇠	⇡	⇢	⇣	⇤	⇥	⇦	⇧	⇨	⇩	⇪	⇫	⇬	⇭	⇮	⇯
U+21Fx	⇰	⇱	⇲	⇳	⇴	⇵	⇶	⇷	⇸	⇹	⇺	⇻	⇼	⇽	⇾	⇿
Notes 1.As of Unicode version 18.0

Dingbats^{[1]} Official Unicode Consortium code chart (PDF)
	0	1	2	3	4	5	6	7	8	9	A	B	C	D	E	F
U+270x	✀	✁	✂	✃	✄	✅	✆	✇	✈	✉	✊	✋	✌	✍	✎	✏
U+271x	✐	✑	✒	✓	✔	✕	✖	✗	✘	✙	✚	✛	✜	✝	✞	✟
U+272x	✠	✡	✢	✣	✤	✥	✦	✧	✨	✩	✪	✫	✬	✭	✮	✯
U+273x	✰	✱	✲	✳	✴	✵	✶	✷	✸	✹	✺	✻	✼	✽	✾	✿
U+274x	❀	❁	❂	❃	❄	❅	❆	❇	❈	❉	❊	❋	❌	❍	❎	❏
U+275x	❐	❑	❒	❓	❔	❕	❖	❗	❘	❙	❚	❛	❜	❝	❞	❟
U+276x	❠	❡	❢	❣	❤	❥	❦	❧	❨	❩	❪	❫	❬	❭	❮	❯
U+277x	❰	❱	❲	❳	❴	❵	❶	❷	❸	❹	❺	❻	❼	❽	❾	❿
U+278x	➀	➁	➂	➃	➄	➅	➆	➇	➈	➉	➊	➋	➌	➍	➎	➏
U+279x	➐	➑	➒	➓	➔	➕	➖	➗	➘	➙	➚	➛	➜	➝	➞	➟
U+27Ax	➠	➡	➢	➣	➤	➥	➦	➧	➨	➩	➪	➫	➬	➭	➮	➯
U+27Bx	➰	➱	➲	➳	➴	➵	➶	➷	➸	➹	➺	➻	➼	➽	➾	➿
Notes 1.As of Unicode version 18.0

Miscellaneous Symbols and Arrows^{[1]}^{[2]} Official Unicode Consortium code chart (PDF)
	0	1	2	3	4	5	6	7	8	9	A	B	C	D	E	F
U+2B0x	⬀	⬁	⬂	⬃	⬄	⬅	⬆	⬇	⬈	⬉	⬊	⬋	⬌	⬍	⬎	⬏
U+2B1x	⬐	⬑	⬒	⬓	⬔	⬕	⬖	⬗	⬘	⬙	⬚	⬛	⬜	⬝	⬞	⬟
U+2B2x	⬠	⬡	⬢	⬣	⬤	⬥	⬦	⬧	⬨	⬩	⬪	⬫	⬬	⬭	⬮	⬯
U+2B3x	⬰	⬱	⬲	⬳	⬴	⬵	⬶	⬷	⬸	⬹	⬺	⬻	⬼	⬽	⬾	⬿
U+2B4x	⭀	⭁	⭂	⭃	⭄	⭅	⭆	⭇	⭈	⭉	⭊	⭋	⭌	⭍	⭎	⭏
U+2B5x	⭐	⭑	⭒	⭓	⭔	⭕	⭖	⭗	⭘	⭙	⭚	⭛	⭜	⭝	⭞	⭟
U+2B6x	⭠	⭡	⭢	⭣	⭤	⭥	⭦	⭧	⭨	⭩	⭪	⭫	⭬	⭭	⭮	⭯
U+2B7x	⭰	⭱	⭲	⭳			⭶	⭷	⭸	⭹	⭺	⭻	⭼	⭽	⭾	⭿
U+2B8x	⮀	⮁	⮂	⮃	⮄	⮅	⮆	⮇	⮈	⮉	⮊	⮋	⮌	⮍	⮎	⮏
U+2B9x	⮐	⮑	⮒	⮓	⮔	⮕	⮖	⮗	⮘	⮙	⮚	⮛	⮜	⮝	⮞	⮟
U+2BAx	⮠	⮡	⮢	⮣	⮤	⮥	⮦	⮧	⮨	⮩	⮪	⮫	⮬	⮭	⮮	⮯
U+2BBx	⮰	⮱	⮲	⮳	⮴	⮵	⮶	⮷	⮸	⮹	⮺	⮻	⮼	⮽	⮾	⮿
U+2BCx	⯀	⯁	⯂	⯃	⯄	⯅	⯆	⯇	⯈	⯉	⯊	⯋	⯌	⯍	⯎	⯏
U+2BDx	⯐	⯑	⯒	⯓	⯔	⯕	⯖	⯗	⯘	⯙	⯚	⯛	⯜	⯝	⯞	⯟
U+2BEx	⯠	⯡	⯢	⯣	⯤	⯥	⯦	⯧	⯨	⯩	⯪	⯫	⯬	⯭	⯮	⯯
U+2BFx	⯰	⯱	⯲	⯳	⯴	⯵	⯶	⯷	⯸	⯹	⯺	⯻	⯼	⯽	⯾	⯿
Notes 1.As of Unicode version 18.0 2.Grey areas indicate non-assigned code points

Supplemental Arrows-A^{[1]} Official Unicode Consortium code chart (PDF)
	0	1	2	3	4	5	6	7	8	9	A	B	C	D	E	F
U+27Fx	⟰	⟱	⟲	⟳	⟴	⟵	⟶	⟷	⟸	⟹	⟺	⟻	⟼	⟽	⟾	⟿
Notes 1.As of Unicode version 18.0

Supplemental Arrows-B^{[1]} Official Unicode Consortium code chart (PDF)
	0	1	2	3	4	5	6	7	8	9	A	B	C	D	E	F
U+290x	⤀	⤁	⤂	⤃	⤄	⤅	⤆	⤇	⤈	⤉	⤊	⤋	⤌	⤍	⤎	⤏
U+291x	⤐	⤑	⤒	⤓	⤔	⤕	⤖	⤗	⤘	⤙	⤚	⤛	⤜	⤝	⤞	⤟
U+292x	⤠	⤡	⤢	⤣	⤤	⤥	⤦	⤧	⤨	⤩	⤪	⤫	⤬	⤭	⤮	⤯
U+293x	⤰	⤱	⤲	⤳	⤴	⤵	⤶	⤷	⤸	⤹	⤺	⤻	⤼	⤽	⤾	⤿
U+294x	⥀	⥁	⥂	⥃	⥄	⥅	⥆	⥇	⥈	⥉	⥊	⥋	⥌	⥍	⥎	⥏
U+295x	⥐	⥑	⥒	⥓	⥔	⥕	⥖	⥗	⥘	⥙	⥚	⥛	⥜	⥝	⥞	⥟
U+296x	⥠	⥡	⥢	⥣	⥤	⥥	⥦	⥧	⥨	⥩	⥪	⥫	⥬	⥭	⥮	⥯
U+297x	⥰	⥱	⥲	⥳	⥴	⥵	⥶	⥷	⥸	⥹	⥺	⥻	⥼	⥽	⥾	⥿
Notes 1.As of Unicode version 18.0

Supplemental Arrows-C^{[1]}^{[2]} Official Unicode Consortium code chart (PDF)
	0	1	2	3	4	5	6	7	8	9	A	B	C	D	E	F
U+1F80x	🠀	🠁	🠂	🠃	🠄	🠅	🠆	🠇	🠈	🠉	🠊	🠋				
U+1F81x	🠐	🠑	🠒	🠓	🠔	🠕	🠖	🠗	🠘	🠙	🠚	🠛	🠜	🠝	🠞	🠟
U+1F82x	🠠	🠡	🠢	🠣	🠤	🠥	🠦	🠧	🠨	🠩	🠪	🠫	🠬	🠭	🠮	🠯
U+1F83x	🠰	🠱	🠲	🠳	🠴	🠵	🠶	🠷	🠸	🠹	🠺	🠻	🠼	🠽	🠾	🠿
U+1F84x	🡀	🡁	🡂	🡃	🡄	🡅	🡆	🡇								
U+1F85x	🡐	🡑	🡒	🡓	🡔	🡕	🡖	🡗	🡘	🡙						
U+1F86x	🡠	🡡	🡢	🡣	🡤	🡥	🡦	🡧	🡨	🡩	🡪	🡫	🡬	🡭	🡮	🡯
U+1F87x	🡰	🡱	🡲	🡳	🡴	🡵	🡶	🡷	🡸	🡹	🡺	🡻	🡼	🡽	🡾	🡿
U+1F88x	🢀	🢁	🢂	🢃	🢄	🢅	🢆	🢇								
U+1F89x	🢐	🢑	🢒	🢓	🢔	🢕	🢖	🢗	🢘	🢙	🢚	🢛	🢜	🢝	🢞	🢟
U+1F8Ax	🢠	🢡	🢢	🢣	🢤	🢥	🢦	🢧	🢨	🢩	🢪	🢫	🢬	🢭		
U+1F8Bx	🢰	🢱	🢲	🢳	🢴	🢵	🢶	🢷	🢸	🢹	🢺	🢻				
U+1F8Cx	🣀	🣁														
U+1F8Dx	🣐	🣑	🣒	🣓	🣔	🣕	🣖	🣗	🣘							
U+1F8Ex																
U+1F8Fx																
Notes 1.As of Unicode version 18.0 2.Grey areas indicate non-assigned code points

Symbols for Legacy Computing^{[1]}^{[2]} Official Unicode Consortium code chart (PDF)
	0	1	2	3	4	5	6	7	8	9	A	B	C	D	E	F
U+1FB0x	🬀	🬁	🬂	🬃	🬄	🬅	🬆	🬇	🬈	🬉	🬊	🬋	🬌	🬍	🬎	🬏
U+1FB1x	🬐	🬑	🬒	🬓	🬔	🬕	🬖	🬗	🬘	🬙	🬚	🬛	🬜	🬝	🬞	🬟
U+1FB2x	🬠	🬡	🬢	🬣	🬤	🬥	🬦	🬧	🬨	🬩	🬪	🬫	🬬	🬭	🬮	🬯
U+1FB3x	🬰	🬱	🬲	🬳	🬴	🬵	🬶	🬷	🬸	🬹	🬺	🬻	🬼	🬽	🬾	🬿
U+1FB4x	🭀	🭁	🭂	🭃	🭄	🭅	🭆	🭇	🭈	🭉	🭊	🭋	🭌	🭍	🭎	🭏
U+1FB5x	🭐	🭑	🭒	🭓	🭔	🭕	🭖	🭗	🭘	🭙	🭚	🭛	🭜	🭝	🭞	🭟
U+1FB6x	🭠	🭡	🭢	🭣	🭤	🭥	🭦	🭧	🭨	🭩	🭪	🭫	🭬	🭭	🭮	🭯
U+1FB7x	🭰	🭱	🭲	🭳	🭴	🭵	🭶	🭷	🭸	🭹	🭺	🭻	🭼	🭽	🭾	🭿
U+1FB8x	🮀	🮁	🮂	🮃	🮄	🮅	🮆	🮇	🮈	🮉	🮊	🮋	🮌	🮍	🮎	🮏
U+1FB9x	🮐	🮑	🮒		🮔	🮕	🮖	🮗	🮘	🮙	🮚	🮛	🮜	🮝	🮞	🮟
U+1FBAx	🮠	🮡	🮢	🮣	🮤	🮥	🮦	🮧	🮨	🮩	🮪	🮫	🮬	🮭	🮮	🮯
U+1FBBx	🮰	🮱	🮲	🮳	🮴	🮵	🮶	🮷	🮸	🮹	🮺	🮻	🮼	🮽	🮾	🮿
U+1FBCx	🯀	🯁	🯂	🯃	🯄	🯅	🯆	🯇	🯈	🯉	🯊	🯋	🯌	🯍	🯎	🯏
U+1FBDx	🯐	🯑	🯒	🯓	🯔	🯕	🯖	🯗	🯘	🯙	🯚	🯛	🯜	🯝	🯞	🯟
U+1FBEx	🯠	🯡	🯢	🯣	🯤	🯥	🯦	🯧	🯨	🯩	🯪	🯫	🯬	🯭	🯮	🯯
U+1FBFx	🯰	🯱	🯲	🯳	🯴	🯵	🯶	🯷	🯸	🯹	🯺					
Notes 1.As of Unicode version 18.0 2.Grey areas indicate non-assigned code points

Additional arrows can be found in the Combining Diacritical Marks, Combining Diacritical Marks Extended, Combining Diacritical Marks for Symbols, Halfwidth and Fullwidth Forms, Miscellaneous Mathematical Symbols-B, Miscellaneous Symbols and Pictographs, Miscellaneous Technical, Modifier Tone Letters and Spacing Modifier Letters Unicode blocks.

== See also ==
- Dingbat
- Box-drawing character
- Box Drawing (Unicode Block)
- Block Elements (Unicode Block)
- Geometric Shapes (Unicode block)
- HTML character entities
