= Down Sign =

Down Sign may refer to:

- A Nigerian-based design studio specializing in graphic design, motion graphics, illustration, printing, and more.
- A generic symbol for downloading, receiving data from a remote system
- One of the arrow keys on a computer keyboard
- Thumbs-down, a thumb signal
- ↓, the symbol for Logical NOR
- ↓, down in Combinatorial game theory

== See also ==
- Down (disambiguation)
- Sign (disambiguation)
- ↓ (disambiguation)
- Sign, an object, quality, or event whose presence or occurrence indicates the presence or occurrence of something else
- Relative direction, a downward direction
- Downgrade, reverting software (or hardware) back to an older version
- Downlink, signals coming down from a satellite, spacecraft, or aircraft
