= Arrow character =

Arrow character may refer to:

- Arrow (symbol), graphical symbols like → and ←
- List of Arrow characters, characters appearing in the television series Arrow
