= ← =

← or <- may refer to:

- an arrow (symbol), character of Unicode
- an arrow key or a backspace on a keyboard
- ←, <<, <-, representing the assignment operator in various programming languages
- a converse implication in logic
- the relative direction of left or back
- "Caused by" (and other meanings), in medical notation

== See also ==
- Arrows (Unicode block)
- Arrow (disambiguation)
  - ↑ (disambiguation)
  - ↓ (disambiguation)
  - → (disambiguation)
