= Combining Diacritical Marks for Symbols =

- Range: U+20D0..U+20FF (48 code points)
- Plane: BMP
- Scripts: Inherited
- Assigned: 33 code points
- Unused: 15 reserved code points

Unicode version history
- 1.0.0 (1991): 18 (+18)
- 3.0 (1999): 20 (+2)
- 3.2 (2002): 27 (+7)
- 4.1 (2005): 28 (+1)
- 5.0 (2006): 32 (+4)
- 5.1 (2008): 33 (+1)

Unicode documentation
- Code chart ∣ Web page

Combining Diacritical Marks for Symbols is a Unicode block containing arrows, dots, enclosures, and overlays for modifying symbol characters.

Its block name in Unicode 1.0 was simply Diacritical Marks for Symbols.

== Block ==
Combining Diacritical Marks for Symbols^{[1]}^{[2]} Official Unicode Consortium code chart (PDF)
	0	1	2	3	4	5	6	7	8	9	A	B	C	D	E	F
U+20Dx	◌⃐	◌⃑	◌⃒	◌⃓	◌⃔	◌⃕	◌⃖	◌⃗	◌⃘	◌⃙	◌⃚	◌⃛	◌⃜	◌⃝	◌⃞	◌⃟
U+20Ex	◌⃠	◌⃡	◌⃢	◌⃣	◌⃤	◌⃥	◌⃦	◌⃧	◌⃨	◌⃩	◌⃪	◌⃫	◌⃬	◌⃭	◌⃮	◌⃯
U+20Fx	◌⃰															
Notes: 1. As of Unicode version 16.0; 2. Grey areas indicate non-assigned code points

== History ==
The following Unicode-related documents record the purpose and process of defining specific characters in the Combining Diacritical Marks for Symbols block:

Version	Final code points (Note: Proposed code points and characters names may differ from final code points and names)	Count	L2 ID	WG2 ID	Document
1.0.0	U+20D0..20E1	18			(to be determined)
1.0.0	U+20D0..20E1	18	L2/06-181		Anderson, Deborah (2006-05-08), "2", Responses to the UTC regarding L2/06-042, Proposal for Additional Cyrillic Characters, "Please add an annotation to U+20DD saying that it can be used as the Cyrillic ten thousands sign"
1.0.0	U+20D0..20E1	18	L2/06-108		Moore, Lisa (2006-05-25), "Action item 107-A94", UTC #107 Minutes, "Add an annotation to the names list for U+20DD COMBINING ENCLOSING CIRCLE."
3.0	U+20E2..20E3	2	L2/97-206	N1668	Proposal to encode two symbols, 1997-08-05
3.0	U+20E2..20E3	2	L2/98-007	N1668R (pdf)	Joint proposal to encode two symbols, 1998-02-13
3.0	U+20E2..20E3	2	L2/98-039		Aliprand, Joan; Winkler, Arnold (1998-02-24), "3.C.3. Cartouche proposal for keyboard symbols", Preliminary Minutes - UTC #74 & L2 #171, Mountain View, CA - December 5, 1997
3.0	U+20E2..20E3	2	L2/98-082	N1668R (doc)	Joint proposal to encode enclosing screen and keycap, 1998-03-23
3.0	U+20E2..20E3	2	L2/98-286	N1703	Umamaheswaran, V. S.; Ksar, Mike (1998-07-02), "8.4", Unconfirmed Meeting Minutes, WG 2 Meeting #34, Redmond, WA, USA; 1998-03-16--20
3.0	U+20E2..20E3	2	L2/98-321	N1905	Revised text of 10646-1/FPDAM 23, AMENDMENT 23: Bopomofo Extended and other characters, 1998-10-22
3.0	U+20E2..20E3	2	L2/99-010	N1903 (pdf, html, doc)	Umamaheswaran, V. S. (1998-12-30), "6.7.6", Minutes of WG 2 meeting 35, London, U.K.; 1998-09-21--25
3.0	U+20E2..20E3	2	L2/17-086		Burge, Jeremy; et al. (2017-03-27), Add ZWJ, VS-16, Keycaps & Tags to Emoji_Component
3.0	U+20E2..20E3	2	L2/17-103		Moore, Lisa (2017-05-18), "E.1.7 Add ZWJ, VS-16, Keycaps & Tags to Emoji_Component", UTC #151 Minutes
3.2	U+20E4	1	L2/98-056		McGowan, Rick; Sampson, Geoffrey (1998-02-23), Triangular Overlay Character
3.2	U+20E4	1	L2/98-070		Aliprand, Joan; Winkler, Arnold, "4.C.1.", Minutes of the joint UTC and L2 meeting from the meeting in Cupertino, February 25-27, 1998
3.2	U+20E4	1	L2/99-021	N1941	McGowan, Rick (1998-12-07), Request for Addition of Triangular Overlay Character
3.2	U+20E4	1	L2/99-077.1	N1975	Irish Comments on SC 2 N 3210, 1999-01-20
3.2	U+20E4	1	L2/98-419 (pdf, doc)		Aliprand, Joan (1999-02-05), "Enclosing Triangle", Approved Minutes -- UTC #78 & NCITS Subgroup L2 # 175 Joint Meeting, San Jose, CA -- December 1-4, 1998
3.2	U+20E4	1	L2/99-176R		Moore, Lisa (1999-11-04), "Motion 80-M20", Minutes from the joint UTC/L2 meeting in Seattle, June 8-10, 1999
3.2	U+20E4	1	L2/99-232	N2003	Umamaheswaran, V. S. (1999-08-03), "7.2.1.2", Minutes of WG 2 meeting 36, Fukuoka, Japan, 1999-03-09--15
3.2	U+20E5..20E8	4	L2/00-119 (Note: Refer to the history section of the Miscellaneous Mathematical Symbols-B block for additional math-related documents)	N2191R	Whistler, Ken; Freytag, Asmus (2000-04-19), Encoding Additional Mathematical Symbols in Unicode
3.2	U+20E5..20E8	4	L2/00-234	N2203 (rtf, txt)	Umamaheswaran, V. S. (2000-07-21), "8.18", Minutes from the SC2/WG2 meeting in Beijing, 2000-03-21 -- 24
3.2	U+20E5..20E8	4	L2/00-115R2		Moore, Lisa (2000-08-08), "Motion 83-M11", Minutes Of UTC Meeting #83
3.2	U+20E9..20EA	2	L2/99-010	N1903 (pdf, html, doc)	Umamaheswaran, V. S. (1998-12-30), "6.7.6", Minutes of WG 2 meeting 35, London, U.K.; 1998-09-21--25
3.2	U+20E9..20EA	2	L2/01-142	N2336	Beeton, Barbara; Freytag, Asmus; Ion, Patrick (2001-04-02), Additional Mathematical Symbols
3.2	U+20E9..20EA	2	L2/01-156	N2356	Freytag, Asmus (2001-04-03), Additional Mathematical Characters (Draft 10)
3.2	U+20E9..20EA	2	L2/01-344	N2353 (pdf, doc)	Umamaheswaran, V. S. (2001-09-09), "7.7 Mathematical Symbols", Minutes from SC2/WG2 meeting #40 -- Mountain View, April 2001
4.1	U+20EB	1	L2/03-194	N2590	Freytag, Asmus (2003-06-09), Additional Mathematical and Letterlike Characters
4.1	U+20EB	1	L2/04-196	N2653 (pdf, doc)	Umamaheswaran, V. S. (2004-06-04), "RESOLUTION M44.5 (Additions of individual characters), item g", Unconfirmed minutes of WG 2 meeting 44
5.0	U+20EC..20EF	4	L2/04-406		Freytag, Asmus; Sargent, Murray; Beeton, Barbara; Carlisle, David (2004-11-15), Progress report on Mathematical Symbols
5.0	U+20EC..20EF	4	L2/04-410		Freytag, Asmus (2004-11-18), Twenty six mathematical characters
5.1	U+20F0	1	L2/07-011R	N3198R	Freytag, Asmus; Beeton, Barbara; Ion, Patrick; Sargent, Murray; Carlisle, David; Pournader, Roozbeh (2007-01-15), 29 Additional Mathematical and Symbol Characters
5.1	U+20F0	1	L2/07-015		Moore, Lisa (2007-02-08), "Mathematical Characters and Symbols (C.4)", UTC #110 Minutes
5.1	U+20F0	1	L2/07-268	N3253 (pdf, doc)	Umamaheswaran, V. S. (2007-07-26), "M50.16", Unconfirmed minutes of WG 2 meeting 50, Frankfurt-am-Main, Germany; 2007-04-24/27
