= ↑ =

The symbol ↑, an upward pointing arrow, also called up arrow, uparrow, or upwards arrow, may refer to:

== Notation ==
- ↑, a mathematical symbol for "undefined"
- ↑, a mathematical symbol for "approaching from below"
- ↑, a notation of Knuth's up-arrow notation for very large integers
- ↑, a mathematical game theory position Up
- ↑ or Sheffer stroke, the logical connective "not both" or NAND
- ↑, the APL function 'take'
- "Increased" (and similar meanings), in medical notation
- ↑, a chemical symbol for production of gas, which bubbles up.
- ↑, Tyr rune in Norse Heathenry.
- An egressive sound, in phonetics

== Character representations ==
- ↑, upwards arrow, a Unicode arrow symbol
- ↑, &uarr;, a HTML or XML character entity
- ↑, codepoint 8A (hex) in EBCDIC Code page 293, used for writing APL
- ↑, the glyph for character 94 (decimal) in ASCII until 1967, when it was replaced by the caret (^).

== See also ==
- Ꙟ, an archaic Romanian Cyrillic letter
- Arrow keys, on computer keyboards
- Arrow (disambiguation)
  - ↓ (disambiguation)
  - → (disambiguation)
  - ← (disambiguation)
- Up (disambiguation)
