= Supplemental Arrows-A =

Unicode character block

- Range: U+27F0..U+27FF (16 code points)
- Plane: BMP
- Scripts: Common
- Assigned: 16 code points
- Unused: 0 reserved code points

Unicode version history
- 3.2 (2002): 16 (+16)

Unicode documentation
- Code chart ∣ Web page

Supplemental Arrows-A is a Unicode block containing various arrow symbols.

== Symbols ==
Unicode Supplemental Arrows-A
Char	Math	U+	Unicode name	Notes
⟰		27F0	Upwards Quadruple Arrow	A quadruple variant of ↑.
⟱		27F1	Downwards Quadruple Arrow	A quadruple variant of ↓.
⟲		27F2	Anticlockwise Gapped Circle Arrow	A gapped variant of ↺.
⟳		27F3	Clockwise Gapped Circle Arrow	A gapped variant of ↻.
⟴	$\longrightarrow \!\!\!\!\!\!\!\!\! \oplus$	27F4	Right Arrow with Circled Plus	Includes a circled plus (⊕).
⟵	$\longleftarrow$	27F5	Long Leftwards Arrow	A long variant of ←.
⟶	$\longrightarrow$	27F6	Long Rightwards Arrow	A long variant of →.
⟷	$\longleftrightarrow$	27F7	Long Left Right Arrow	A long variant of ↔.
⟸	$\Longleftarrow$	27F8	Long Leftwards Double Arrow	A long variant of ⇐.
⟹	$\Longrightarrow$	27F9	Long Rightwards Double Arrow	A long variant of ⇒.
⟺	$\Longleftrightarrow$	27FA	Long Left Right Double Arrow	A long variant of ⇔.
⟻	$\longleftarrow \! \shortmid$	27FB	Long Leftwards Arrow from Bar	A long variant of ↤.
⟼	$\longmapsto$	27FC	Long Rightwards Arrow from Bar	A long variant of ↦.
⟽	$\Longleftarrow \! \shortmid$	27FD	Long Leftwards Double Arrow from Bar	A long variant of ⤆.
⟾	$\shortmid \! \Longrightarrow$	27FE	Long Rightwards Double Arrow from Bar	A long variant of ⤇.
⟿		27FF	Long Rightwards Squiggle Arrow	A long variant of ⇝.

== Block ==
Supplemental Arrows-A^{[1]} Official Unicode Consortium code chart (PDF)
	0	1	2	3	4	5	6	7	8	9	A	B	C	D	E	F
U+27Fx	⟰	⟱	⟲	⟳	⟴	⟵	⟶	⟷	⟸	⟹	⟺	⟻	⟼	⟽	⟾	⟿
Notes: 1. As of Unicode version 17.0

== History ==
The following Unicode-related documents record the purpose and process of defining specific characters in the Supplemental Arrows-A block:

Version	Final code points (Note: Proposed code points and characters names may differ from final code points and names)	Count	L2 ID	WG2 ID	Document
3.2	U+27F0..27FF	16	L2/99-049		Beeton, Barbara (1999-01-22), Addendum to L2/98-405: Request for assignment of codes to mathematical and technical symbols
3.2	U+27F0..27FF	16	L2/99-159		Beeton, Barbara (1999-06-01), Request for assignment of codes to mathematical and technical symbols that do not appear in Unicode 2.0 or ISO/IEC 10646
3.2	U+27F0..27FF	16	L2/99-176R		Moore, Lisa (1999-11-04), "Math", Minutes from the joint UTC/L2 meeting in Seattle, June 8-10, 1999
3.2	U+27F0..27FF	16	L2/99-238		Consolidated document containing 6 Japanese proposals, 1999-07-15
3.2	U+27F0..27FF	16	L2/99-244R		Beeton, Barbara (1999-08-26), Request for assignment of codes to mathematical and technical symbols that do not appear in Unicode 2.0 or ISO/IEC 10646
3.2	U+27F0..27FF	16		N2092	Addition of forty eight characters, 1999-09-13
3.2	U+27F0..27FF	16	L2/99-260R		Moore, Lisa (2000-02-07), "Math and Technical Symbols", Minutes of the UTC/L2 meeting in Mission Viejo, October 26-28, 1999
3.2	U+27F0..27FF	16	L2/00-033R		Whistler, Ken (2000-02-09), Encoding for STIX math symbols
3.2	U+27F0..27FF	16	L2/00-298	N2258	Sato, T. K. (2000-09-04), JIS X 0213 symbols part-2
3.2	U+27F0..27FF	16	L2/01-064		Ion, Patrick (2001-01-24), Mathematical Variant Symbols
3.2	U+27F0..27FF	16	L2/01-142 (Note: Refer to the history section of the Miscellaneous Mathematical Symbols-B block for additional math-related documents)	N2336	Beeton, Barbara; Freytag, Asmus; Ion, Patrick (2001-04-02), Additional Mathematical Symbols
3.2	U+27F0..27FF	16	L2/01-147 (pdf, html)	N2343	Everson, Michael (2001-04-03), Encoding of Long Arrows
3.2	U+27F0..27FF	16	L2/01-156	N2356	Freytag, Asmus (2001-04-03), Additional Mathematical Characters (Draft 10)
3.2	U+27F0..27FF	16	L2/01-344	N2353 (pdf, doc)	Umamaheswaran, V. S. (2001-09-09), "7.7 Mathematical Symbols", Minutes from SC2/WG2 meeting #40 -- Mountain View, April 2001
3.2	U+27F0..27FF	16	L2/01-386R	N2389R	Suignard, Michel (2001-10-26), "Ireland: Negative", Disposition of comments on SC2 N 3530 (FPDAM text for Amendment 1 to ISO/IEC 10646-1:2000) - revised version

== See also ==
- Mathematical operators and symbols in Unicode
