= ↓ =

The arrow symbol ↓ may refer to:

- The downward direction, a relative direction
- The keyboard cursor control key, an arrow key
- A downwards arrow, a Unicode arrow symbol
- Logical NOR, operator which produces a result that is the negation of logical OR
- An undefined object, in mathematical well-definition
- A mathematical symbol for "approaching from above"
- A comma category, in category theory
- Down (game theory), a mathematical game
- An ingressive sound, in phonetics
- An APL function
- "Decreased" (and similar meanings), in medical notation
- The precipitation of an insoluble solid, in chemical notation

== See also ==
- Down sign (disambiguation)
- Arrow (disambiguation)
  - ↑ (disambiguation)
  - → (disambiguation)
  - ← (disambiguation)
