= → =

→ or -> may refer to:

== Mathematics ==
- The set of all mathematical functions that map from one set to another in set theory
- Material implication in logic
- Morphism in category theory
- Vector (geometric) in physics and mathematics
- Conway chained arrow notation for very large integers

== Programming ==
- →, ->, representing the assignment operator in various programming languages
- ->, a pointer operator in C and C++ where a->b is synonymous with (*a).b (except when either -> or * has been overridden in C++)
- →, goto in the APL programming language

== Other uses ==
- One of the arrow symbols, characters of Unicode
- One of the arrow keys, on a keyboard
- The direction of a chemical reaction in a chemical equation
- The relative direction of right or forward
- "Due to" (and other meanings), in medical notation
- The button that starts playback of a recording on a media player
- →, representing a phonological shift in linguistic notation

== See also ==
- Arrow (disambiguation)
  - ↑ (disambiguation)
  - ↓ (disambiguation)
  - ← (disambiguation)
- "Harpoons":
  - ↼
  - ↽
  - ↾
  - ↿
  - ⇀
  - ⇁
  - ⇂
  - ⇃
  - ⇋
  - ⇌
