= Arrow keys =

Cluster of keys on a computer keyboard

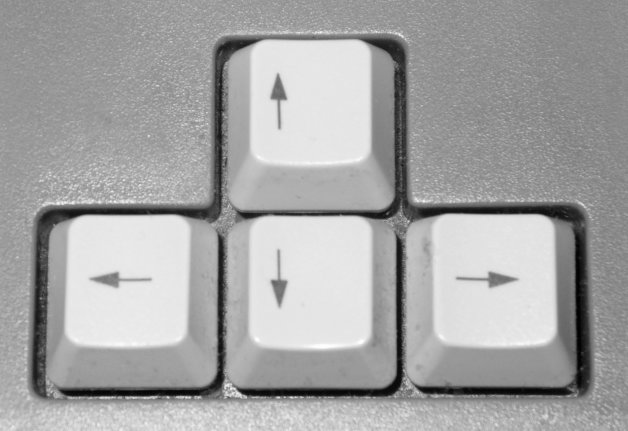

The arrow keys (↑ Up, ↓ Down, ← Left, and → Right) are the four keys on a computer keyboard labelled with directional arrows, typically found in an inverted-T layout to the bottom-right of the keyboard and to the left of the numeric keypad. They are a subset of the cursor keys, which include others like the Home, End, and Page Up/Down keys.

The arrow keys have a wide variety of functions. In a command-line interface (CLI), text box, or word processor, they typically enable caret navigation, allowing the user to move the text cursor between characters and lines. Meanwhile, in graphical user interfaces (GUIs), file viewers, and web browsers, the keys are generally used for scrolling, providing an alternative to dragging a scrollbar with a mouse pointer. Specific kinds of software make use of the arrow keys in more unique ways: they are used in most media player software to skip backward or forward through audio and video files, and they are used in some video games to make a player character move around a virtual space (although modern games typically use the WASD keys for this purpose).

The cursor keys predated the mouse pointer and were the primary means of cursor movement in the CLIs of the early 1980s. The modern layout and position of the arrow keys was established by the LK201 keyboard, released in 1982 by Digital Equipment Corporation; its design was replicated by larger companies like IBM and Apple and became the industry standard. Today, the arrow keys are included in that layout on almost all keyboards.

== History ==
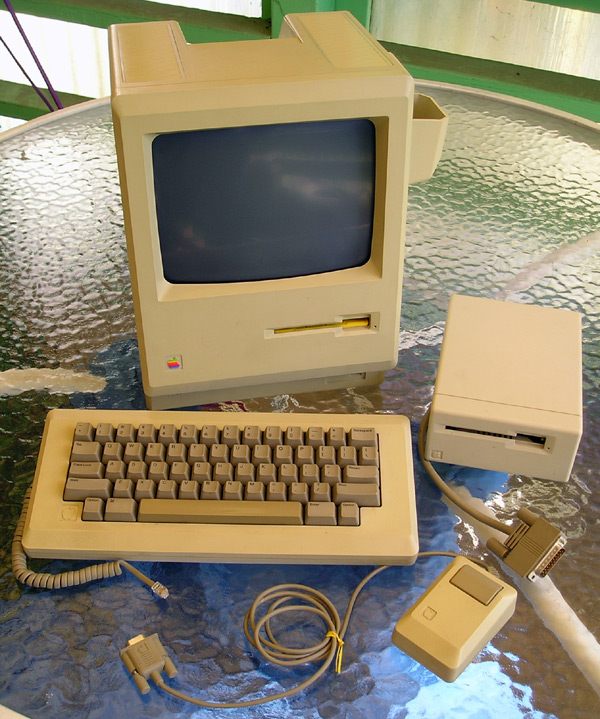
The Macintosh 512K, the first update to the original Macintosh, had no arrow keys.

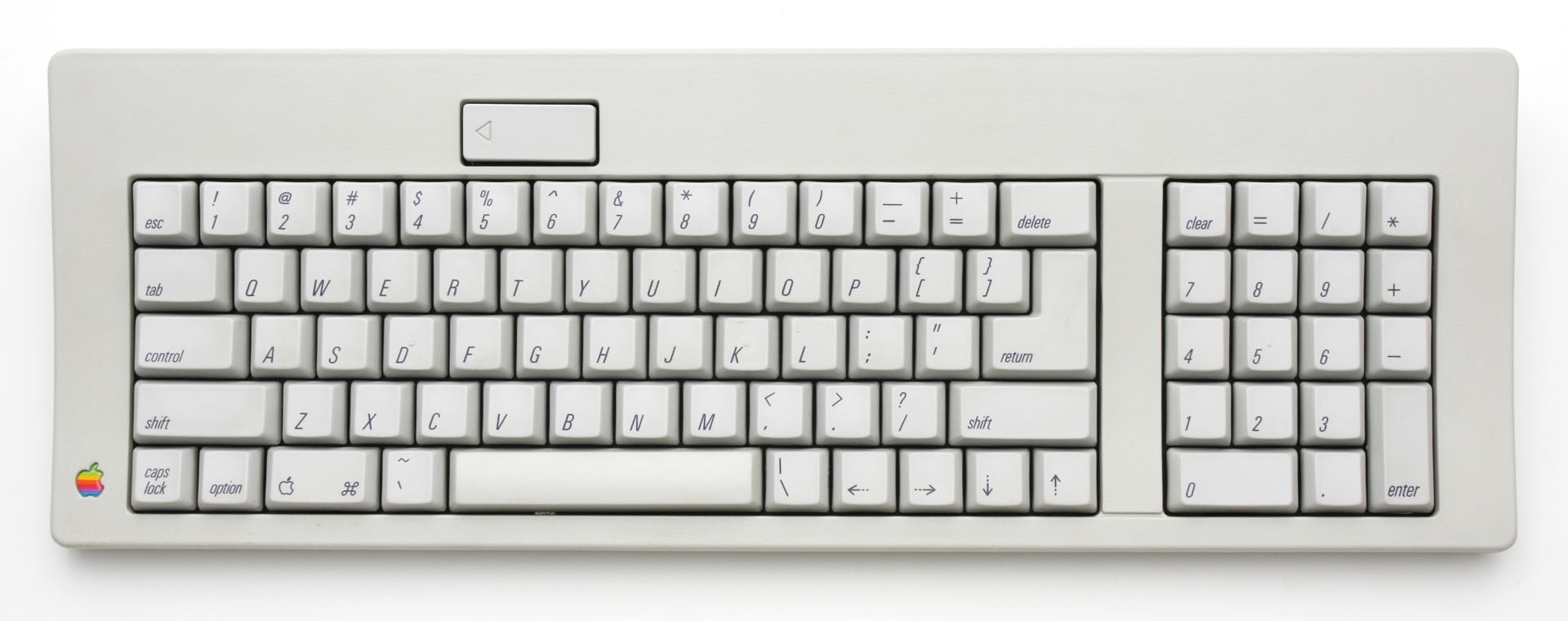
The Apple Standard Keyboard M0116 arranged the arrow keys horizontally below the Shift key.

Before the computer mouse was widespread, arrow keys were the primary way of moving a cursor on screen. Mouse keys is a feature that allows controlling a mouse cursor with arrow keys instead. A feature echoed in the Amiga whereby holding the Amiga key would allow a person to move the pointer with the cursor keys in the Workbench (operating system), but most games require a mouse or joystick. The use of arrow keys in games has come back into fashion from the late 1980s and early 1990s when joysticks were a must, and were usually used in preference to arrow keys with some games not supporting any keys. It can be used instead of WASD keys, to play games using those keys.

The inverted-T layout was popularized by the Digital Equipment Corporation LK201 keyboard from 1982.

Most Commodore 8-bit computers used two cursor keys instead of four, with directions selected using the Shift key.

The original Macintosh had no arrow keys at the insistence of Steve Jobs, who wished to force users and developers to acclimate to the computer mouse. Arrow keys were included in later Apple keyboards; early models with arrow keys but no middle section (⇱ Home, ⇲ End, etc.) placed them in a line below the right Shift key, while later versions had a standard inverted-T layout, either in the middle block or as half-height keys at the bottom right of the main keyboard.

== Common uses ==
The arrow keys are used in many applications to do different things such as:

- Moving text cursor to the right, left, previous line and next line
- Additional text based actions can be achieved by holding a Modifier key i.e., ⇧ Shift for selection and ⌃ Ctrl for word based movement
- In word processors, arrow keys can also be combined with modifier keys to select text by character, word, or paragraph; for example, Microsoft Word uses Shift+Arrow keys to select text and Ctrl+Shift+Arrow keys to extend a selection by word or paragraph.
- Moving player's character in video games
- Scrolling down and up in different documents and web pages
- Changing the current selected item in a list or selecting file icon near to the current selected file in a file explorer
- Moving selected object in a drawing software
- In multimedia players, the left and right arrows are often used to move forward and backward, while the up and down keys are used to increase and decrease the volume of the playback

== Alternative keys ==
Although the "arrow keys" provide one convention for cursor movement on computers, there are also other conventions for cursor movement that use entirely different keys.

=== 5678 keys ===
This cursor key layout was seen in Sinclair ZX80, ZX81, and ZX Spectrum home computer designs. These machines had 40-key alphanumeric keyboards with one or two shift keys for producing symbols or invoking secondary functions. Number keys from 5 to 8 doubled as cursor control keys when used together with a shift key, putting them in a broadly similar position to the Dec VT100 but in the order of the ADM-3A. These were labelled with left-, down-, up-, and right-arrow symbols printed on or directly above them in a colour matching the relevant shift key (CAPS SHIFT in particular from Spectrum onwards). The Jupiter Ace keyboard was similar but with up and down functions swapped.

In some software for these machines (e.g. games), the unshifted 5, 6, 7, and 8 keys were directly associated with direction control when they had no other purpose, as this meant less complicated keypress detection routines could be used. The corresponding character codes returned by ROM routines varied between machines, with Spectrum and Ace designs having the order of up and down keys on the keyboard reflecting which had the lesser and greater numeric value.

Although the QL-style keyboard on later Spectrum + and + 128K models introduced various dedicated keys including arrow keys either side of the space bar (left/right in a pair to its immediate left, and up/down to the immediate right) and removed related labels, either method produced the same signals and there was no difference between which of the alternatives was used as far as software was concerned.

=== WASD keys ===
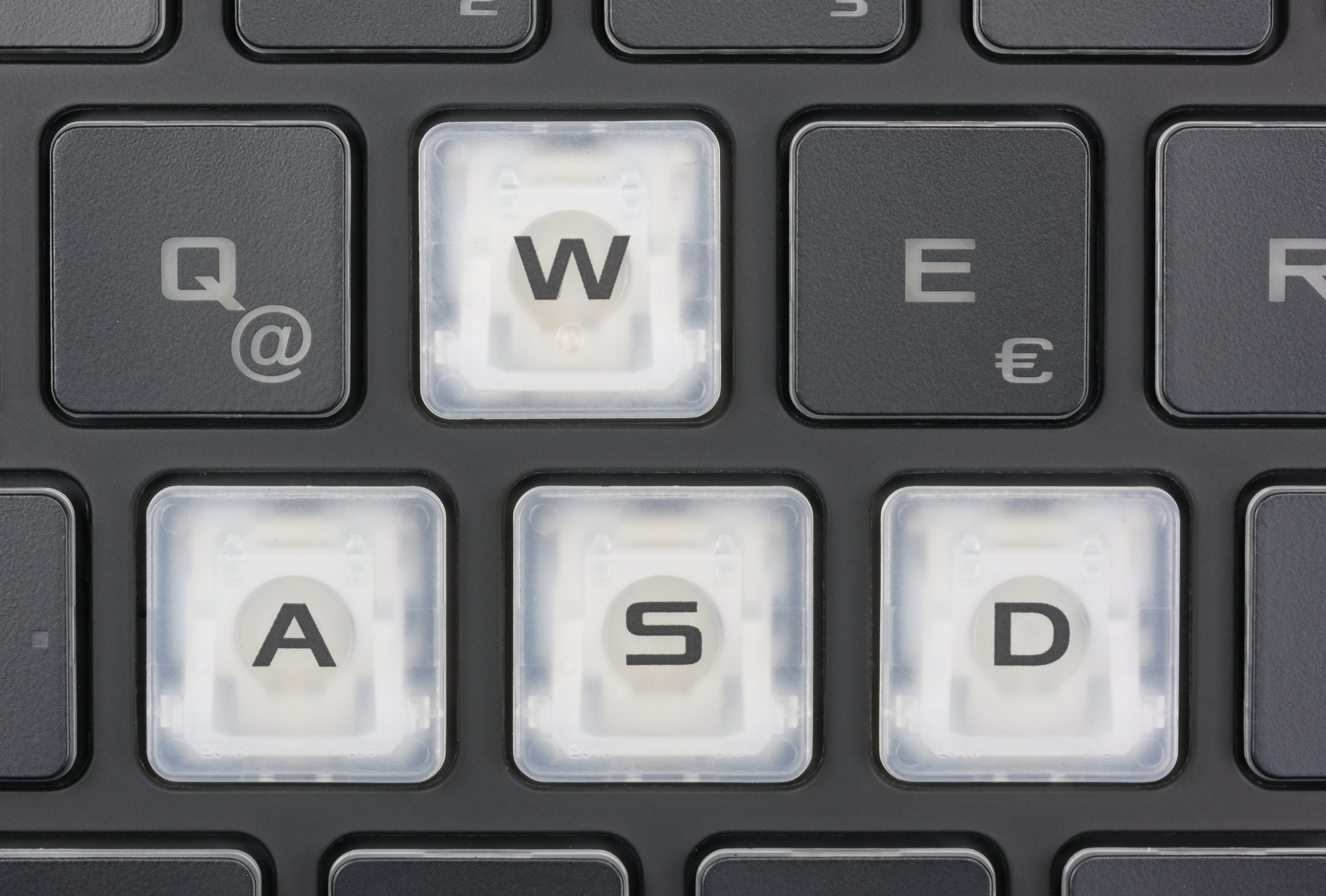
WASD keys on a gaming laptop

WASD (,AOE on Dvorak keyboards; ZQSD on AZERTY keyboards) is a set of four keys on a QWERTY or QWERTZ computer keyboard that mimic the inverted-T configuration of the arrow keys. These keys are most commonly used to control the player character's movement in computer games. W/S control forward and backward, while A/D control strafing left and right.

The main reason for this arrangement is that the arrow keys are not ergonomic to use with a right-handed mouse. During the early days of gaming, this was not a problem as the mouse was not used; the arrow keys controlled both movement ↑↓ as well as looking around ←→, with strafing done using modifier keys (usually Alt + ←→). However, the introduction of mouselook, a system that let one use the mouse to look around both vertically and horizontally, enabled the player to perform techniques such as smooth circle strafing, which, although possible with the keyboard, was difficult to perform and resulted in jagged movement. Since the mouse was now used for looking, the ← and → keys for looking would be redundant and thus were altered to become strafe keys.

The style was popularized in competitive play in Quake and subsequently QuakeWorld, notably by professional player Dennis Fong, where the advantages of WASD and mouselook were recognized over a purely keyboard-based control system. In the same year that Castle Wolfenstein was released, 1981, the game Wizardry used the AWD keys for movement in a first-person dungeon. Both the programmers of Castle Wolfenstein and Wizardry were users of the earlier PLATO system where the game Moria used the AWD keys.

Another advantage of WASD is that it allows the user to use the left-hand thumb to press the space bar (often the jump command) and the left-hand little finger to press the Ctrl or ⇧ Shift keys (often the crouch and sprint commands), as opposed to the arrow keys which lack other keys in proximity to press. Ctrl and ⇧ Shift were chosen partly because they are larger keys and thus easier to hit, but primarily because in older systems the computer could only recognize a couple of alphanumeric key presses, a limitation circumvented by the use of modifier keys. In later games, the usage of the E key to interact with items or open up the inventory, and the R key to reload a gun, were also popularized due to its location next to the WASD keys, allowing players to reach it quickly.

Telengard (1982) may be the first game to use WASD keys; Dark Castle (1986) may be the first to use WASD keys and mouse for control. Half-Life (1998) was one of the first mainstream games to use WASD by default. After being popularized by first-person shooters, WASD became more common in other computer game genres as well. Many of the games that have adopted this layout use a first-person or over-the-shoulder third-person perspective. Some games that use overhead camera views also use WASD to move the camera, such as some city-building games and economic simulation games.

=== ESDF keys ===
The ESDF variation is an alternative to WASD and is sometimes preferred because it provides access to movement independent keys for the little finger (Q, A, Z) which generally allows for more advanced manual binding. Incidentally, it allows the left hand to remain in the home row with the advantage of the F key home row marker (available on most standard keyboards) to easily return to position with the index finger. Moreover, these keys are compatible with both QWERTY and AZERTY keyboard layouts, which is a major plus if the game is also released in France or Belgium.

Perhaps the earliest game to use ESDF was Crossfire (1981), which used the keys for firing in multiple directions. Dan "vise" Larsen from Quake Team Deathmatch clan "clan Kapitol" popularized ESDF as an alternative to "WASD", explaining that the player gains three additional keys to bind the Quake game's controls to. It is the default configuration for several games, such as Tribes 2. The game Blackthorne used a combination of arrow keys for movement and ESDF for actions.

Some players use RDFG or TFGH to give access to even more keys (S and X for the little finger).

=== DCAS keys ===
Another alternate to the WASD shooter movement style is DCAS (sometimes called ASDC). In this configuration, D and C control forward and backward motion, while A and S control side-stepping (strafing). Typically the Alt key is utilized for crouching instead of the Ctrl key, as it is more easily reached when the hand is positioned for DCAS.

When Bungie's first-person shooter Marathon was released in 1994, it featured up/down look control and the option to fully control turning and aiming by mouse (a feature later popularized by id's Quake as mouselook/freelook). However, it did not include a set of default controls to handle this. With WASD not yet a well-known standard, some people devised their own control schemes to handle combined keyboard movement with mouse aiming; DCAS was one such control scheme.

Like WASD, DCAS allows the player to easily utilize the left modifier keys; this is advantageous because on most keyboards, the circuitry is better at tracking multiple key-presses simultaneously if some of them are modifier keys. But unlike WASD, the position of the left hand for DCAS gameplay is very similar to the left hand's position on the home row keys. This is very comfortable for right-handed players and seen as the primary advantage over using WASD, but it is ill-suited for left-handed mousing.

=== IJKL keys ===
Two early games that used IJKL were Crossfire (1981) and Lode Runner (1983).

IJKL is used by a growing number of browser games. These games cannot use the arrow keys because many browsers' windows will scroll if the arrow keys are used, thus hindering gameplay. This is a problem specific to DHTML/JavaScript games. IJKL, like WASD, are arranged in an ergonomic inverted T shape, and, since they are used by the right hand, adjustment is easy for people who commonly use the arrow keys.

Also, in many games that also use the WASD keys, the IJKL keys are sometimes used as a secondary player control for games that have multiplayer.

Devil May Cry 4 by Capcom utilizes IJKL as the player's action keys (such as Melee Attack, Ranged Attack, Special Attack etc.) as an alternative to mouse-driven actions.

=== IJKM keys ===
Some older computer games, especially those on 8-bit platforms, often had the combination IJKM used as the standard control key combination, which was more logically arranged, if far less ergonomic than an inverted-T. In addition, on the Apple II, special support existed in ROM for Escape mode. At the Applesoft BASIC prompt, using the right and left arrow keys to move the cursor would add/remove characters the cursor passed over to/from the input buffer. Pressing the Esc key entered a mode where pressing the I, J, K or M keys would move the cursor without altering the input buffer. After exiting this mode by pressing Escape again, normal behavior would resume. This made it easy to edit lines of BASIC code by listing them, then re-inputting them with edits interspersed.

=== AZ keys ===
The Apple II and Apple II Plus originally had left and right arrow keys but no up and down arrow keys. Many programs written for these computers used A and Z to substitute for the missing up and down keys. The IJKM combination was also popular on these computers. Another fairly common variant on these machines was the combination of RETURN and / (slash) with the left and right arrows, as those four keys roughly form a diamond on the keyboard; while the right ⇧ Shift key would be in the more natural position for "down", pressing ⇧ Shift alone was not detectable by software on an unmodified Apple II or Apple II plus. All these keys fell somewhat out of favor after the release of the Apple IIe, which had a full set of arrow keys.

Starting with Need for Speed: Carbon, AZ keys were the default keyboard controls for acceleration and braking respectively.

=== HJKL keys ===
ADM-3A keyboard layout

HJKL is a layout used in the Unix computer world, a practice spawned by its use in the vi text editor. The editor was written by Bill Joy for use on a Lear-Siegler ADM-3A terminal, which places arrow symbols on these letters, since it did not have dedicated arrow keys on the keyboard. These correspond to the functions of the corresponding control characters Ctrl+H, Ctrl+J, Ctrl+K, and Ctrl+L when sent to the terminal, moving the cursor left, down, up, and right, respectively. (The Ctrl+H and Ctrl+J functions were standard, but the interpretations of Ctrl+K and Ctrl+L were unique to the ADM-3A.) This key arrangement is often referred to as "vi keys". HJKL keys are still ubiquitous in newly developed Unix software even though today's keyboards have arrow keys. They have the advantage of letting touch-typists move the cursor without taking their fingers off of the home row. Examples of games that use HJKL are the text-based "graphic" adventures like NetHack, the Rogue series, and Linley's Dungeon Crawl. It is also used by some players of the Dance Dance Revolution clone StepMania, where HJKL corresponds directly to the order of the arrows. Gmail, Google Labs' keyboard shortcuts and other websites use J and K for "next" and "previous".

=== SDF-SPACE and ASD-SPACE ===
Another old-style variation that spawned from games like Quake was the SDF-SPACE layout. In this layout, S = turn left, D = forward, F = turn right, space = backpedal, E = strafe left and R = strafe right. This layout allows the player to aim with the mouse while strafing (sidestepping), turning and running or backpedaling all at once creating slightly more complex movements. This variation is not favoured any longer for two main reasons. First, because many players deem the turn commands useless because the mouse can act as a turning device, and so they assign S and F to the sidestep commands and leave the turn commands unassigned. The second, and probably more prominent reason is, in assigning both the turn and strafe commands, performing movements and dodges can be much more confusing, so newcomers tend to not prefer this key setup. Though no longer widely used, many FPS veterans and tournament players still employ this key setup.

This variant adopted to newer games using mouse-look doesn't need the specific turn left and turn right keys. Instead S = strafe left, D = strafe right, A = backpedal, and space or F = forward. This layout keep your fingers rest on the home row. The with the same comfort and usability points from ESDF. Jump is left out of this scheme, because in games like Quake jump was usually bound to MOUSE2. With more alternate fire and aim-down-sights oriented games may have to play with F, SPACE, and MOUSE2 binding are often reassign in according to player preference.

A similar layout is ASD-SPACE. Commonly used in 2D-based fighting games, ASD-SPACE maps A, S, and D to "left", "down", and "right" movement, while the spacebar is used for "up" (jumping). This allows an easier access to "360 degree" motions than a normal inverted-T layout, as well as being more ergonomic than simply placing all directions in a single row (ex. ASDF). There is even a "stickless" arcade controller based around the concept, called the Hitbox.

=== WQSE keys ===
Another, close, variation is the WQSE combination, which follows the belief that the index and ring fingers' natural and more ergonomic positions when the middle finger is on W are Q and E rather than A and D, respectively. This can be attested to by the fact that the arrow keys were partly designed in the inverted-T shape in order to avoid having the side buttons possibly directly underneath other keys. It also has the advantage that there is less distance needed to travel to reach the number keys. For similar reasons, some gamers use the WQSD combination (which is WASD with the A key moved up to Q, or WQSE with the E moved down to D). For players who prefer to keep the keyboard centered on the body, this results in less wrist rotation, as it places the index finger naturally over the D key when the left arm rests down to the left of the keyboard. Another variation is EWDF, which is the same shifted right one key, as in ESDF. SAZD is a slight variation on WQSE and WQSD, in that it is both ergonomic and rotated, but gives the fingers closer proximity to the ⇧ Shift and SPACE keys.

=== QAOP keys ===
QAOP, sometimes called OPQA, dates back to the ZX Spectrum. The O/P keys were used for left/right movement, and the Q/A keys for up/down or forward/backwards movement. With SPACE being located at the bottom right of the original rubber-keyed Spectrum, the M or sometimes N key would be used for fire/action; on later models the SPACE bar would be used.

QAOP had its own variations, such as ZXKM or WELP. Many BBC Micro games used the keys ZX*? respectively for left, right, up, and down (with "*" being the key above and right of "?", where "@" is on modern UK keyboards). In each case, one hand controls left/right, and the other hand controls up/down movement. A further variation is used when two players use the keyboard at the same time; for example, Gauntlet uses the combination 1QSD for Player 1, and 8IKL for Player 2.

=== ESDX keys ===
The ESDX keys (known as the "cursor movement diamond") were used in the WordStar word processor and related applications, in combination with the Control key. These keys were also used, and had arrows printed on them on the TI-99/4A computer.

Car Wars is an example of a 99/4A game that uses ESDX keys.

=== 8426 keys ===
The Model F keyboard that came with the original IBM PC didn't have dedicated arrow keys, and instead used the 8426 keys with Num Lock turned off. Therefore, this was the scheme used by the earliest DOS games.

The numpad or number pad keys are used quite often, but are used mostly in driving simulator games. This is mainly because these games usually have quite a large number of keys needed to control the vehicle properly and the number pad will have plenty of keys for that particular use. Another reason this is commonly used is because left-handed players will find this a more comfortable position than the IJKL keys (see above), and the number pad has fewer keys around it, thus it is less likely the player will hit the wrong key by mistake.

=== WAXD (including QEZC) ===
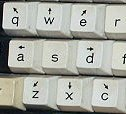
WAXD keycaps of PLATO IV

Another variation is WAXD, using either 4 or 8 keys surrounding the "s" key. Eight directional arrows were printed on the keysets of PLATO terminals developed in the 1960s and 1970s, and many games (including Empire, Dogfight, and more than a dozen dungeon games such as Avatar) utilize this layout. The TUTOR language display editor, character set (bitmap) editor, and line set editor also use these keys on that system and its successors. For ballistic targeting, key combinations (e.g. "we", "de", etc.) are used to get angles in multiples of 22.5 degrees. In many programs, the "s" key is often used to either "select" or "shoot", depending upon the application.

This layout also appears on the numeric keypads of some keyboards, using 8462 (including 7913).

=== Less common variations ===
Vaguely related is the ZXC layout, used in many freeware games, and a common setup for emulation and older 2D gaming using a keyboard.

A few games from the 1980s, such as the Phantasie series, use the "3WES" layout, which forms a diamond on QWERTY keyboards. In this layout, three of the four keys happen to correspond to the compass directions "West", "East" and "South". These games usually assign both "N" and "3" to "North".

AZERTY users will use the "ZQSD" combination instead of "WASD", since those are the keys in place of WASD on a QWERTY keyboard. Depending on the configuration, "QAOP" may either still work or be vertically inverted. On the Dvorak keyboard layout, "WASD" is ",AOE".

Left-handed players may use the numeric keypad instead.

A somewhat uncommon variant is YGHJ which while requiring the keyboard to be turned slightly clockwise, can result in the thumb resting comfortably upon the right Alt key and the little finger resting on C. This can be useful in games that utilize both jump and sprint functions as it allows the fingers to rest on smaller keys than ⇧ Shift and Space. The YGHJ configuration also places the hand closer to the center of the QWERTY section of the keyboard, potentially opening up the entire board to custom keybindings.

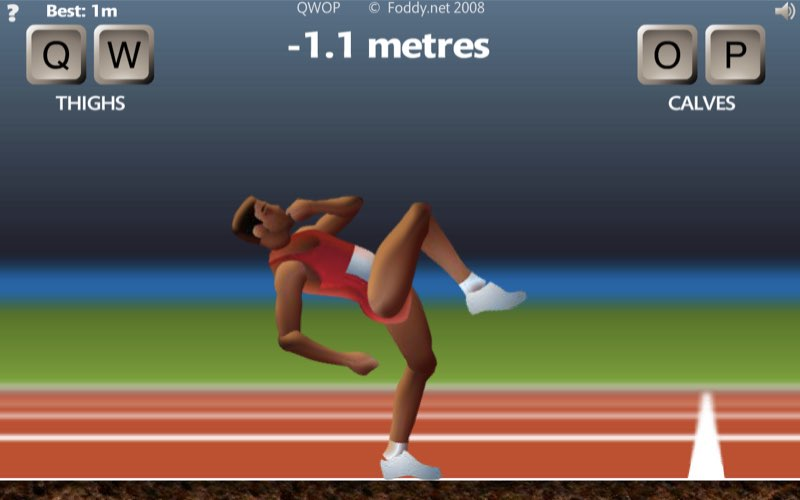
QWOP's title refers to the four keyboard keys used to move the muscles of the sprinter avatar.

The game QWOP uses the control scheme "QWOP" to control the sprinter's arms and legs. the Q and W keys control the sprinter's thighs while the O and P keys control the sprinter's calves making an intentionally difficult control system as a result.

Layouts such as Shift Z Ctrl X, where ⇧ Shift is up and Ctrl is down, allow all direction keys to be used in any combination, without the delay of changing finger position. But the use of modifier keys can be problematic, as some games do not allow mapping of these keys.

Professional Counter Strike: Global Offensive player Fashr is known to use somewhat unorthodox keybindings. Using the right mouse button to move forward, semicolon to move backwards, comma for strafing left and the full stop to strafe right.

== See also ==
- Arrow (symbol)
  - ← ↓ ↑ →
- D-pad
- Pointing stick
- QWERTY
- Scroll Lock
