= Supplemental Arrows-B =

- Range: U+2900..U+297F (128 code points)
- Plane: BMP
- Scripts: Common
- Assigned: 128 code points
- Unused: 0 reserved code points

Unicode version history
- 3.2 (2002): 128 (+128)

Unicode documentation
- Code chart ∣ Web page

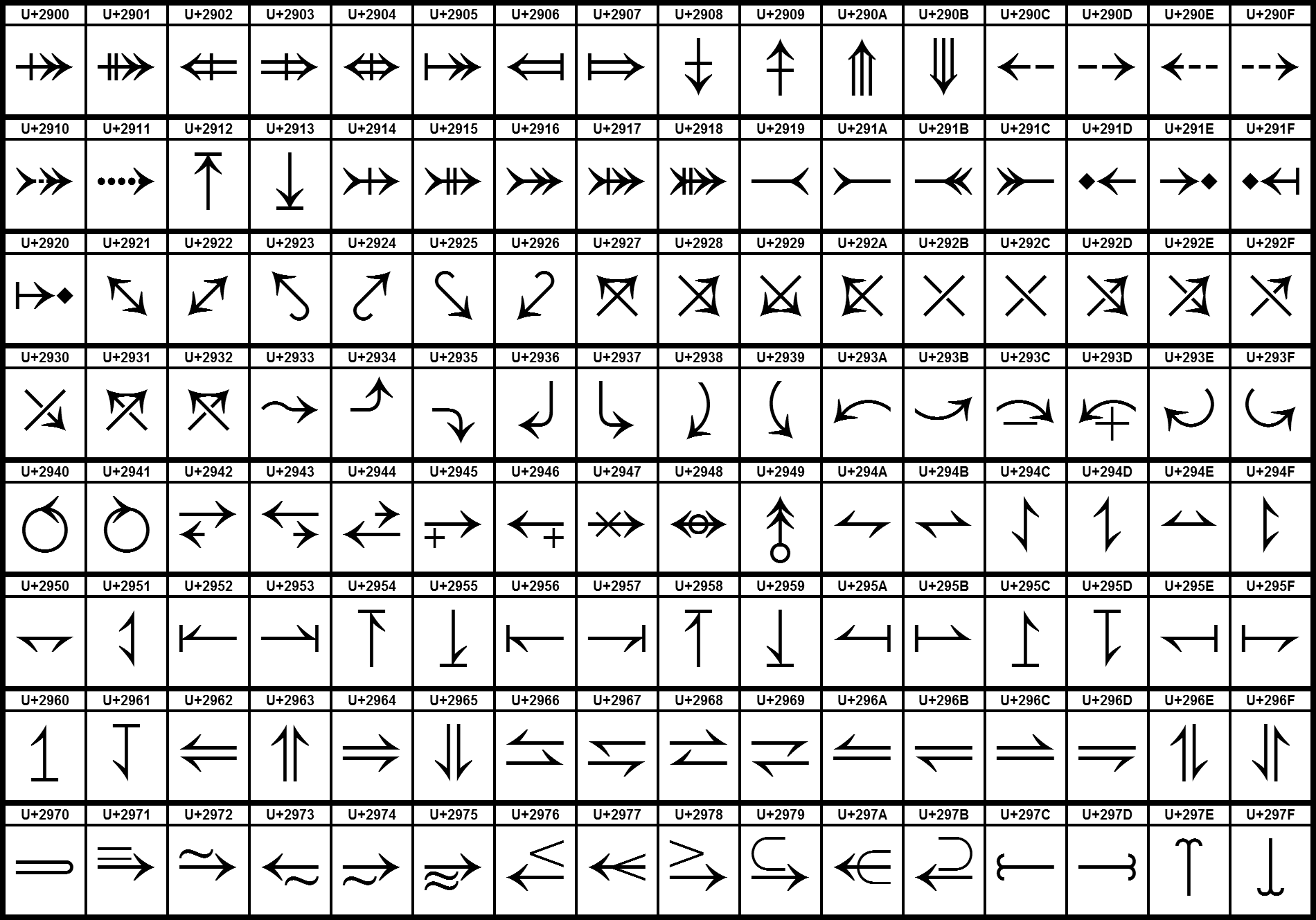
Graphical representation of the Supplemental Arrows-B Unicode block

Supplemental Arrows-B is a Unicode block containing miscellaneous arrows, arrow tails, crossing arrows used in knot descriptions, curved arrows, and harpoons.

== Block ==
Supplemental Arrows-B^{[1]} Official Unicode Consortium code chart (PDF)
	0	1	2	3	4	5	6	7	8	9	A	B	C	D	E	F
U+290x	⤀	⤁	⤂	⤃	⤄	⤅	⤆	⤇	⤈	⤉	⤊	⤋	⤌	⤍	⤎	⤏
U+291x	⤐	⤑	⤒	⤓	⤔	⤕	⤖	⤗	⤘	⤙	⤚	⤛	⤜	⤝	⤞	⤟
U+292x	⤠	⤡	⤢	⤣	⤤	⤥	⤦	⤧	⤨	⤩	⤪	⤫	⤬	⤭	⤮	⤯
U+293x	⤰	⤱	⤲	⤳	⤴	⤵	⤶	⤷	⤸	⤹	⤺	⤻	⤼	⤽	⤾	⤿
U+294x	⥀	⥁	⥂	⥃	⥄	⥅	⥆	⥇	⥈	⥉	⥊	⥋	⥌	⥍	⥎	⥏
U+295x	⥐	⥑	⥒	⥓	⥔	⥕	⥖	⥗	⥘	⥙	⥚	⥛	⥜	⥝	⥞	⥟
U+296x	⥠	⥡	⥢	⥣	⥤	⥥	⥦	⥧	⥨	⥩	⥪	⥫	⥬	⥭	⥮	⥯
U+297x	⥰	⥱	⥲	⥳	⥴	⥵	⥶	⥷	⥸	⥹	⥺	⥻	⥼	⥽	⥾	⥿
Notes: 1. As of Unicode version 17.0

== Emoji ==
The Supplemental Arrows-B block contains two emoji: U+2934–U+2935.

The block has four standardized variants defined to specify emoji-style (U+FE0F VS16) or text presentation (U+FE0E VS15) for the two emoji, both of which default to a text presentation.

Emoji variation sequences
U+	2934	2935
base code point	⤴	⤵
base+VS15 (text)	⤴︎	⤵︎
base+VS16 (emoji)	⤴️	⤵️

== History ==
The following Unicode-related documents record the purpose and process of defining specific characters in the Supplemental Arrows-B block:

Version	Final code points (Note: Proposed code points and characters names may differ from final code points and names)	Count	L2 ID	WG2 ID	Document
3.2	U+2900..297F	128	L2/99-238		Consolidated document containing 6 Japanese proposals, 1999-07-15
3.2	U+2900..297F	128		N2094	Addition of thirteen linguistic educational characters, 1999-09-13
3.2	U+2900..297F	128	L2/99-365		Moore, Lisa (1999-11-23), Comments on JCS Proposals
3.2	U+2900..297F	128	L2/00-010	N2103	Umamaheswaran, V. S. (2000-01-05), "8.8", Minutes of WG 2 meeting 37, Copenhagen, Denmark: 1999-09-13—16
3.2	U+2900..297F	128	L2/00-024		Shibano, Kohji (2000-01-31), JCS proposal revised
3.2	U+2900..297F	128	L2/99-260R		Moore, Lisa (2000-02-07), "JCS Proposals", Minutes of the UTC/L2 meeting in Mission Viejo, October 26-28, 1999
3.2	U+2900..297F	128	L2/00-119 (Note: Refer to the history section of the Miscellaneous Mathematical Symbols-B block for additional math-related documents)	N2191R	Whistler, Ken; Freytag, Asmus (2000-04-19), Encoding Additional Mathematical Symbols in Unicode
3.2	U+2900..297F	128	L2/00-234	N2203 (rtf, txt)	Umamaheswaran, V. S. (2000-07-21), "8.18", Minutes from the SC2/WG2 meeting in Beijing, 2000-03-21 -- 24
3.2	U+2900..297F	128	L2/00-115R2		Moore, Lisa (2000-08-08), "Motion 83-M11", Minutes Of UTC Meeting #83
3.2	U+2900..297F	128	L2/00-298	N2258	Sato, T. K. (2000-09-04), JIS X 0213 symbols part-2
3.2	U+2900..297F	128	L2/00-342	N2278	Sato, T. K.; Everson, Michael; Whistler, Ken; Freytag, Asmus (2000-09-20), Ad hoc Report on Japan feedback N2257 and N2258
3.2	U+2900..297F	128	L2/01-050	N2253	Umamaheswaran, V. S. (2001-01-21), "7.16 JIS X0213 Symbols", Minutes of the SC2/WG2 meeting in Athens, September 2000
3.2	U+2900..297F	128	L2/01-012R		Moore, Lisa (2001-05-21), "Motion 86-M19", Minutes UTC #86 in Mountain View, Jan 2001
3.2	U+2900..297F	128	L2/11-438 (Note: See also L2/10-458, L2/11-414, L2/11-415, and L2/11-429) (Note: Refer to the history section of the Miscellaneous Symbols and Pictographs block for additional emoji-related documents)	N4182	Edberg, Peter (2011-12-22), Emoji Variation Sequences (Revision of L2/11-429)

== See also ==
- Unicode symbols
- Mathematical operators and symbols in Unicode
