= Tiny and miny =

Operators in combinatorial game theory

In combinatorial game theory, a branch of mathematics studying two-player games of perfect information in extensive form, tiny and miny are operators that transform one game into another. When applied to a number (represented as a game according to the mathematics of surreal numbers) they yield infinitesimal values.

For any game or number G, tiny G (denoted by ⧾_{G} in many texts) is the game {0|{0|-G}}, using the bracket notation for combinatorial games in which the left side of the vertical bar lists the game positions that the left player may move to, and the right side of the bar lists the positions that the right player can move to. In this case, this means that left can end the game immediately, or on the second move, but right can reach position G if allowed to move twice in a row. This is generally applied when the value of G is positive (representing an advantage to right); tiny G is better than nothing for right, but far less advantageous. Symmetrically, miny G (analogously denoted ⧿_{G}) is tiny G's negative, or {{G|0}|0}.

Tiny and miny aren't just abstract mathematical operators on combinatorial games: tiny and miny games do occur "naturally" in such games as toppling dominoes. Specifically, tiny n, where n is a natural number, can be generated by placing two black dominoes outside n + 2 white dominoes.

Tiny games and up have certain curious relational characteristics. Specifically, though ⧾_{G} is infinitesimal with respect to ↑ for all positive values of x, ⧾⧾⧾_{G} is equal to up. Expansion of ⧾⧾⧾_{G} into its canonical form yields {0|{{0|{{0|{0|-G}}|0}}|0}}. While the expression appears daunting, some careful and persistent expansion of the game tree of ⧾⧾⧾_{G} + ↓ will show that it is a second player win, and that, consequently, ⧾⧾⧾_{G} = ↑. Similarly curious, mathematician John Horton Conway noted, calling it "amusing," that "↑ is the unique solution of ⧾_{G} = G." Conway's assertion is also easily verifiable with canonical forms and game trees.

== Unicode ==
- U+2191 ↑ UPWARDS ARROW
- U+2193 ↓ DOWNWARDS ARROW
- U+29FE ⧾ TINY (pronounced "tee-nie", /tiːniː/)
- U+29FF ⧿ MINY (pronounced "mee-nie", /miːniː/)
