= Maps to =

Mathematical symbol to denote a function

↦o

Maps to
- U+21A6 ↦ RIGHTWARDS ARROW FROM BAR

The maps to symbol, ↦, is a rightward arrow protruding from a vertical bar. It is used in mathematics and in computer science to denote functions.

- In Z notation, a specification language used in software development, this symbol is called the maplet arrow and the expression x ↦ y is called a maplet.
- In separation logic it denotes the contents of a specific cell of memory.

In the Unicode character set, the symbol is code point U+21A6.

== Other uses ==
The "Maps to" operator is useful when it is desirable to avoid assigning names to functions.

This can avoid possible misinterpretations due to poor naming conventions, such as avoiding the following name conflict from these two functions existing in the same file or in the same mathematical proof:

- func sqr: $x \mapsto x*x$
  - Squares the input value
- func sqr: $x \mapsto (2*x)+(2*x)$.
  - Calculates the perimeter of a square when given an input side length.

== See also ==
- Arrow notation – e.g., $x\mapsto x+1$, also known as map
