= Supplemental Arrows-C =

- Range: U+1F800..U+1F8FF (256 code points)
- Plane: SMP
- Scripts: Common
- Symbol sets: Stylistic arrows
- Assigned: 171 code points
- Unused: 85 reserved code points

Unicode version history
- 7.0 (2014): 148 (+148)
- 13.0 (2020): 150 (+2)
- 16.0 (2024): 162 (+12)
- 17.0 (2025): 171 (+9)

Unicode documentation
- Code chart ∣ Web page

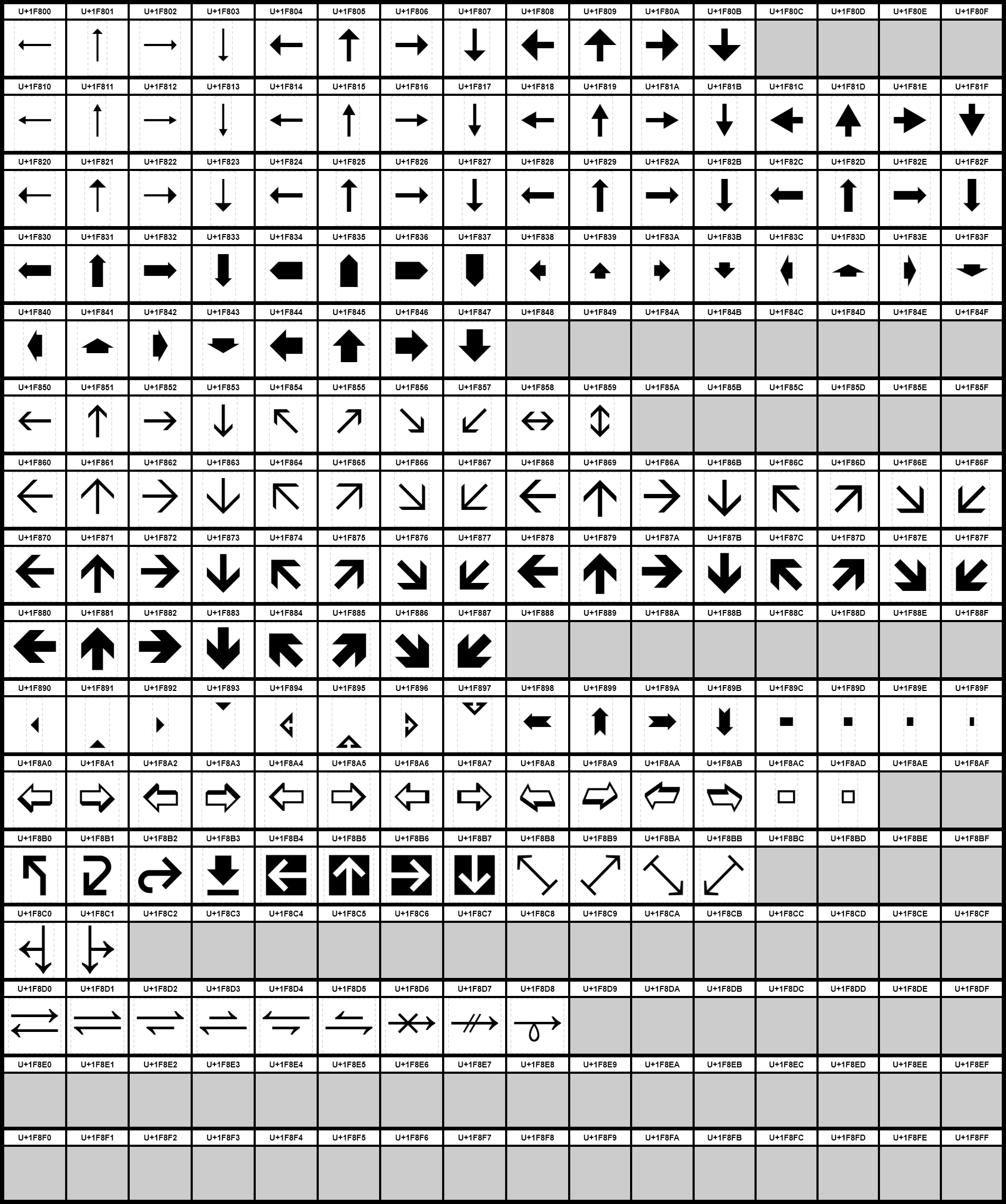
Graphical representation of the Supplemental Arrows-C Unicode block

Supplemental Arrows-C is a Unicode block containing stylistic variants, weights, and fills of standard directional arrows.

== Block ==
Supplemental Arrows-C^{[1]}^{[2]} Official Unicode Consortium code chart (PDF)
	0	1	2	3	4	5	6	7	8	9	A	B	C	D	E	F
U+1F80x	🠀	🠁	🠂	🠃	🠄	🠅	🠆	🠇	🠈	🠉	🠊	🠋				
U+1F81x	🠐	🠑	🠒	🠓	🠔	🠕	🠖	🠗	🠘	🠙	🠚	🠛	🠜	🠝	🠞	🠟
U+1F82x	🠠	🠡	🠢	🠣	🠤	🠥	🠦	🠧	🠨	🠩	🠪	🠫	🠬	🠭	🠮	🠯
U+1F83x	🠰	🠱	🠲	🠳	🠴	🠵	🠶	🠷	🠸	🠹	🠺	🠻	🠼	🠽	🠾	🠿
U+1F84x	🡀	🡁	🡂	🡃	🡄	🡅	🡆	🡇								
U+1F85x	🡐	🡑	🡒	🡓	🡔	🡕	🡖	🡗	🡘	🡙						
U+1F86x	🡠	🡡	🡢	🡣	🡤	🡥	🡦	🡧	🡨	🡩	🡪	🡫	🡬	🡭	🡮	🡯
U+1F87x	🡰	🡱	🡲	🡳	🡴	🡵	🡶	🡷	🡸	🡹	🡺	🡻	🡼	🡽	🡾	🡿
U+1F88x	🢀	🢁	🢂	🢃	🢄	🢅	🢆	🢇								
U+1F89x	🢐	🢑	🢒	🢓	🢔	🢕	🢖	🢗	🢘	🢙	🢚	🢛	🢜	🢝	🢞	🢟
U+1F8Ax	🢠	🢡	🢢	🢣	🢤	🢥	🢦	🢧	🢨	🢩	🢪	🢫	🢬	🢭		
U+1F8Bx	🢰	🢱	🢲	🢳	🢴	🢵	🢶	🢷	🢸	🢹	🢺	🢻				
U+1F8Cx	🣀	🣁														
U+1F8Dx	🣐	🣑	🣒	🣓	🣔	🣕	🣖	🣗	🣘							
U+1F8Ex																
U+1F8Fx																
Notes 1.As of Unicode version 17.0 2.Grey areas indicate non-assigned code points

== History ==
The following Unicode-related documents record the purpose and process of defining specific characters in the Supplemental Arrows-C block:

Version	Final code points (Note: Proposed code points and characters names may differ from final code points and names)	Count	L2 ID	WG2 ID	Document
7.0	U+1F800..1F80B, 1F810..1F847, 1F850..1F859, 1F860..1F887, 1F890..1F8AD	148	L2/11-052R		Suignard, Michel (2011-02-15), Wingdings and Webdings symbols - Preliminary study
7.0	U+1F800..1F80B, 1F810..1F847, 1F850..1F859, 1F860..1F887, 1F890..1F8AD	148	L2/11-149		Suignard, Michel (2011-05-09), Proposal to add Wingdings and Webdings symbols
7.0	U+1F800..1F80B, 1F810..1F847, 1F850..1F859, 1F860..1F887, 1F890..1F8AD	148	L2/11-196	N4022	Suignard, Michel (2011-05-21), Revised Wingdings proposal
7.0	U+1F800..1F80B, 1F810..1F847, 1F850..1F859, 1F860..1F887, 1F890..1F8AD	148	L2/11-247	N4115	Suignard, Michel (2011-06-08), Proposal to add Wingdings and Webdings Symbols
7.0	U+1F800..1F80B, 1F810..1F847, 1F850..1F859, 1F860..1F887, 1F890..1F8AD	148	L2/11-344	N4143	Suignard, Michel (2011-09-28), Updated proposal to add Wingdings and Webdings Symbols
7.0	U+1F800..1F80B, 1F810..1F847, 1F850..1F859, 1F860..1F887, 1F890..1F8AD	148		N4103	"10.2.1 Wingdings/Webdings additions", Unconfirmed minutes of WG 2 meeting 58, 2012-01-03
7.0	U+1F800..1F80B, 1F810..1F847, 1F850..1F859, 1F860..1F887, 1F890..1F8AD	148	L2/12-130	N4239	Suignard, Michel (2012-05-08), Disposition of comments on SC2 N 4201 (PDAM text for Amendment 1.2 to ISO/IEC 10646 3rd edition)
7.0	U+1F800..1F80B, 1F810..1F847, 1F850..1F859, 1F860..1F887, 1F890..1F8AD	148		N4363	Suignard, Michel (2012-10-13), Status of encoding of Wingdings and Webdings Symbols
7.0	U+1F800..1F80B, 1F810..1F847, 1F850..1F859, 1F860..1F887, 1F890..1F8AD	148	L2/12-368	N4384	Suignard, Michel (2012-11-06), Status of encoding of Wingdings and Webdings Symbols
7.0	U+1F800..1F80B, 1F810..1F847, 1F850..1F859, 1F860..1F887, 1F890..1F8AD	148	L2/12-086	N4223	Requests regarding the Wingdings/Webdings characters in ISO/IEC 10646 PDAM 1.2, 2012-12-27
13.0	U+1F8B0..1F8B1	2	L2/17-435R		Ewell, Doug; Bettencourt, Rebecca; Everson, Michael; Silva, Eduardo Marín; Mårtenson, Elias; Shoulson, Mark; Steele, Shawn; Turner, Rebecca (2018-04-23), Proposal to add characters from legacy computers and teletext to the UCS
13.0	U+1F8B0..1F8B1	2	L2/18-039		Anderson, Deborah; Whistler, Ken; Pournader, Roozbeh; Moore, Lisa; Liang, Hai; Cook, Richard (2018-01-19), "26", Recommendations to UTC #154 January 2018 on Script Proposals
13.0	U+1F8B0..1F8B1	2	L2/18-235 (full, no_attach, sources, mappings_zip)		Ewell, Doug; Bettencourt, Rebecca; Bánffy, Ricardo; Everson, Michael; Silva, Eduardo Marín; Mårtenson, Elias; Shoulson, Mark; Steele, Shawn; Turner, Rebecca (2018-07-20), Proposal to add characters from legacy computers and teletext to the UCS
13.0	U+1F8B0..1F8B1	2	L2/18-241		Anderson, Deborah; et al. (2018-07-20), "19", Recommendations to UTC # 156 July 2018 on Script Proposals
13.0	U+1F8B0..1F8B1	2	L2/18-275R (full, no_attach, sources, mappings_zip)		Ewell, Doug; Bettencourt, Rebecca; Bánffy, Ricardo; Everson, Michael; Silva, Eduardo Marín; Mårtenson, Elias; Shoulson, Mark; Steele, Shawn; Turner, Rebecca (2018-09-06), Proposal to add characters from legacy computers and teletext to the UCS
13.0	U+1F8B0..1F8B1	2	L2/18-300		Anderson, Deborah; et al. (2018-09-14), "11", Recommendations to UTC #157 on Script Proposals
13.0	U+1F8B0..1F8B1	2	L2/19-025 (full, no_attach, sources, mappings_zip)	N5028	Ewell, Doug; Bettencourt, Rebecca; Bánffy, Ricardo; Everson, Michael; Silva, Eduardo Marín; Mårtenson, Elias; Shoulson, Mark; Steele, Shawn; Turner, Rebecca (2019-01-04), Proposal to add characters from legacy computers and teletext to the UCS
13.0	U+1F8B0..1F8B1	2	L2/19-047		Anderson, Deborah; et al. (2019-01-13), "24", Recommendations to UTC #158 January 2019 on Script Proposals
13.0	U+1F8B0..1F8B1	2	L2/19-008		Moore, Lisa (2019-02-08), "E.2", UTC #158 Minutes
16.0	U+1F8B2	1	L2/21-234 (full, no_attach, sources, mappings_zip)		Bettencourt, Rebecca; Ewell, Doug; Bánffy, Ricardo; Everson, Michael; Hietaniemi, Jarkko; Silva, Eduardo Marín; Mårtenson, Elias; Shoulson, Mark; Steele, Shawn; Turner, Rebecca (2021-12-20), Proposal to add characters from Smalltalk to the UCS
16.0	U+1F8B2	1	L2/22-023		Anderson, Deborah; Whistler, Ken; Pournader, Roozbeh; Constable, Peter (2022-01-22), "20 Smalltalk", Recommendations to UTC #170 January 2022 on Script Proposals
16.0	U+1F8B2	1	L2/22-016		Constable, Peter (2022-04-21), "Consensus 170-C17", UTC #170 Minutes, "UTC accepts ... 5 Smalltalk symbols"
16.0	U+1F8B3..1F8BB	9	L2/21-235 (full, no_attach, sources, mappings_zip)		Bettencourt, Rebecca; Ewell, Doug; Bánffy, Ricardo; Everson, Michael; Hietaniemi, Jarkko; Silva, Eduardo Marín; Mårtenson, Elias; Shoulson, Mark; Steele, Shawn; Turner, Rebecca (2021-12-20), Proposal to add further characters from legacy computers and teletext to the UCS
16.0	U+1F8B3..1F8BB	9	L2/22-023		Anderson, Deborah; Whistler, Ken; Pournader, Roozbeh; Constable, Peter (2022-01-22), "17 Legacy Computing Symbols", Recommendations to UTC #170 January 2022 on Script Proposals
16.0	U+1F8B3..1F8BB	9	L2/21-235R (full, no_attach)		Bettencourt, Rebecca; Ewell, Doug; Bánffy, Ricardo; Everson, Michael; Hietaniemi, Jarkko; Silva, Eduardo Marín; Mårtenson, Elias; Shoulson, Mark; Steele, Shawn; Turner, Rebecca (2022-01-26), Proposal to add further characters from legacy computers and teletext to the UCS
16.0	U+1F8B3..1F8BB	9	L2/22-016		Constable, Peter (2022-04-21), "D.1 17 Legacy Computing Symbols", UTC #170 Minutes
16.0	U+1F8C0..1F8C1	2	L2/23-185	N5239	Suignard, Michel (2023-07-27), Encoding proposal for two arrow symbols used in Egyptology
16.0	U+1F8C0..1F8C1	2	L2/23-164		Anderson, Deborah; Kučera, Jan; Whistler, Ken; Pournader, Roozbeh; Constable, Peter (2023-07-21), "9 Symbol: Two Arrows (for Egyptology)", Recommendations to UTC #176 July 2023 on Script Proposals
16.0	U+1F8C0..1F8C1	2	L2/23-157		Constable, Peter (2023-07-31), "Consensus 176-C36", UTC #176 Minutes, "Provisionally assign U+1F8C0 LEFTWARDS ARROW FROM DOWNWARDS ARROW and U+1F8C1 RIGHTWARDS ARROW FROM DOWNWARDS ARROW"
16.0	U+1F8C0..1F8C1	2	L2/23-238R		Anderson, Deborah; Kučera, Jan; Whistler, Ken; Pournader, Roozbeh; Constable, Peter (2023-11-01), "16 Symbols: Arrows (for Egyptology)", Recommendations to UTC #177 November 2023 on Script Proposals
16.0	U+1F8C0..1F8C1	2	L2/23-231		Constable, Peter (2023-12-08), "Consensus 177-C37", UTC #177 Minutes, "Add the 2 provisionally assigned characters U+1F8C0 LEFTWARDS ARROW FROM DOWNWARDS ARROW and U+1F8C1 RIGHTWARDS ARROW FROM DOWNWARDS ARROW"
17.0	U+1F8D0..1F8D8	9	L2/23-193		Soiffer, Neil; Sargent, Murray; Freytag, Asmus (2023-07-20), Five symbols used in chemistry
17.0	U+1F8D0..1F8D8	9	L2/23-193R		Soiffer, Neil; Sargent, Murray; Freytag, Asmus (2023-07-26), Proposal for Ten Chemical Symbols
17.0	U+1F8D0..1F8D8	9	L2/23-193R2		Soiffer, Neil; Sargent, Murray; Freytag, Asmus (2023-10-20), Proposal for Ten Chemical Symbols
17.0	U+1F8D0..1F8D8	9	L2/23-238R		Anderson, Deborah; Kučera, Jan; Whistler, Ken; Pournader, Roozbeh; Constable, Peter (2023-11-01), "12 Symbols", Recommendations to UTC #177 November 2023 on Script Proposals
17.0	U+1F8D0..1F8D8	9	L2/23-231		Constable, Peter (2023-12-08), "Consensus 177-C33", UTC #177 Minutes
17.0	U+1F8D0..1F8D8	9	L2/24-006		Constable, Peter (2024-01-31), "Consensus 178-C1", UTC #178 Minutes
