= Miscellaneous Mathematical Symbols-B =

- Range: U+2980..U+29FF (128 code points)
- Plane: BMP
- Scripts: Common
- Assigned: 128 code points
- Unused: 0 reserved code points

Unicode version history
- 3.2 (2002): 128 (+128)

Unicode documentation
- Code chart ∣ Web page

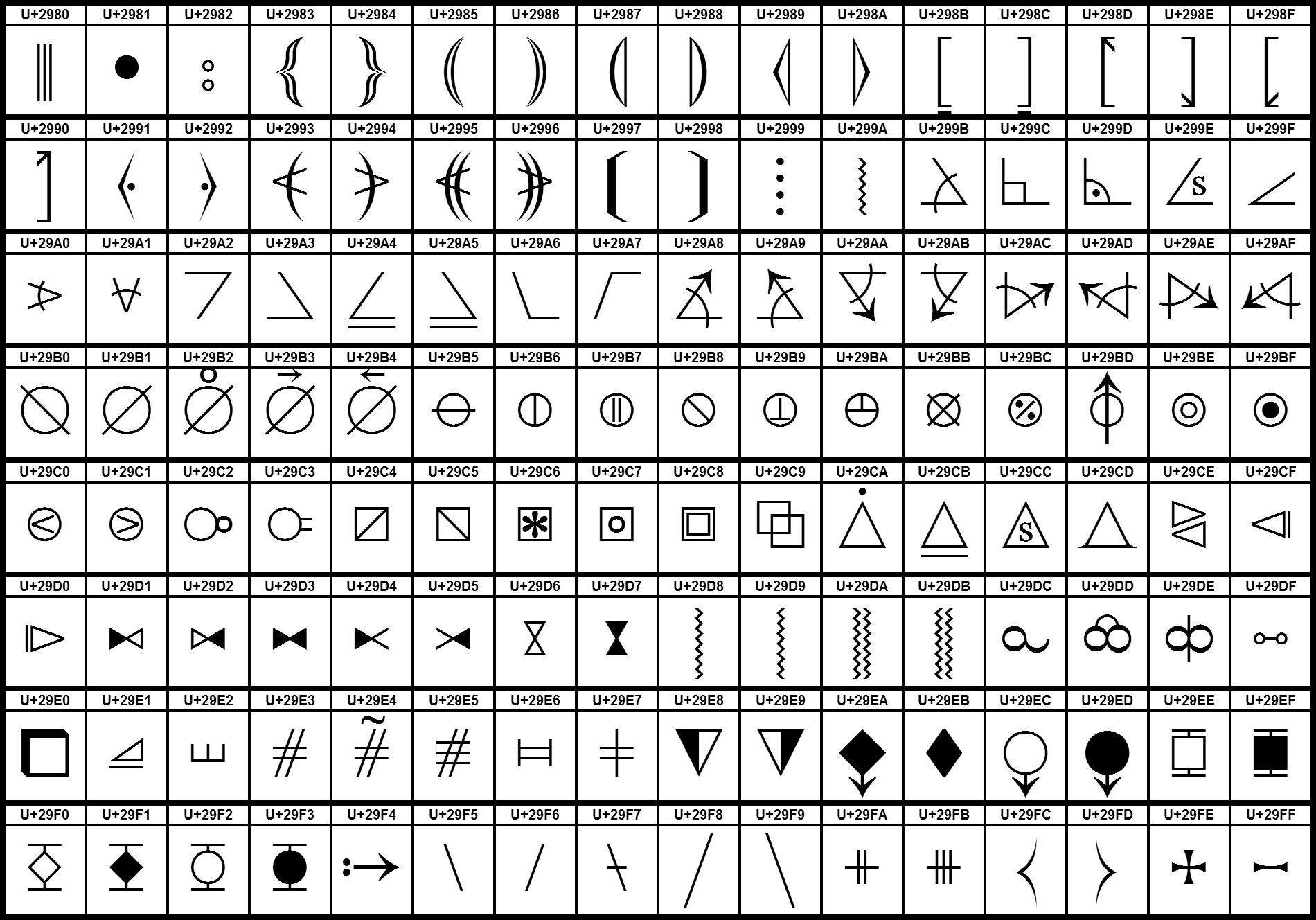
Graphical representation of the Miscellaneous Mathematical Symbols-B Unicode block

Miscellaneous Mathematical Symbols-B is a Unicode block containing miscellaneous mathematical symbols, including brackets, angles, and circle symbols.

== Block ==
Miscellaneous Mathematical Symbols-B^{[1]} Official Unicode Consortium code chart (PDF)
	0	1	2	3	4	5	6	7	8	9	A	B	C	D	E	F
U+298x	⦀	⦁	⦂	⦃	⦄	⦅	⦆	⦇	⦈	⦉	⦊	⦋	⦌	⦍	⦎	⦏
U+299x	⦐	⦑	⦒	⦓	⦔	⦕	⦖	⦗	⦘	⦙	⦚	⦛	⦜	⦝	⦞	⦟
U+29Ax	⦠	⦡	⦢	⦣	⦤	⦥	⦦	⦧	⦨	⦩	⦪	⦫	⦬	⦭	⦮	⦯
U+29Bx	⦰	⦱	⦲	⦳	⦴	⦵	⦶	⦷	⦸	⦹	⦺	⦻	⦼	⦽	⦾	⦿
U+29Cx	⧀	⧁	⧂	⧃	⧄	⧅	⧆	⧇	⧈	⧉	⧊	⧋	⧌	⧍	⧎	⧏
U+29Dx	⧐	⧑	⧒	⧓	⧔	⧕	⧖	⧗	⧘	⧙	⧚	⧛	⧜	⧝	⧞	⧟
U+29Ex	⧠	⧡	⧢	⧣	⧤	⧥	⧦	⧧	⧨	⧩	⧪	⧫	⧬	⧭	⧮	⧯
U+29Fx	⧰	⧱	⧲	⧳	⧴	⧵	⧶	⧷	⧸	⧹	⧺	⧻	⧼	⧽	⧾	⧿
Notes: 1. As of Unicode version 17.0

== Variant ==
The Miscellaneous Mathematical Symbols-B block has one variation sequence defined for a standardized variant. Variation selector-1 (VS1) (U+FE00) can be used with U+29B7 ⦷ CIRCLED PARALLEL to request a glyph where the parallel lines touch the circle.

== Usage ==
Some of these symbols are used in Z notation. Specifically

- U+2981 ⦁ Z NOTATION SPOT
- U+2982 ⦂ Z NOTATION TYPE COLON
- U+2987 ⦇ Z NOTATION LEFT IMAGE BRACKET
- U+2988 ⦈ Z NOTATION RIGHT IMAGE BRACKET
- U+2989 ⦉ Z NOTATION LEFT BINDING BRACKET
- U+298A ⦊ Z NOTATION RIGHT BINDING BRACKET

The last two symbols are used in combinatorial game theory

- U+29FE ⧾ TINY
- U+29FF ⧿ MINY

== History ==
The following Unicode-related documents record the purpose and process of defining specific characters in the Miscellaneous Mathematical Symbols-B block:

Version	Final code points (Note: Proposed code points and characters names may differ from final code points and names)	Count	L2 ID	WG2 ID	Document
3.2	U+2980..2996, 2999..29D7, 29DC..29E5, 29E7..29FB	117	L2/98-405		Beeton, Barbara; Ion, Patrick (1998-12-01), Proposal to encode additional mathematical and technical symbols in ISO/IEC 10646
3.2	U+2980..2996, 2999..29D7, 29DC..29E5, 29E7..29FB	117	L2/98-406		Sargent, Murray (1998-12-01), Proposal to encode mathematical variant tags
3.2	U+2980..2996, 2999..29D7, 29DC..29E5, 29E7..29FB	117	L2/98-419 (pdf, doc)		Aliprand, Joan (1999-02-05), "Mathematical Symbols", Approved Minutes -- UTC #78 & NCITS Subgroup L2 # 175 Joint Meeting, San Jose, CA -- December 1-4, 1998
3.2	U+2980..2996, 2999..29D7, 29DC..29E5, 29E7..29FB	117	L2/99-160		Beeton, Barbara (1999-06-01), Proposal to encode mathematical variant tags
3.2	U+2980..2996, 2999..29D7, 29DC..29E5, 29E7..29FB	117	L2/99-238		Consolidated document containing 6 Japanese proposals, 1999-07-15
3.2	U+2980..2996, 2999..29D7, 29DC..29E5, 29E7..29FB	117		N2093	Addition of medical symbols and enclosed numbers, 1999-09-13
3.2	U+2980..2996, 2999..29D7, 29DC..29E5, 29E7..29FB	117	L2/00-010	N2103	Umamaheswaran, V. S. (2000-01-05), "8.8", Minutes of WG 2 meeting 37, Copenhagen, Denmark: 1999-09-13—16
3.2	U+2980..2996, 2999..29D7, 29DC..29E5, 29E7..29FB	117	L2/00-002		Beeton, Barbara (2000-01-09), Request for assignment of codes to mathematical and technical symbols that do not appear in Unicode 2.0 or ISO/IEC 10646
3.2	U+2980..2996, 2999..29D7, 29DC..29E5, 29E7..29FB	117	L2/00-024		Shibano, Kohji (2000-01-31), JCS proposal revised
3.2	U+2980..2996, 2999..29D7, 29DC..29E5, 29E7..29FB	117	L2/00-005R2		Moore, Lisa (2000-02-14), "Motion 82-M4", Minutes of UTC #82 in San Jose
3.2	U+2980..2996, 2999..29D7, 29DC..29E5, 29E7..29FB	117	L2/00-094	N2191	Proposal for Encoding Additional Mathematical Symbols in the BMP, 2000-03-14
3.2	U+2980..2996, 2999..29D7, 29DC..29E5, 29E7..29FB	117	L2/00-098, L2/00-098-page5	N2195	Rationale for non-Kanji characters proposed by JCS committee, 2000-03-15
3.2	U+2980..2996, 2999..29D7, 29DC..29E5, 29E7..29FB	117	L2/00-119	N2191R	Whistler, Ken; Freytag, Asmus (2000-04-19), Encoding Additional Mathematical Symbols in Unicode
3.2	U+2980..2996, 2999..29D7, 29DC..29E5, 29E7..29FB	117	L2/00-234	N2203 (rtf, txt)	Umamaheswaran, V. S. (2000-07-21), "8.18, 8.20", Minutes from the SC2/WG2 meeting in Beijing, 2000-03-21 -- 24
3.2	U+2980..2996, 2999..29D7, 29DC..29E5, 29E7..29FB	117	L2/00-115R2		Moore, Lisa (2000-08-08), "Motion 83-M3, 83-M11, and 83-M21", Minutes Of UTC Meeting #83
3.2	U+2980..2996, 2999..29D7, 29DC..29E5, 29E7..29FB	117	L2/00-298	N2258	Sato, T. K. (2000-09-04), JIS X 0213 symbols part-2
3.2	U+2980..2996, 2999..29D7, 29DC..29E5, 29E7..29FB	117	L2/00-342	N2278	Sato, T. K.; Everson, Michael; Whistler, Ken; Freytag, Asmus (2000-09-20), Ad hoc Report on Japan feedback N2257 and N2258
3.2	U+2980..2996, 2999..29D7, 29DC..29E5, 29E7..29FB	117	L2/01-050	N2253	Umamaheswaran, V. S. (2001-01-21), "7.16 JIS X0213 Symbols", Minutes of the SC2/WG2 meeting in Athens, September 2000
3.2	U+2980..2996, 2999..29D7, 29DC..29E5, 29E7..29FB	117	L2/01-114	N2328	Summary of Voting on SC 2 N 3503, ISO/IEC 10646-1: 2000/PDAM 1, 2001-03-09
3.2	U+2980..2996, 2999..29D7, 29DC..29E5, 29E7..29FB	117	L2/01-147 (pdf, html)	N2343	Everson, Michael (2001-04-03), Encoding of Long Arrows
3.2	U+2980..2996, 2999..29D7, 29DC..29E5, 29E7..29FB	117	L2/01-012R		Moore, Lisa (2001-05-21), "Motion 86-M19", Minutes UTC #86 in Mountain View, Jan 2001
3.2	U+2980..2996, 2999..29D7, 29DC..29E5, 29E7..29FB	117	L2/01-317		Suignard, Michel (2001-08-14), Bracket Disunification & Normalization
3.2	U+2980..2996, 2999..29D7, 29DC..29E5, 29E7..29FB	117	L2/01-342		Suignard, Michel (2001-09-10), "T.9 B.1 List of combining characters/Variation selectors", Comments accompanying the US positive vote on the FPDAM 1 to ISO/IEC 10646-1:2001
3.2	U+2980..2996, 2999..29D7, 29DC..29E5, 29E7..29FB	117	L2/01-386R	N2389R	Suignard, Michel (2001-10-26), "Ireland: Negative", Disposition of comments on SC2 N 3530 (FPDAM text for Amendment 1 to ISO/IEC 10646-1:2000) - revised version
3.2	U+2980..2996, 2999..29D7, 29DC..29E5, 29E7..29FB	117	L2/13-145	N4434	Suignard, Michel (2013-07-18), Math characters and variation sequences
3.2	U+2980..2996, 2999..29D7, 29DC..29E5, 29E7..29FB	117		N4403 (pdf, doc)	Umamaheswaran, V. S. (2014-01-28), "11.1.1 Math characters and variation sequences", Unconfirmed minutes of WG 2 meeting 61, Holiday Inn, Vilnius, Lithuania; 2013-06-10/14
3.2	U+2980..2996, 2999..29D7, 29DC..29E5, 29E7..29FB	117	L2/25-126	N5330	Mayer, Uwe; et al. (2025-03-24), Proposal to encode 17 geometric shapes [Affects U+29B7]
3.2	U+2980..2996, 2999..29D7, 29DC..29E5, 29E7..29FB	117	L2/25-187		Kučera, Jan; Anderson, Deborah; Pournader, Roozbeh; Constable, Peter; Goregaokar, Manish; Leroy, Robin (2025-07-18), "2.3 [Affects U+29B7]", Recommendations to UTC #184 (July 2025) on Script Proposals
3.2	U+2980..2996, 2999..29D7, 29DC..29E5, 29E7..29FB	117	L2/25-181		Leroy, Robin (2025-08-07), "Consensus 184-C42 [Affects U+29B7]", UTC #184 Minutes, "UTC accepts the variation sequence 29B7 FE00 for Unicode 17.0"
3.2	U+2997..2998, 29D8..29DB, 29E6, 29FC..29FF	11	L2/01-064		Ion, Patrick (2001-01-24), Mathematical Variant Symbols
3.2	U+2997..2998, 29D8..29DB, 29E6, 29FC..29FF	11	L2/01-067	N2318	Beeton, Barbara; Freytag, Asmus; Ion, Patrick (2001-01-25), Additional Mathematical Symbols
3.2	U+2997..2998, 29D8..29DB, 29E6, 29FC..29FF	11	L2/01-142	N2336	Beeton, Barbara; Freytag, Asmus; Ion, Patrick (2001-04-02), Additional Mathematical Symbols
3.2	U+2997..2998, 29D8..29DB, 29E6, 29FC..29FF	11	L2/01-156	N2356	Freytag, Asmus (2001-04-03), Additional Mathematical Characters (Draft 10)
3.2	U+2997..2998, 29D8..29DB, 29E6, 29FC..29FF	11	L2/01-159	N2344	Ad-hoc report on Mathematical Symbols, 2001-04-03
3.2	U+2997..2998, 29D8..29DB, 29E6, 29FC..29FF	11	L2/01-227		Whistler, Ken (2001-05-22), "ITEM 2 and 6", WG2 Consent Docket for UTC #87
3.2	U+2997..2998, 29D8..29DB, 29E6, 29FC..29FF	11	L2/01-184R		Moore, Lisa (2001-06-18), "Motion 87-M16, ITEM 2 and 6", Minutes from the UTC/L2 meeting
3.2	U+2997..2998, 29D8..29DB, 29E6, 29FC..29FF	11	L2/01-344	N2353 (pdf, doc)	Umamaheswaran, V. S. (2001-09-09), "7.7 Mathematical Symbols", Minutes from SC2/WG2 meeting #40 -- Mountain View, April 2001
3.2	U+2997..2998, 29D8..29DB, 29E6, 29FC..29FF	11	L2/01-386R	N2389R	Suignard, Michel (2001-10-26), "Ireland: Negative", Disposition of comments on SC2 N 3530 (FPDAM text for Amendment 1 to ISO/IEC 10646-1:2000) - revised version

== See also ==
- Mathematical operators and symbols in Unicode
