= Patrick Ion =

American mathematician

Patrick D. F. Ion
- Education: University of London
- Scientific career
- Fields: Mathematics
- Workplaces: Mathematical Reviews
- Doctoral advisor: Ray Streater

Patrick D. F. Ion is an American mathematician whose main interest is in mathematical knowledge management.

Ion completed his dissertation on quantum field theory, "Topics in Constructive QFT", in 1972 at the University of London under the supervision of Ray Streater. He continued to work in London, Groningen and Heidelberg in the field of quantum stochastics, q-analogues and the discrete Fourier transform in elementary geometry. He has also translated several mathematical monographs, e.g., of Jean-Pierre Serre and Wolfgang Hackbusch.

After joining Mathematical Reviews in 1980, Ion's main focus became the field of mathematical knowledge management. He was since then responsible for the decennial revisions of the Mathematics Subject Classification (MSC). He is co-chair of the World Wide Web Consortium Math Working Group, where he developed the MathML specifications. Moreover, he works on the role of the MSC in the Semantic Web, graph structures from bibliographic information of the mathematical literature and its relation to mathematical knowledge and sociology, and digital libraries.

In 2014 he became the chair of the Global Digital Mathematics Library Working Group of the International Mathematical Union.
