= List of medical abbreviations =

Abbreviations are used very frequently in medicine, despite being widely discouraged by the Institute of Safe Medicine Practices and other organizations concerned about patient safety. Abbreviations are especially discouraged when healthcare providers are communicating with patients and when there is a possibility of confusion between similar abbreviations. Some facilities maintain a list of acceptable abbreviations. Abbreviations are sometimes specific to a facility, which means that newer staff may be unfamiliar with them; this becomes a potential source of preventable medical errors.

The Joint Commission and other organizations maintain lists of certain medical abbreviations that should be avoided to prevent mistakes, according to best practices (and in some cases regulatory requirements); these are flagged in the list of abbreviations used in medical prescriptions.

== Orthographic styling ==
=== Periods (stops) ===
Periods (stops) are often used in styling abbreviations. Prevalent practice in medicine today is often to forgo them as unnecessary.

- Example:
  - Less common: The diagnosis was C.O.P.D.
    [chronic obstructive pulmonary disease]
  - More common: The diagnosis was COPD

=== Plurals ===
The prevalent way to represent plurals for medical acronyms and initialisms is simply to affix a lowercase s (no apostrophe).

- Example: one OCP, two OCPs [oral contraceptive pills].

=== Possessives ===
Possessive forms are not often needed, but can be formed using apostrophe + s. Often the writer can also recast the sentence to avoid it.

- Example:
  - BP's effect on risk of MI is multifaceted.
  - The effect of BP on MI risk is multifaceted.

=== Arrows ===
Arrows may be used to indicate numerous conditions including elevation (↑), diminution (↓), and causation (→, ←).

== Pronunciation ==
Pronunciation follows convention outside the medical field, in which acronyms are generally pronounced as if they were a word (JAMA, SIDS), initialisms are generally pronounced as individual letters (DNA, SSRI), and abbreviations generally use the expansion (soln. = "solution", sup. = "superior"). Abbreviations of weights and measures are pronounced using the expansion of the unit (mg = "milligram") and chemical symbols using the chemical expansion (NaCl = "sodium chloride").

Some initialisms deriving from Latin may be pronounced either as letters (qid = "cue eye dee") or using the English expansion (qid = "four times a day").

== Some common medical abbreviations ==
Notation conventions

- This series of lists omits periods from acronyms and initialisms.
- It uses periods for certain abbreviations that traditionally often have them (mostly older Latin/Neo-Latin abbreviations). For example, both bid and b.i.d. may be found in the list.
- It generally uses the singular form of an abbreviation (not the plural) as the headword.
- This list uses significant capitalization for headwords (the abbreviations) and their expansions.

Abb	Full name	Other
ABG	arterial blood gas	
ACE	angiotensin-converting enzyme	
ACTH	adrenocorticotropic hormone	
AFVSS	Afebrile, vital signs stable	
ADH	antidiuretic hormone	
AED	automated external defibrillator	
AIDS	acquired immunodeficiency syndrome	
ALP	alkaline phosphatase	
ALT	alanine aminotransferase	old version is SGPT
ASA	acetylsalicylic acid	aspirin
AST	aspartate aminotransferase	old version is SGOT
ATP	adenosine triphosphate	
BCG	bacille Calmette-Guérin	
bd, bid	2 times a day	
BIBA	brought in by ambulance	
BIBP, BIBPD	brought in by police	
BLS	basic life support	
BMR	basal metabolic rate	
BP	blood pressure	
BPAD	bipolar affective disorder	
BPD	borderline personality disorder	Often incorrectly used for bipolar disorder (BPAD is preferred)
BSA	body surface area	
BR	bedside rounds	
BUN	blood urea nitrogen	
C	Celsius; centigrade; complement	
Ca	calcium	
CAMP, cAMP	cyclic adenosine monophosphate	
CBC	complete blood count	
CDC	Centers for Disease Control and Prevention	
cGy	centigray	
Ci	curie	
CK	creatine kinase	
Cl	chloride; chlorine	
cm	centimeter(s)/centimetre(s)	
CNS	central nervous system	
CO2	carbon dioxide	
COPD	chronic obstructive pulmonary disease	
CPK	creatine phosphokinase	
CPK-MB	creatine phosphokinase muscle bandisoenzyme	
CPR	cardiopulmonary resuscitation	
CSF	cerebrospinal fluid	
CT	computed tomography	
Cu	cubic	
D & C	dilation and curettage	
dL	deciliter(s)/decilitre(s)	1 dL = 100 mL
DNA	deoxyribonucleic acid	
DTP	diphtheria-tetanus-pertussis(toxoids/vaccine)	
D/W	dextrose in water	
ECF	extracellular fluid	
ECG	electrocardiogram	
EEG	electroencephalogram	
EGD	esophagogastroduodenoscopy	
ENT	ear nose and throat	
ERCP	endoscopic retrograde cholangiopancreatography	
ESR	erythrocyte sedimentation rate	
F	Fahrenheit	
FDA	U.S. Food and Drug Administration	
Ft	foot; feet	measure unit
FUO	fever of unknown origin	
G, g	gram(s)	
GFR	glomerular filtration rate	
GI	gastrointestinal	
GVHD	graft-versus-host disease	
G6PD	glucose-6-phosphate dehydrogenase	
GU	genitourinary	
Gy	gray	
H, h, hr	hour(s)	'/24' is generally used in some regions.
Hb	hemoglobin	
HCl	hydrochloric acid; hydrochloride	
HCO3	bicarbonate	
Hct	hematocrit	
Hg	mercury	
HIPAA	Health Insurance Portability and Accountability Act	
HIV	human immunodeficiency virus	
HLA	human leukocyte antigen	
HMG-CoA	hydroxymethyl glutaryl coenzyme A	
hs	at bedtime	
Hz	hertz	cycles/second unit
ICF	intracellular fluid	
ICU	intensive care unit	
IgA	etc. immunoglobulin A	
IL	interleukin	
IM	intramuscular(ly)	
INR	international normalized ratio	
IPPB	intermittent positive pressure breathing	
IU	international unit	
IV	intravenous(ly)	
IVU	intravenous urography	
K	potassium	
kcal	kilocalorie(s)	mean food calorie
kg	kilogram(s)	
L	liter(s)/litre(s)	
lb	pound(s)	
LDH	lactic dehydrogenase	
LDLc	low-density lipoprotein cholesterol	
M	molar	
m	meter(s)/metre(s)	
mane	in the morning	
mc	micro-	required in some regions to avoid the confusion of 'μ' with 'm' ('milli-').
MCH	mean corpuscular hemoglobin	
MCHC	mean corpuscular hemoglobin concentration	
mCi	millicurie	
MCV	mean corpuscular volume	
mEq	Milliequivalent	
midi	midday	
Mg	magnesium	
mg	milligram(s)	
MI	myocardial infarction	
MIC	minimum inhibitory concentration	
min(s)	minute(s)	'/60' is used in some regions.
mIU	milli-international unit	
mL, ml	milliliter(s)/millilitre(s)	
mm	millimeter(s)/millimetre(s)	
mmol	millimole(s)	
mo	month	'/12' is used in some regions.
mol	wt molecular weight	
mOsm	milliosmole(s)	
MRI	magnetic resonance imaging	
N	nitrogen; normal	unit to measure strength of solution
Na	sodium	
NaCl	sodium chloride	
NAEON	no adverse events overnight	
ng	nanogram	billionth of a gram; also known as millimicrogram
nm	nanometer	billionth of a meter; also known as millimicron
nmol	nanomole	
nocte	at night	
Npo	nothing by mouth/nil by mouth	
NSAID	nonsteroidal anti-inflammatory drug	
O2	oxygen	
OTC	over-the-counter	pharmaceuticals
oz	ounce(s)	
P	phosphorus; pressure	
PAco2	alveolar carbon dioxide partial pressure	
Paco2	arterial carbon dioxide partial pressure	
PAo2	alveolar oxygen partial pressure	
Pao2	arterial oxygen partial pressure	
PAS	periodic acid-Schiff	
Pco2	carbon dioxide partial pressure	or tension
PCR	polymerase chain reaction	
PET	positron emission tomography	
pg	picogram(s)	micromicrogram
pH	hydrogen ion concentration	
PMN	polymorphonuclear leukocyte	
po	orally	
Po2	oxygen partial pressure	or tension
PPD	purified protein derivative	tuberculin
ppm	parts per million	
prn	as needed	from the Latin pro re nata
PT	prothrombin time	
PTT	partial thromboplastin time	
q	every	
qid	4 times a day	
qn	every night	From the Latin term quaque nocte
RA	rheumatoid arthritis	
RBC	red blood cell	
RNA	ribonucleic acid	
Sao2	arterial oxygen saturation	
SBE	subacute bacterial endocarditis	
sc	subcutaneous(ly)	
s/e	side-effect(s)	
SI	International System of Units	
SIDS	sudden infant death syndrome	
SLE	systemic lupus erythematosus	
soln	solution	
sp	species	singular
spp	species	plural
sp gr	specific gravity	
sq	square	
SSRI	selective serotonin reuptake inhibitor	
STS	serologic test(s) for syphilis	
T&A	tonsillectomy and adenoidectomy	
TB	tuberculosis	
tds	3 times a day	tid preferred in some regions
TIBC	total iron-binding capacity	
tid	3 times a day	tds preferred in some regions
TPN	total parenteral nutrition	
URI	upper respiratory infection	
URTI	upper respiratory tract infection	
UTI	urinary tract infection	
WBC	white blood cell	
WHO	World Health Organization	
WR	ward round	
wt	weight	
μ	micro-; micron	
μCi	microcurie	
μg	microgram(s)	
μL	microliter(s)/microlitre(s)	
μm	micrometer(s)/micrometre(s)	also referred to as microns
μmol	micromole(s)	
μOsm	micro-osmole(s)	
mμ	millimicron(s)	also referred to as nanometers/nanometres

== See also ==
- List of abbreviations used in medical prescriptions
- List of medical roots, suffixes and prefixes
- Medical dictionary
- Medical slang
- Abbreviation#Style conventions in English
- Acronym and initialism#Orthographic styling
