= Dingbat =

Typographic symbol class

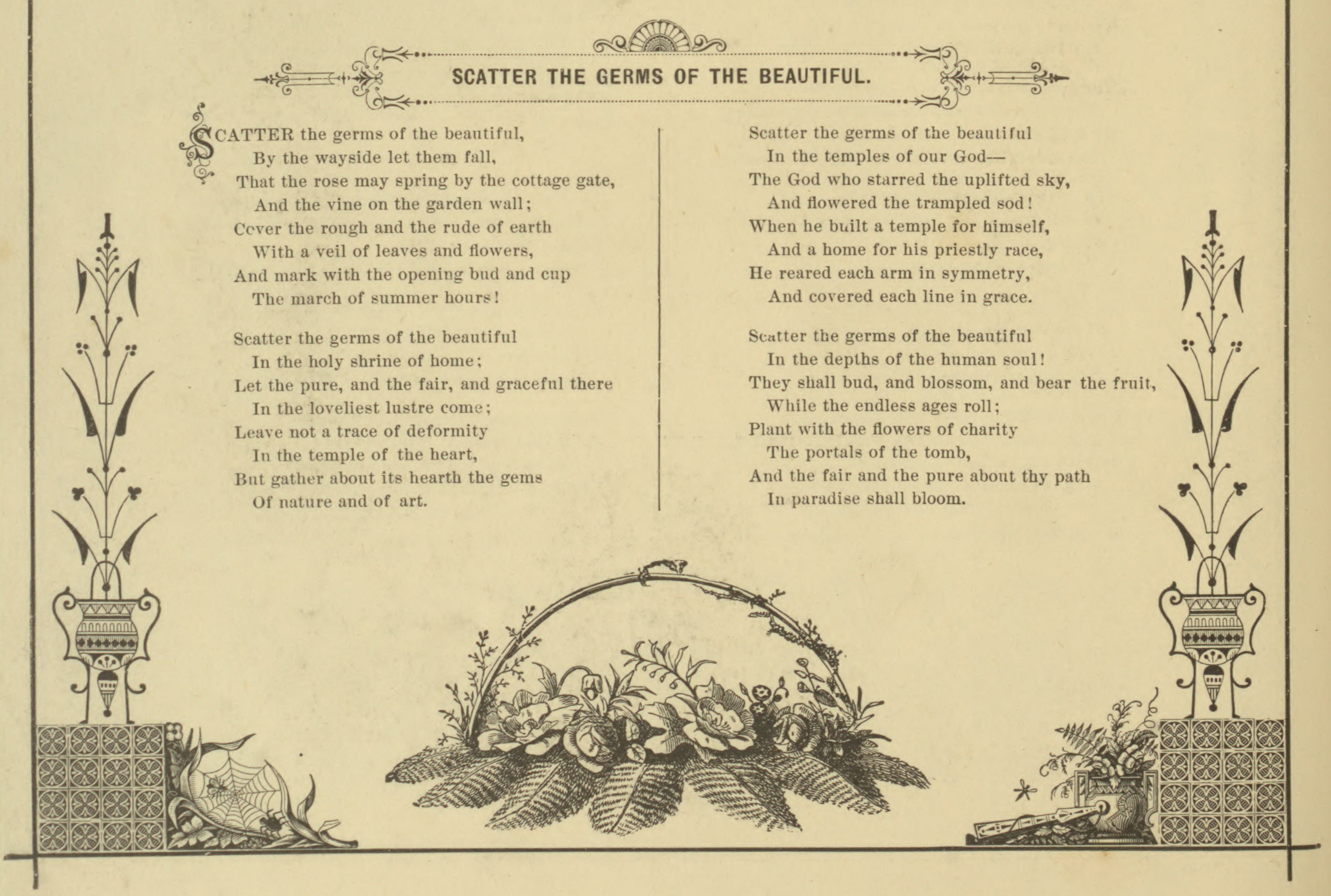
Poem typeset with generous use of decorative dingbats around the edges (1880s). Dingbats are not part of the text.

In typography, a dingbat (sometimes more formally known as a printer's ornament or printer's character) is an ornament, specifically a grapheme used in typesetting, often employed to create box frames (similar to box-drawing characters), or as a dinkus (section divider). Some of the dingbat symbols have been used as signature marks or used in bookbinding to order sections.

In the computer industry, a dingbat font or pi font is a computer font that has symbols and shapes located at the code points normally designated for alphabetical or numeric characters. This practice was necessitated by the limited number of code points available in 20th century operating systems. Modern computer fonts containing dingbats are based on Unicode encoding, which has unique code points for dingbats.

== Examples ==
Examples of characters included in Unicode (ITC Zapf Dingbats series 100 and others):

	✁	✂	✃	✄	✅	✆	✇	✈	✉	☛	☞	✌	✍	✎	✏
✐	✑	✒	✓	✔	✕	✖	✗	✘	✙	✚	✛	✜	✝	✞	✟
✠	✡	✢	✣	✤	✥	✦	✧	★	✩	✪	✫	✬	✭	✮	✯
✰	✱	✲	✳	✴	✵	✶	✷	✸	✹	✺	✻	✼	✽	✾	✿
❀	❁	❂	❃	❄	❅	❆	❇	❈	❉	❊	❋	●	❍	■	❏
☺	☻	♥	♦	♣	♠	•	◘	○	❐	❑	❒	▲	▼	◆	❖
◗	❘	❙	❚	❛	❜	❝	❞

== Dingbats Unicode block ==
Unicode provides code points for many commonly used dingbats, as listed below. Prior to widespread adoption of Unicode in the early 2010s, "dingbat fonts" were created that allocated dingbat graphemes to codepoints in code positions otherwise allocated to "normal" character sets.

Dingbats
- Range: U+2700..U+27BF (192 code points)
- Plane: BMP
- Scripts: Common
- Assigned: 192 code points
- Unused: 0 reserved code points
- Source standards: ITC Zapf Dingbats series 100

Unicode Version History
- 1.0.0 (1991): 160 (+160)
- 3.2 (2002): 174 (+14)
- 5.2 (2009): 175 (+1)
- 6.0 (2010): 191 (+16)
- 7.0 (2014): 192 (+1)

Unicode documentation
- Code chart ∣ Web page

The Dingbats block (U+2700–U+27BF) (under the original block name "Zapf Dingbats", so named for type designer Hermann Zapf) was added to the Unicode Standard in October 1991, with the release of version 1.0. This code block contains decorative character variants, and other marks of emphasis and non-textual symbolism. Most of its characters were taken from Zapf Dingbats. The block name was changed from "Zapf Dingbats" to "Dingbats" in June 1993, with the release of 1.1.

Dingbats^{[1]} Official Unicode Consortium code chart (PDF)
	0	1	2	3	4	5	6	7	8	9	A	B	C	D	E	F
U+270x	✀	✁	✂	✃	✄	✅	✆	✇	✈	✉	✊	✋	✌	✍	✎	✏
U+271x	✐	✑	✒	✓	✔	✕	✖	✗	✘	✙	✚	✛	✜	✝	✞	✟
U+272x	✠	✡	✢	✣	✤	✥	✦	✧	✨	✩	✪	✫	✬	✭	✮	✯
U+273x	✰	✱	✲	✳	✴	✵	✶	✷	✸	✹	✺	✻	✼	✽	✾	✿
U+274x	❀	❁	❂	❃	❄	❅	❆	❇	❈	❉	❊	❋	❌	❍	❎	❏
U+275x	❐	❑	❒	❓	❔	❕	❖	❗	❘	❙	❚	❛	❜	❝	❞	❟
U+276x	❠	❡	❢	❣	❤	❥	❦	❧	❨	❩	❪	❫	❬	❭	❮	❯
U+277x	❰	❱	❲	❳	❴	❵	❶	❷	❸	❹	❺	❻	❼	❽	❾	❿
U+278x	➀	➁	➂	➃	➄	➅	➆	➇	➈	➉	➊	➋	➌	➍	➎	➏
U+279x	➐	➑	➒	➓	➔	➕	➖	➗	➘	➙	➚	➛	➜	➝	➞	➟
U+27Ax	➠	➡	➢	➣	➤	➥	➦	➧	➨	➩	➪	➫	➬	➭	➮	➯
U+27Bx	➰	➱	➲	➳	➴	➵	➶	➷	➸	➹	➺	➻	➼	➽	➾	➿
Notes 1.As of Unicode version 18.0

== Ornamental Dingbats Unicode block ==
Ornamental Dingbats
- Range: U+1F650..U+1F67F (48 code points)
- Plane: SMP
- Scripts: Common
- Symbol sets: Leaf ornaments, ornamental punctuation
- Assigned: 48 code points
- Unused: 0 reserved code points
- Source standards: dingbat fonts Webdings, Wingdings, and Wingdings 2

Unicode Version History
- 7.0 (2014): 48 (+48)

Unicode documentation
- Code chart ∣ Web page

The Ornamental Dingbats block (U+1F650–U+1F67F) was added to the Unicode Standard in June 2014 with the release of version 7.0. This code block contains ornamental leaves, punctuation, and ampersands, quilt squares, and checkerboard patterns. It is a subset of dingbat fonts Webdings, Wingdings, and Wingdings 2.

Ornamental Dingbats^{[1]} Official Unicode Consortium code chart (PDF)
	0	1	2	3	4	5	6	7	8	9	A	B	C	D	E	F
U+1F65x	🙐	🙑	🙒	🙓	🙔	🙕	🙖	🙗	🙘	🙙	🙚	🙛	🙜	🙝	🙞	🙟
U+1F66x	🙠	🙡	🙢	🙣	🙤	🙥	🙦	🙧	🙨	🙩	🙪	🙫	🙬	🙭	🙮	🙯
U+1F67x	🙰	🙱	🙲	🙳	🙴	🙵	🙶	🙷	🙸	🙹	🙺	🙻	🙼	🙽	🙾	🙿
Notes 1.As of Unicode version 18.0

== Character table ==
Code	Result	Description
U+2700	✀	Black safety scissors
U+2701	✁	Upper blade scissors
U+2702	✂	Black scissors
U+2703	✃	Lower blade scissors
U+2704	✄	White scissors
U+2705	✅	White heavy check mark
U+2706	✆	Telephone location sign
U+2707	✇	Tape drive
U+2708	✈	Airplane
U+2709	✉	Envelope
U+270A	✊	Raised fist
U+270B	✋	Raised hand
U+270C	✌	Victory hand
U+270D	✍	Writing hand
U+270E	✎	Lower right pencil
U+270F	✏	Pencil
U+2710	✐	Upper right pencil
U+2711	✑	White nib
U+2712	✒	Black nib
U+2713	✓	Check mark
U+2714	✔	Heavy check mark
U+2715	✕	Multiplication X
U+2716	✖	Heavy multiplication X
U+2717	✗	Ballot X
U+2718	✘	Heavy ballot X
U+2719	✙	Outlined Greek cross
U+271A	✚	Heavy Greek cross
U+271B	✛	Open center cross
U+271C	✜	Heavy open center cross
U+271D	✝	Latin cross
U+271E	✞	Shadowed white Latin cross
U+271F	✟	Outlined Latin cross
U+2720	✠	Maltese cross
U+2721	✡	Star of David
U+2722	✢	Four teardrop-spoked asterisk
U+2723	✣	Four balloon-spoked asterisk
U+2724	✤	Heavy four balloon-spoked asterisk
U+2725	✥	Four club-spoked asterisk
U+2726	✦	Black four-pointed star
U+2727	✧	White four-pointed star
U+2728	✨	Sparkles
U+2729	✩	Stress outlined white star
U+272A	✪	Circled white star
U+272B	✫	Open center black star
U+272C	✬	Black center white star
U+272D	✭	Outlined black star
U+272E	✮	Heavy outlined black star
U+272F	✯	Pinwheel star
U+2730	✰	Shadowed white star
U+2731	✱	Heavy asterisk
U+2732	✲	Open center asterisk
U+2733	✳	Eight spoked asterisk
U+2734	✴	Eight pointed black star
U+2735	✵	Eight pointed pinwheel star
U+2736	✶	Six pointed black star
U+2737	✷	Eight pointed rectilinear black star
U+2738	✸	Heavy eight pointed rectilinear black star
U+2739	✹	Twelve pointed black star
U+273A	✺	Sixteen pointed asterisk
U+273B	✻	Teardrop spoked asterisk
U+273C	✼	Open center teardrop spoked asterisk
U+273D	✽	Heavy teardrop spoked asterisk
U+273E	✾	Six petalled black and white florette
U+273F	✿	Black florette
U+2740	❀	White florette
U+2741	❁	Eight petalled outlined black florette
U+2742	❂	Circled open center eight pointed star
U+2743	❃	Heavy teardrop spoked pinwheel asterisk
U+2744	❄	Snowflake
U+2745	❅	Tight trifoliate snowflake
U+2746	❆	Heavy chevron snowflake
U+2747	❇	Sparkle
U+2748	❈	Heavy sparkle
U+2749	❉	Balloon spoked asterisk
U+274A	❊	Eight teardrop spoked propeller asterisk
U+274B	❋	Heavy eight teardrop spoked propeller asterisk
U+274C	❌	Cross mark
U+274D	❍	Shadowed white circle
U+274E	❎	Negative squared cross mark
U+274F	❏	Lower right drop-shadowed white square
U+2750	❐	Upper right drop-shadowed white square
U+2751	❑	Lower right shadowed white square
U+2752	❒	Upper right shadowed white square
U+2753	❓	Black question mark ornament
U+2754	❔	White question mark ornament
U+2755	❕	White exclamation mark ornament
U+2756	❖	Black diamond minus white X
U+2757	❗	Heavy exclamation mark symbol
U+2758	❘	Light vertical bar
U+2759	❙	Medium vertical bar
U+275A	❚	Heavy vertical bar
U+275B	❛	Heavy single turned comma quotation mark ornament
U+275C	❜	Heavy single comma quotation mark ornament
U+275D	❝	Heavy double turned comma quotation mark ornament
U+275E	❞	Heavy double comma quotation mark ornament
U+275F	❜	Heavy low single comma quotation mark ornament
U+2760	❞	Heavy low double comma quotation mark ornament
U+2761	❡	Curved stem paragraph sign ornament
U+2762	❢	Heavy exclamation mark ornament
U+2763	❣	Heavy heart exclamation mark ornament
U+2764	❤	Heavy black heart
U+2765	❥	Rotated heavy black heart bullet
U+2766	❦	Floral heart
U+2767	❧	Rotated floral heart bullet
U+2768	❨	Medium left parenthesis ornament
U+2769	❩	Medium right parenthesis ornament
U+276A	❪	Medium flattened left parenthesis ornament
U+276B	❫	Medium flattened right parenthesis ornament
U+276C	❬	Medium left-pointing angle bracket ornament
U+276D	❭	Medium right-pointing angle bracket ornament
U+276E	❮	Heavy left-pointing angle quotation mark ornament
U+276F	❯	Heavy right-pointing angle quotation mark ornament
U+2770	❰	Heavy left-pointing angle bracket ornament
U+2771	❱	Heavy right-pointing angle bracket ornament
U+2772	❲	Light left tortoise shell bracket ornament
U+2773	❳	Light right tortoise shell bracket ornament
U+2774	❴	Medium left curly bracket ornament
U+2775	❵	Medium left curly bracket ornament
U+2776	❶	Dingbat negative circled digit one
U+2777	❷	Dingbat negative circled digit two
U+2778	❸	Dingbat negative circled digit three
U+2779	❹	Dingbat negative circled digit four
U+277A	❺	Dingbat negative circled digit five
U+277B	❻	Dingbat negative circled digit six
U+277C	❼	Dingbat negative circled digit seven
U+277D	❽	Dingbat negative circled digit eight
U+277E	❾	Dingbat negative circled digit nine
U+277F	❿	Dingbat negative circled digit ten
U+2780	➀	Dingbat circled sans-serif digit one
U+2781	➁	Dingbat circled sans-serif digit two
U+2782	➂	Dingbat circled sans-serif digit three
U+2783	➃	Dingbat circled sans-serif digit four
U+2784	➄	Dingbat circled sans-serif digit five
U+2785	➅	Dingbat circled sans-serif digit six
U+2786	➆	Dingbat circled sans-serif digit seven
U+2787	➇	Dingbat circled sans-serif digit eight
U+2788	➈	Dingbat circled sans-serif digit nine
U+2789	➉	Dingbat circled sans-serif digit ten
U+278A	➊	Dingbat negative circled sans-serif digit one
U+278B	➋	Dingbat negative circled sans-serif digit two
U+278C	➌	Dingbat negative circled sans-serif digit three
U+278D	➍	Dingbat negative circled sans-serif digit four
U+278E	➎	Dingbat negative circled sans-serif digit five
U+278F	➏	Dingbat negative circled sans-serif digit six
U+2790	➐	Dingbat negative circled sans-serif digit seven
U+2791	➑	Dingbat negative circled sans-serif digit eight
U+2792	➒	Dingbat negative circled sans-serif digit nine
U+2793	➓	Dingbat negative circled sans-serif digit ten
U+2794	➔	Heavy wide-headed rightward arrow
U+2795	➕	Heavy plus sign
U+2796	➖	Heavy minus sign
U+2797	➗	Heavy division sign
U+2798	➘	Heavy south east arrow
U+2799	➙	Heavy rightward arrow
U+279A	➚	Heavy north east arrow
U+279B	➛	Drafting point rightward arrow
U+279C	➜	Heavy round-tipped rightward arrow
U+279D	➝	Triangle-headed rightward arrow
U+279E	➞	Heavy triangle-headed rightward arrow
U+279F	➟	Dashed triangle-headed rightward arrow
U+27A0	➠	Heavy dashed triangle-headed rightward arrow
U+27A1	➡	Black rightward arrow
U+27A2	➢	Three-D top-lighted rightward arrowhead
U+27A3	➣	Three-D bottom-lighted rightward arrowhead
U+27A4	➤	Black rightward arrowhead
U+27A5	➥	Heavy black curved downward and rightward arrow
U+27A6	➦	Heavy black curved upward and rightward arrow
U+27A7	➧	Squat black rightward arrow
U+27A8	➨	Heavy concave-pointed black rightward arrow
U+27A9	➩	Right-shaded white rightward arrow
U+27AA	➪	Left-shaded white rightward arrow
U+27AB	➫	Back-tilted shadowed white rightward arrow
U+27AC	➬	Front-tilted shadowed white rightward arrow
U+27AD	➭	Heavy lower right-shadowed white rightward arrow
U+27AE	➮	Heavy upper right-shadowed white rightward arrow
U+27AF	➯	Notched lower right-shadowed white rightward arrow
U+27B0	➰	Curly loop
U+27B1	➱	Notched upper right-shadowed white rightward arrow
U+27B2	➲	Circled heavy white rightward arrow
U+27B3	➳	White-feathered rightward arrow
U+27B4	➴	Black-feathered south east arrow
U+27B5	➵	Black-feathered rightward arrow
U+27B6	➶	Black-feathered north east arrow
U+27B7	➷	Heavy black-feathered south east arrow
U+27B8	➸	Heavy black-feathered rightward arrow
U+27B9	➹	Heavy black-feathered north east arrow
U+27BA	➺	Teardrop-barbed rightward arrow
U+27BB	➻	Heavy teardrop-shanked rightward arrow
U+27BC	➼	Wedge-tailed rightward arrow
U+27BD	➽	Heavy wedge-tailed rightward arrow
U+27BE	➾	Open-outlined rightward arrow
U+27BF	➿	Double curly loop

== Dingbat fonts ==
- Webdings, a TrueType dingbat font designed at Microsoft and published in 1997
- Wingdings, a TrueType dingbat font assembled by Microsoft in 1990, using glyphs from Lucida Arrows, Lucida Icons, and Lucida Stars, three fonts they licensed from Charles Bigelow and Kris Holmes
- Zapf Dingbats, a dingbat font designed by Hermann Zapf in 1978, and licensed by International Typeface Corporation

== See also ==
- Arrows in Unicode blocks
- Asterism (typography), a triangle of asterisks
- Fleuron (typography), known as a class of horticultural dingbats
- Punctuation
- Text semigraphics, a method for emulating raster graphics using text mode video hardware
- Unicode symbols
