= Dingbats (Unicode block) =

- Range: U+2700..U+27BF (192 code points)
- Plane: BMP
- Scripts: Common
- Assigned: 192 code points
- Unused: 0 reserved code points
- Source standards: ITC Zapf Dingbats series 100

Unicode Version History
- 1.0.0 (1991): 160 (+160)
- 3.2 (2002): 174 (+14)
- 5.2 (2009): 175 (+1)
- 6.0 (2010): 191 (+16)
- 7.0 (2014): 192 (+1)

Unicode documentation
- Code chart ∣ Web page

Dingbats is a Unicode block containing dingbats (or typographical ornaments, like the ❦ FLORAL HEART character). Most of its characters were taken from Zapf Dingbats; it was the Unicode block to have imported characters from a specific typeface; Unicode later adopted a policy that excluded symbols with "no demonstrated need or strong desire to exchange in plain text", and thus no further dingbat typefaces were encoded until Webdings and Wingdings were encoded in Version 7.0. Some ornaments are also an emoji, having optional presentation variants (called variant selectors).

The block, originally named "Zapf Dingbats", was added to the Unicode Standard in October 1991, with the release of version 1.0. The block name was changed from "Zapf Dingbats" to "Dingbats" in June 1993, with the release of 1.1.

== Chart ==
Dingbats^{[1]} Official Unicode Consortium code chart (PDF)
	0	1	2	3	4	5	6	7	8	9	A	B	C	D	E	F
U+270x	✀	✁	✂	✃	✄	✅	✆	✇	✈	✉	✊	✋	✌	✍	✎	✏
U+271x	✐	✑	✒	✓	✔	✕	✖	✗	✘	✙	✚	✛	✜	✝	✞	✟
U+272x	✠	✡	✢	✣	✤	✥	✦	✧	✨	✩	✪	✫	✬	✭	✮	✯
U+273x	✰	✱	✲	✳	✴	✵	✶	✷	✸	✹	✺	✻	✼	✽	✾	✿
U+274x	❀	❁	❂	❃	❄	❅	❆	❇	❈	❉	❊	❋	❌	❍	❎	❏
U+275x	❐	❑	❒	❓	❔	❕	❖	❗	❘	❙	❚	❛	❜	❝	❞	❟
U+276x	❠	❡	❢	❣	❤	❥	❦	❧	❨	❩	❪	❫	❬	❭	❮	❯
U+277x	❰	❱	❲	❳	❴	❵	❶	❷	❸	❹	❺	❻	❼	❽	❾	❿
U+278x	➀	➁	➂	➃	➄	➅	➆	➇	➈	➉	➊	➋	➌	➍	➎	➏
U+279x	➐	➑	➒	➓	➔	➕	➖	➗	➘	➙	➚	➛	➜	➝	➞	➟
U+27Ax	➠	➡	➢	➣	➤	➥	➦	➧	➨	➩	➪	➫	➬	➭	➮	➯
U+27Bx	➰	➱	➲	➳	➴	➵	➶	➷	➸	➹	➺	➻	➼	➽	➾	➿
Notes 1.As of Unicode version 18.0

== Emoji ==
The Dingbats block contains 33 emoji. 66 standardized variants are defined to specify emoji-style (like U+FE0F VS16) or text presentation (like U+FE0E VS15) for 33 characters.

Emoji variation sequences
U+	2702	2705	2708	2709	270A	270B	270C	270D	270F	2712	2714
default presentation	text	emoji	text	text	emoji	emoji	text	text	text	text	text
base code point	✂	✅	✈	✉	✊	✋	✌	✍	✏	✒	✔
base+VS15 (text)	✂︎	✅︎	✈︎	✉︎	✊︎	✋︎	✌︎	✍︎	✏︎	✒︎	✔︎
base+VS16 (emoji)	✂️	✅️	✈️	✉️	✊️	✋️	✌️	✍️	✏️	✒️	✔️
U+	2716	271D	2721	2728	2733	2734	2744	2747	274C	274E	2753
default presentation	text	text	text	emoji	text	text	text	text	emoji	emoji	emoji
base code point	✖	✝	✡	✨	✳	✴	❄	❇	❌	❎	❓
base+VS15 (text)	✖︎	✝︎	✡︎	✨︎	✳︎	✴︎	❄︎	❇︎	❌︎	❎︎	❓︎
base+VS16 (emoji)	✖️	✝️	✡️	✨️	✳️	✴️	❄️	❇️	❌️	❎️	❓️
U+	2754	2755	2757	2763	2764	2795	2796	2797	27A1	27B0	27BF
default presentation	emoji	emoji	emoji	text	text	emoji	emoji	emoji	text	emoji	emoji
base code point	❔	❕	❗	❣	❤	➕	➖	➗	➡	➰	➿
base+VS15 (text)	❔︎	❕︎	❗︎	❣︎	❤︎	➕︎	➖︎	➗︎	➡︎	➰︎	➿︎
base+VS16 (emoji)	❔️	❕️	❗️	❣️	❤️	➕️	➖️	➗️	➡️	➰️	➿️

=== Emoji modifiers ===
The Dingbats block has four emoji that represent hands. They can be modified using U+1F3FB–U+1F3FF to provide for a range of human skin color using the Fitzpatrick scale:

Human emoji
U+	270A	270B	270C	270D
emoji	✊	✋	✌️	✍️
FITZ-1-2	✊🏻	✋🏻	✌🏻	✍🏻
FITZ-3	✊🏼	✋🏼	✌🏼	✍🏼
FITZ-4	✊🏽	✋🏽	✌🏽	✍🏽
FITZ-5	✊🏾	✋🏾	✌🏾	✍🏾
FITZ-6	✊🏿	✋🏿	✌🏿	✍🏿

Additional human emoji can be found in other Unicode blocks: Emoticons, Miscellaneous Symbols, Miscellaneous Symbols and Pictographs, Supplemental Symbols and Pictographs, Symbols and Pictographs Extended-A and Transport and Map Symbols.

== History ==
The following Unicode-related documents record the purpose and process of defining specific characters in the Dingbats block:

Version	Final code points (Note: Proposed code points and characters names may differ from final code points and names)	Count	L2 ID	WG2 ID	Document
1.0.0	U+2701..2704, 2706..2709, 270C..2727, 2729..274B, 274D, 274F..2752, 2756, 2758..275E, 2761..2767, 2776..2794, 2798..27AF, 27B1..27BE	160			(to be determined)
1.0.0	U+2701..2704, 2706..2709, 270C..2727, 2729..274B, 274D, 274F..2752, 2756, 2758..275E, 2761..2767, 2776..2794, 2798..27AF, 27B1..27BE	160	L2/11-438 (Note: See also L2/10-458, L2/11-414, L2/11-415, and L2/11-429) (Note: Refer to the history section of the Miscellaneous Symbols and Pictographs block for additional emoji-related documents)	N4182	Edberg, Peter (2011-12-22), Emoji Variation Sequences (Revision of L2/11-429)
1.0.0	U+2701..2704, 2706..2709, 270C..2727, 2729..274B, 274D, 274F..2752, 2756, 2758..275E, 2761..2767, 2776..2794, 2798..27AF, 27B1..27BE	160	L2/15-050R (Note: See also L2/13-207, L2/14-054, L2/14-063, L2/15-051A, L2/15-051B)		Davis, Mark; et al. (2015-01-29), Additional variation selectors for emoji
1.0.0	U+2701..2704, 2706..2709, 270C..2727, 2729..274B, 274D, 274F..2752, 2756, 2758..275E, 2761..2767, 2776..2794, 2798..27AF, 27B1..27BE	160	L2/15-301 (Note: See also L2/15-198 and L2/15-275)		Pournader, Roozbeh (2015-11-01), A proposal for 278 standardized variation sequences for emoji
1.0.0	U+2701..2704, 2706..2709, 270C..2727, 2729..274B, 274D, 274F..2752, 2756, 2758..275E, 2761..2767, 2776..2794, 2798..27AF, 27B1..27BE	160	L2/19-377R		Daniel, Jennifer (2020-01-14), Multi-skintone Couples with Heart and Couples Kissing, Emoji ZWJ Sequences for Unicode 14.0 [Affects U+2764]
1.0.0	U+2701..2704, 2706..2709, 270C..2727, 2729..274B, 274D, 274F..2752, 2756, 2758..275E, 2761..2767, 2776..2794, 2798..27AF, 27B1..27BE	160	L2/20-015R		Moore, Lisa (2020-05-14), "Consensus 162-C8", Draft Minutes of UTC Meeting 162, "Accept 200 provisional emoji candidates"
3.2	U+2768..2775	14	L2/00-420		Patel, Sairus (2000-11-21), Proposal for additional 14 Dingbats
3.2	U+2768..2775	14	L2/00-436		Patel, Sairus (2000-12-18), Proposal to complete the Dingbats block in Unicode/ISO-IEC 10646
3.2	U+2768..2775	14	L2/01-087	N2321	Patel, Sairus (2001-01-31), Proposal to complete the Dingbats block in Unicode/ISO-IEC 10646
3.2	U+2768..2775	14	L2/01-012R		Moore, Lisa (2001-05-21), "Dingbats", Minutes UTC #86 in Mountain View, Jan 2001
3.2	U+2768..2775	14	L2/01-344	N2353 (pdf, doc)	Umamaheswaran, V. S. (2001-09-09), "7.8 Proposal to complete the Dingbats block in 10646", Minutes from SC2/WG2 meeting #40 -- Mountain View, April 2001
5.2	U+2757	1		N3353 (pdf, doc)	Umamaheswaran, V. S. (2007-10-10), "M51.32", Unconfirmed minutes of WG 2 meeting 51 Hanzhou, China; 2007-04-24/27
5.2	U+2757	1	L2/07-259		Suignard, Michel (2007-08-02), Japanese TV Symbols
5.2	U+2757	1	L2/07-391	N3341	Suignard, Michel (2007-09-18), Japanese TV Symbols
5.2	U+2757	1	L2/08-077R2	N3397	Suignard, Michel (2008-03-11), Japanese TV symbols
5.2	U+2757	1	L2/08-128		Iancu, Laurențiu (2008-03-22), Names and allocation of some Japanese TV symbols from N3397
5.2	U+2757	1	L2/08-158		Pentzlin, Karl (2008-04-16), Comments on L2/08-077R2 "Japanese TV Symbols"
5.2	U+2757	1	L2/08-188	N3468	Sekiguchi, Masahiro (2008-04-22), Collected comments on Japanese TV Symbols (WG2 N3397)
5.2	U+2757	1	L2/08-077R3	N3469	Suignard, Michel (2008-04-23), Japanese TV symbols
5.2	U+2757	1	L2/08-215		Pentzlin, Karl (2008-05-07), Comments on L2/08-077R2 "Japanese TV Symbols"
5.2	U+2757	1	L2/08-289		Pentzlin, Karl (2008-08-05), Proposal to rename and reassign some Japanese TV Symbols from L2/08-077R3
5.2	U+2757	1	L2/08-292		Stötzner, Andreas (2008-08-06), Improvement suggestions for n3469
5.2	U+2757	1	L2/08-307		Scherer, Markus (2008-08-08), Feedback on the Japanese TV Symbols Proposal (L2/08-077R3)
5.2	U+2757	1	L2/08-318	N3453 (pdf, doc)	Umamaheswaran, V. S. (2008-08-13), "M52.14", Unconfirmed minutes of WG 2 meeting 52
5.2	U+2757	1	L2/08-161R2		Moore, Lisa (2008-11-05), "Consensus 115-C17", UTC #115 Minutes, "Approve 186 Japanese TV symbols for encoding in a future version of the standard."
5.2	U+2757	1	L2/09-064		Scherer, Markus (2009-01-29), Request to change some ARIB/AMD6 character names and a code point
5.2	U+2757	1	L2/09-234	N3603 (pdf, doc)	Umamaheswaran, V. S. (2009-07-08), "M54.03b", Unconfirmed minutes of WG 2 meeting 54
5.2	U+2757	1	L2/11-438	N4182	Edberg, Peter (2011-12-22), Emoji Variation Sequences (Revision of L2/11-429)
6.0	U+2705, 270A..270B, 2728, 274C, 274E, 2753..2755, 2795..2797, 27B0, 27BF	14	L2/09-025R2	N3582 (Note: Japanese translation of N3582 is available as N3621)	Scherer, Markus; Davis, Mark; Momoi, Kat; Tong, Darick; Kida, Yasuo; Edberg, Peter (2009-03-05), Proposal for Encoding Emoji Symbols
6.0	U+2705, 270A..270B, 2728, 274C, 274E, 2753..2755, 2795..2797, 27B0, 27BF	14	L2/09-026R	N3583	Scherer, Markus; Davis, Mark; Momoi, Kat; Tong, Darick; Kida, Yasuo; Edberg, Peter (2009-02-06), Emoji Symbols Proposed for New Encoding
6.0	U+2705, 270A..270B, 2728, 274C, 274E, 2753..2755, 2795..2797, 27B0, 27BF	14	L2/09-027R2	N3681	Scherer, Markus (2009-09-17), Emoji Symbols: Background Data
6.0	U+2705, 270A..270B, 2728, 274C, 274E, 2753..2755, 2795..2797, 27B0, 27BF	14	L2/09-114	N3607	Towards an encoding of symbol characters used as emoji, 2009-04-06
6.0	U+2705, 270A..270B, 2728, 274C, 274E, 2753..2755, 2795..2797, 27B0, 27BF	14	L2/09-412	N3722	Suignard, Michel (2009-10-26), "Ireland T2", Disposition of comments on SC2 N 4078 (PDAM text for Amendment 8 to ISO/IEC 10646:2003)
6.0	U+2705, 270A..270B, 2728, 274C, 274E, 2753..2755, 2795..2797, 27B0, 27BF	14		N3703 (pdf, doc)	Umamaheswaran, V. S. (2010-04-13), "M55.9h", Unconfirmed minutes of WG 2 meeting no. 55, Tokyo 2009-10-26/30
6.0	U+2705, 270A..270B, 2728, 274C, 274E, 2753..2755, 2795..2797, 27B0, 27BF	14	L2/09-335R		Moore, Lisa (2009-11-10), "Consensus 121-C10", UTC #121 / L2 #218 Minutes
6.0	U+2705, 270A..270B, 2728, 274C, 274E, 2753..2755, 2795..2797, 27B0, 27BF	14	L2/10-088	N3776	DoCoMo Input on Emoji, 2010-03-08
6.0	U+2705, 270A..270B, 2728, 274C, 274E, 2753..2755, 2795..2797, 27B0, 27BF	14	L2/10-089	N3777	KDDI Input on Emoji, 2010-03-08
6.0	U+2705, 270A..270B, 2728, 274C, 274E, 2753..2755, 2795..2797, 27B0, 27BF	14	L2/10-137	N3828	Suignard, Michel (2010-04-22), "JP.G11b, JP.T5, JP.T12", Disposition of comments on SC2 N 4123 (FPDAM text for Amendment 8 to ISO/IEC 10646:2003)
6.0	U+2705, 270A..270B, 2728, 274C, 274E, 2753..2755, 2795..2797, 27B0, 27BF	14	L2/10-132		Scherer, Markus; Davis, Mark; Momoi, Kat; Tong, Darick; Kida, Yasuo; Edberg, Peter (2010-04-27), Emoji Symbols: Background Data
6.0	U+2705, 270A..270B, 2728, 274C, 274E, 2753..2755, 2795..2797, 27B0, 27BF	14	L2/10-138	N3829	Constable, Peter; et al. (2010-04-27), "10", Emoji Ad-Hoc Meeting Report
6.0	U+2705, 270A..270B, 2728, 274C, 274E, 2753..2755, 2795..2797, 27B0, 27BF	14	L2/16-361		Pournader, Roozbeh; Felt, Doug (2016-11-07), Add text and emoji standardized variation sequences for 96 symbols
6.0	U+2705, 270A..270B, 2728, 274C, 274E, 2753..2755, 2795..2797, 27B0, 27BF	14	L2/22-229R		Leroy, Robin; Davis, Mark (2022-10-28), Proposed changes to Unicode properties and reports for source code handling, "Add to the file emoji-variation-sequences.txt any code points from the following set that are not already in it...[Affects U+2705, 270A, 270B, 2728, 274C, 274E, 2754, 2755, 2795–2797, 27B0, and 27BF]"
6.0	U+2705, 270A..270B, 2728, 274C, 274E, 2753..2755, 2795..2797, 27B0, 27BF	14	L2/22-241		Constable, Peter (2022-11-09), "Consensus 173-C29", Approved Minutes of UTC Meeting 173, "Accept the proposals in L2/22-229R"
6.0	U+275F..2760	2	L2/09-021	N3565	Proposal to encode two heavy low quotes for German in the UCS Dingbats block, 2009-01-15
6.0	U+275F..2760	2	L2/09-003R		Moore, Lisa (2009-02-12), "D.7", UTC #118 / L2 #215 Minutes
6.0	U+275F..2760	2	L2/09-234	N3603 (pdf, doc)	Umamaheswaran, V. S. (2009-07-08), "M54.13b", Unconfirmed minutes of WG 2 meeting 54
7.0	U+2700	1	L2/11-052R		Suignard, Michel (2011-02-15), Wingdings and Webdings symbols - Preliminary study
7.0	U+2700	1	L2/11-149		Suignard, Michel (2011-05-09), Proposal to add Wingdings and Webdings symbols
7.0	U+2700	1	L2/11-196	N4022	Suignard, Michel (2011-05-21), Revised Wingdings proposal
7.0	U+2700	1	L2/11-247	N4115	Suignard, Michel (2011-06-08), Proposal to add Wingdings and Webdings Symbols
7.0	U+2700	1	L2/11-344	N4143	Suignard, Michel (2011-09-28), Updated proposal to add Wingdings and Webdings Symbols
7.0	U+2700	1		N4103	"10.2.1 Wingdings/Webdings additions", Unconfirmed minutes of WG 2 meeting 58, 2012-01-03
7.0	U+2700	1	L2/12-130	N4239	Suignard, Michel (2012-05-08), "E4.", Disposition of comments on SC2 N 4201 (PDAM text for Amendment 1.2 to ISO/IEC 10646 3rd edition)
7.0	U+2700	1		N4363	Suignard, Michel (2012-10-13), Status of encoding of Wingdings and Webdings Symbols
7.0	U+2700	1	L2/12-368	N4384	Suignard, Michel (2012-11-06), Status of encoding of Wingdings and Webdings Symbols
7.0	U+2700	1	L2/12-086	N4223	Requests regarding the Wingdings/Webdings characters in ISO/IEC 10646 PDAM 1.2, 2012-12-27

== See also ==
- Ornamental Dingbats, another Unicode block
