= Ornamental Dingbats =

- Range: U+1F650..U+1F67F (48 code points)
- Plane: SMP
- Scripts: Common
- Symbol sets: Leaf ornaments Ornamental punctuation
- Assigned: 48 code points
- Unused: 0 reserved code points
- Source standards: dingbat fonts Webdings, Wingdings, and Wingdings 2

Unicode version history
- 7.0 (2014): 48 (+48)

Unicode documentation
- Code chart ∣ Web page

Ornamental Dingbats is a Unicode block containing ornamental leaves, punctuation, and ampersands, quilt squares, and checkerboard patterns. It is a subset of dingbat fonts Webdings, Wingdings, and Wingdings 2.

Ornamental Dingbats^{[1]} Official Unicode Consortium code chart (PDF)
| | 0 | 1 | 2 | 3 | 4 | 5 | 6 | 7 | 8 | 9 | A | B | C | D | E | F |
| U+1F65x | 🙐 | 🙑 | 🙒 | 🙓 | 🙔 | 🙕 | 🙖 | 🙗 | 🙘 | 🙙 | 🙚 | 🙛 | 🙜 | 🙝 | 🙞 | 🙟 |
| U+1F66x | 🙠 | 🙡 | 🙢 | 🙣 | 🙤 | 🙥 | 🙦 | 🙧 | 🙨 | 🙩 | 🙪 | 🙫 | 🙬 | 🙭 | 🙮 | 🙯 |
| U+1F67x | 🙰 | 🙱 | 🙲 | 🙳 | 🙴 | 🙵 | 🙶 | 🙷 | 🙸 | 🙹 | 🙺 | 🙻 | 🙼 | 🙽 | 🙾 | 🙿 |
Notes: 1. As of Unicode version 16.0

== History ==
The following Unicode-related documents record the purpose and process of defining specific characters in the Ornamental Dingbats block:

| Version | Final code points (Note: Proposed code points and characters names may differ from final code points and names) | Count | L2 ID | WG2 ID | Document |
|---|---|---|---|---|---|
| 7.0 | U+1F650..1F67F | 48 | L2/11-052R | | Suignard, Michel (2011-02-15), Wingdings and Webdings symbols - Preliminary study |
| 7.0 | U+1F650..1F67F | 48 | L2/11-149 | | Suignard, Michel (2011-05-09), Proposal to add Wingdings and Webdings symbols |
| 7.0 | U+1F650..1F67F | 48 | L2/11-196 | N4022 | Suignard, Michel (2011-05-21), Revised Wingdings proposal |
| 7.0 | U+1F650..1F67F | 48 | L2/11-247 | N4115 | Suignard, Michel (2011-06-08), Proposal to add Wingdings and Webdings Symbols |
| 7.0 | U+1F650..1F67F | 48 | L2/11-344 | N4143 | Suignard, Michel (2011-09-28), Updated proposal to add Wingdings and Webdings Symbols |
| 7.0 | U+1F650..1F67F | 48 | L2/11-417 | N4155 | Proposal to encode an additional sans-serif heavy double quote symbol in the UCS, 2011-10-17 |
| 7.0 | U+1F650..1F67F | 48 | | N4103 | "10.2.1 Wingdings/Webdings additions", Unconfirmed minutes of WG 2 meeting 58, 2012-01-03 |
| 7.0 | U+1F650..1F67F | 48 | L2/12-130 | N4239 | Suignard, Michel (2012-05-08), Disposition of comments on SC2 N 4201 (PDAM text for Amendment 1.2 to ISO/IEC 10646 3rd edition) |
| 7.0 | U+1F650..1F67F | 48 | | N4253 (pdf, doc) | "M59.01f", Unconfirmed minutes of WG 2 meeting 59, 2012-09-12 |
| 7.0 | U+1F650..1F67F | 48 | | N4363 | Suignard, Michel (2012-10-13), Status of encoding of Wingdings and Webdings Symbols |
| 7.0 | U+1F650..1F67F | 48 | L2/12-368 | N4384 | Suignard, Michel (2012-11-06), Status of encoding of Wingdings and Webdings Symbols |
| 7.0 | U+1F650..1F67F | 48 | L2/12-086 | N4223 | Requests regarding the Wingdings/Webdings characters in ISO/IEC 10646 PDAM 1.2, 2012-12-27 |

== See also ==
- Dingbats (Unicode block)
