= Starburst (symbol) =

A starburst is graphic design or typographical element that resembles diverging rays of light or consists of a star-like image with rays emanating from it. One is notably used as the current logo of the American retailer Walmart.

In Unicode, there are various star and asterisk symbols. The ones most commonly associated with the idea of a starburst are the "sixteen pointed asterisk" U+273A (✺) and the "combining Cyrillic millions" character U+0489 ( ҉ ).
