= Wingdings =

Fonts for dingbats

Wingdings series
- Language: Dingbat ornaments
- Definitions: UTC L2/12-368
- Classification: Pi fonts
- Other related encodings: Webdings, Zapf Dingbats, Bookshelf Symbol 7

Wingdings is a series of dingbat fonts that render letters as a variety of symbols. They were originally developed in 1990 by Microsoft by combining glyphs from Lucida Icons, Arrows, and Stars licensed from Charles Bigelow and Kris Holmes. Certain versions of the font's copyright string include attribution to Type Solutions, Inc., the maker of a tool used to hint the font.

None of the characters were mapped to Unicode at the time; however, Unicode approved the addition of many symbols in the Wingdings and Webdings fonts in Unicode 7.0.

== Versions ==
=== Wingdings ===
Wingdings
- Category: Symbol
- Designers: Charles Bigelow; Kris Holmes
- Foundry: Charles Bigelow and Kris Holmes, Microsoft Corp.
- Date released: 1990
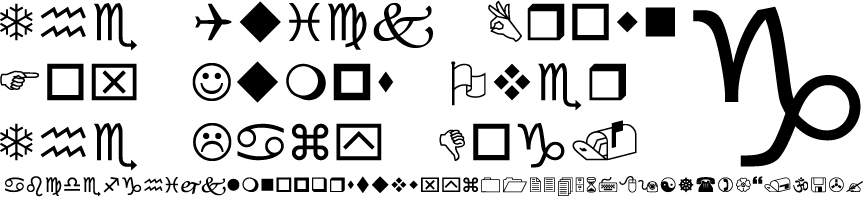
- Sample

Wingdings is a TrueType dingbat font included in Microsoft Windows since version 3.1 onwards, and also in a number of application packages of that era.

The Wingdings trademark is owned by Microsoft, and the design and glyph order was awarded U.S. Design Patent D341848 in 1993. The patent expired in 2007. In many other countries, a Design Patent would be called a registered design. It is registration of a design to deter imitation, rather than a claim of a novel invention.

This font contains many largely recognized shapes and gestures as well as some recognized world symbols, such as the Star of David, the symbols of the zodiac, index or manicule signs, hand gestures, and obscure ampersands. Although this table may display shaded or colored icons (due to lack of browser support for U+FE0E ︎ VARIATION SELECTOR-15) all the characters were black and white.

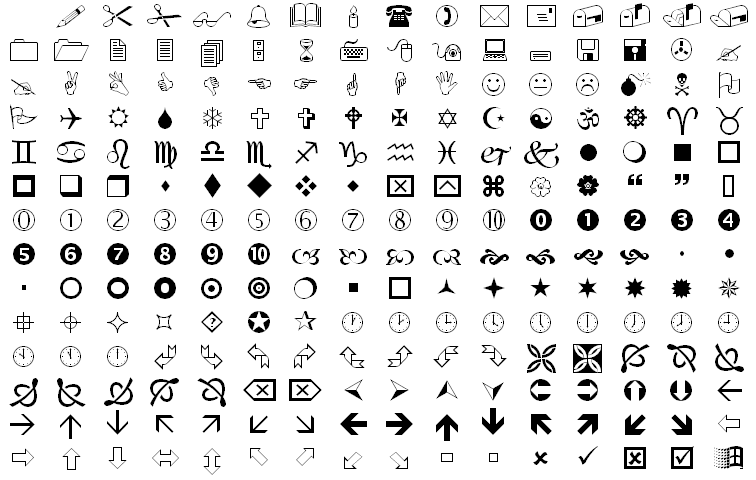
Mosaic of Wingdings characters

Wingdings
	0	1	2	3	4	5	6	7	8	9	A	B	C	D	E	F
0x																
1x																
2x	SP	🖉 1F589	✂ 2702	✁ 2701	👓︎ 1F453	🕭 1F56D	🕮 1F56E	🕯︎ 1F56F	🕿 1F57F	✆ 2706	🖂 1F582	🖃 1F583	📪︎ 1F4EA	📫︎ 1F4EB	📬︎ 1F4EC	📭︎ 1F4ED
3x	🗀 1F5C0	🗁 1F5C1	🗎 1F5CE	🗏 1F5CF	🗐 1F5D0	🗄︎ 1F5C4	⏳︎ 23F3	🖮 1F5AE	🖰 1F5B0	🖲︎ 1F5B2	🖳 1F5B3	🖴 1F5B4	🖫 1F5AB	🖬 1F5AC	✇ 2707	✍︎ 270D
4x	🖎 1F58E	✌︎ 270C	🖏 1F58F	👍︎ 1F44D	👎︎ 1F44E	☜ 261C	☞ 261E	☝︎ 261D	🖗 1F597	🖐︎ 1F590	☺︎ 263A	😐︎ 1F610	☹︎ 2639	💣︎ 1F4A3	🕱 1F571	🏳 1F3F3
5x	🏱 1F3F1	✈ 2708	☼ 263C	🌢 1F322	❄ 2744	🕆 1F546	✞ 271E	🕈 1F548	✠ 2720	✡ 2721	☪ 262A	☯ 262F	🕉︎ 1F549	☸ 2638	♈︎ 2648	♉︎ 2649
6x	♊︎ 264A	♋︎ 264B	♌︎ 264C	♍︎ 264D	♎︎ 264E	♏︎ 264F	♐︎ 2650	♑︎ 2651	♒︎ 2652	♓︎ 2653	🙰 1F670	🙵 1F675	⚫︎ 26AB	🔾 1F53E	◼ 25FC	🞏 1F78F
7x	🞐 1F790	❑ 2751	❒ 2752	🞟 1F79F	⧫ 29EB	◆ 25C6	❖ 2756	🞙 1F799	⌧ 2327	⮹ 2BB9	⌘ 2318	🏵︎ 1F3F5	🏶 1F3F6	🙶 1F676	🙷 1F677	
8x	🄋 1F10B	➀ 2780	➁ 2781	➂ 2782	➃ 2783	➄ 2784	➅ 2785	➆ 2786	➇ 2787	➈ 2788	➉ 2789	🄌 1F10C	➊ 278A	➋ 278B	➌ 278C	➍ 278D
9x	➎ 278E	➏ 278F	➐ 2790	➑ 2791	➒ 2792	➓ 2793	🙢 1F662	🙠 1F660	🙡 1F661	🙣 1F663	🙞 1F65E	🙜 1F65C	🙝 1F65D	🙟 1F65F	∙ 2219	• 2022
Ax	⬝ 2B1D	⭘ 2B58	🞆 1F786	🞈 1F788	🞊 1F78A	🞋 1F78B	🔿 1F53F	▪ 25AA	🞎 1F78E	🟁 1F7C1	🟅 1F7C5	★ 2605	🟋 1F7CB	🟏 1F7CF	🟓 1F7D3	🟑 1F7D1
Bx	⯐ 2BD0	⌖ 2316	⯎ 2BCE	⯏ 2BCF	⯑ 2BD1	✪ 272A	✰ 2730	🕐︎ 1F550	🕑︎ 1F551	🕒︎ 1F552	🕓︎ 1F553	🕔︎ 1F554	🕕︎ 1F555	🕖︎ 1F556	🕗︎ 1F557	🕘︎ 1F558
Cx	🕙︎ 1F559	🕚︎ 1F55A	🕛︎ 1F55B	⮰ 2BB0	⮱ 2BB1	⮲ 2BB2	⮳ 2BB3	⮴ 2BB4	⮵ 2BB5	⮶ 2BB6	⮷ 2BB7	🙪 1F66A	🙫 1F66B	🙕 1F655	🙔 1F654	🙗 1F657
Dx	🙖 1F656	🙐 1F650	🙑 1F651	🙒 1F652	🙓 1F653	⌫ 232B	⌦ 2326	⮘ 2B98	⮚ 2B9A	⮙ 2B99	⮛ 2B9B	⮈ 2B88	⮊ 2B8A	⮉ 2B89	⮋ 2B8B	🡨 1F868
Ex	🡪 1F86A	🡩 1F869	🡫 1F86B	🡬 1F86C	🡭 1F86D	🡯 1F86F	🡮 1F86E	🡸 1F878	🡺 1F87A	🡹 1F879	🡻 1F87B	🡼 1F87C	🡽 1F87D	🡿 1F87F	🡾 1F87E	⇦ 21E6
Fx	⇨ 21E8	⇧ 21E7	⇩ 21E9	⬄ 2B04	⇳ 21F3	⬁ 2B01	⬀ 2B00	⬃ 2B03	⬂ 2B02	🢬 1F8AC	🢭 1F8AD	🗶 1F5F6	✓ 2713	🗷 1F5F7	🗹 1F5F9	(Note: The character 255 (FF) represents the Windows icon (used before XP/2003, although it was never changed), which as a corporate logo has no Unicode point. Similar Unicode characters include U+1FA9F 🪟︎ WINDOW. Compare the status of the Apple logo in Mac OS Roman and Mac OS Symbol.)

=== Wingdings 2 ===
Wingdings 2
- Category: Dingbat
- Designers: Charles Bigelow; Kris Holmes
- Foundry: Type Solutions
- Date released: 1990
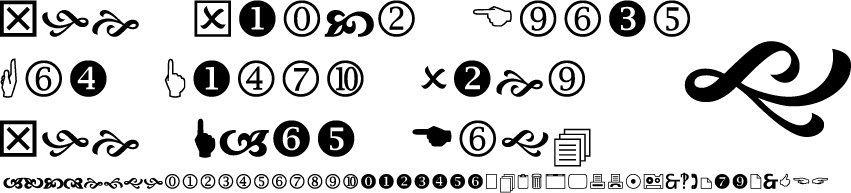
- Sample

Wingdings 2 is a TrueType font distributed with a variety of Microsoft applications, including Microsoft Office up to version 2010. The font was developed in 1990 by Type Solutions, Inc. The current copyright holder is Microsoft Corporation. Among the features of Wingdings 2 are 16 forms of the index, Enclosed Alphanumerics from 0 to 10, multiple forms of ampersand and interrobang, several geometric shapes and an asterism.

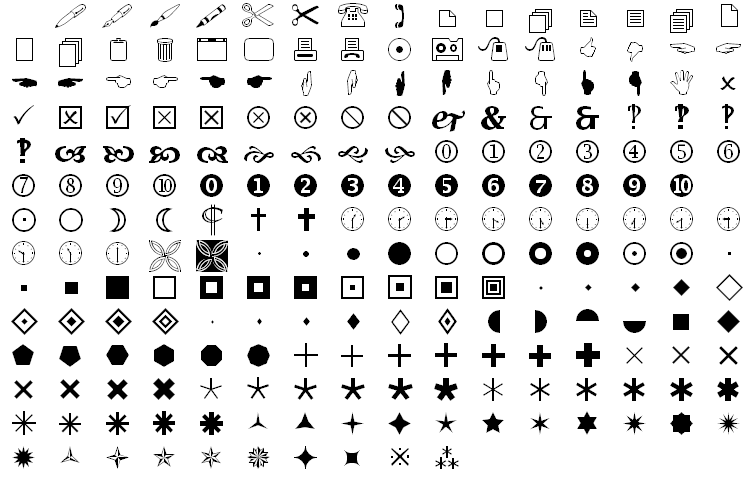
Mosaic of Wingdings 2 characters

Wingdings 2
	0	1	2	3	4	5	6	7	8	9	A	B	C	D	E	F
0x																
1x																
2x	SP	🖊 1F58A	🖋 1F58B	🖌 1F58C	🖍 1F58D	✄ 2704	✀ 2700	🕾 1F57E	🕽 1F57D	🗅 1F5C5	🗆 1F5C6	🗇 1F5C7	🗈 1F5C8	🗉 1F5C9	🗊 1F5CA	🗋 1F5CB
3x	🗌 1F5CC	🗍 1F5CD	📋︎ 1F4CB	🗑 1F5D1	🗔 1F5D4	🖵 1F5B5	🖶 1F5B6	🖷 1F5B7	🖸 1F5B8	🖭 1F5AD	🖯 1F5AF	🖱 1F5B1	🖒 1F592	🖓 1F593	🖘 1F598	🖙 1F599
4x	🖚 1F59A	🖛 1F59B	👈︎ 1F448	👉︎ 1F449	🖜 1F59C	🖝 1F59D	🖞 1F59E	🖟 1F59F	🖠 1F5A0	🖡 1F5A1	👆︎ 1F446	👇︎ 1F447	🖢 1F5A2	🖣 1F5A3	🖑 1F591	🗴 1F5F4
5x	🗸 1F5F8	🗵 1F5F5	☑ 2611	⮽ 2BBD	☒ 2612	⮾ 2BBE	⮿ 2BBF	🛇 1F6C7	⦸ 29B8	🙱 1F671	🙴 1F674	🙲 1F672	🙳 1F673	‽ 203D	🙹 1F679	🙺 1F67A
6x	🙻 1F67B	🙦 1F666	🙤 1F664	🙥 1F665	🙧 1F667	🙚 1F65A	🙘 1F658	🙙 1F659	🙛 1F65B	⓪ 24EA	① 2460	② 2461	③ 2462	④ 2463	⑤ 2464	⑥ 2465
7x	⑦ 2466	⑧ 2467	⑨ 2468	⑩ 2469	⓿ 24FF	❶ 2776	❷ 2777	❸ 2778	❹ 2779	❺ 277A	❻ 277B	❼ 277C	❽ 277D	❾ 277E	❿ 277F	
8x	☉ 2609	🌕︎ 1F315	☽ 263D	☾ 263E	⸿ 2E3F	✝ 271D	🕇 1F547	🕜︎ 1F55C	🕝︎ 1F55D	🕞︎ 1F55E	🕟︎ 1F55F	🕠︎ 1F560	🕡︎ 1F561	🕢︎ 1F562	🕣︎ 1F563	🕤︎ 1F564
9x	🕥︎ 1F565	🕦︎ 1F566	🕧︎ 1F567	🙨 1F668	🙩 1F669	⋅ 22C5	🞄 1F784	⦁ 2981	● 25CF	○ 25CB	🞅 1F785	🞇 1F787	🞉 1F789	⊙ 2299	⦿ 29BF	🞌 1F78C
Ax	🞍 1F78D	◾︎ 25FE	■ 25A0	□ 25A1	🞑 1F791	🞒 1F792	🞓 1F793	🞔 1F794	▣ 25A3	🞕 1F795	🞖 1F796	🞗 1F797	🞘 1F798	⬩ 2B29	⬥ 2B25	◇ 25C7
Bx	🞚 1F79A	◈ 25C8	🞛 1F79B	🞜 1F79C	🞝 1F79D	🞞 1F79E	⬪ 2B2A	⬧ 2B27	◊ 25CA	🞠 1F7A0	◖ 25D6	◗ 25D7	⯊ 2BCA	⯋ 2BCB	⯀ 2BC0	⯁ 2BC1
Cx	⬟ 2B1F	⯂ 2BC2	⬣ 2B23	⬢ 2B22	⯃ 2BC3	⯄ 2BC4	🞡 1F7A1	🞢 1F7A2	🞣 1F7A3	🞤 1F7A4	🞥 1F7A5	🞦 1F7A6	🞧 1F7A7	🞨 1F7A8	🞩 1F7A9	🞪 1F7AA
Dx	🞫 1F7AB	🞬 1F7AC	🞭 1F7AD	🞮 1F7AE	🞯 1F7AF	🞰 1F7B0	🞱 1F7B1	🞲 1F7B2	🞳 1F7B3	🞴 1F7B4	🞵 1F7B5	🞶 1F7B6	🞷 1F7B7	🞸 1F7B8	🞹 1F7B9	🞺 1F7BA
Ex	🞻 1F7BB	🞼 1F7BC	🞽 1F7BD	🞾 1F7BE	🞿 1F7BF	🟀 1F7C0	🟂 1F7C2	🟄 1F7C4	🟆 1F7C6	🟉 1F7C9	🟊 1F7CA	✶ 2736	🟌 1F7CC	🟎 1F7CE	🟐 1F7D0	🟒 1F7D2
Fx	✹ 2739	🟃 1F7C3	🟇 1F7C7	✯ 272F	🟍 1F7CD	🟔 1F7D4	⯌ 2BCC	⯍ 2BCD	※ 203B	⁂ 2042						

=== Wingdings 3 ===
Wingdings 3
- Category: Symbol
- Designers: Charles Bigelow; Kris Holmes
- Foundry: Type Solutions
- Date released: 1990
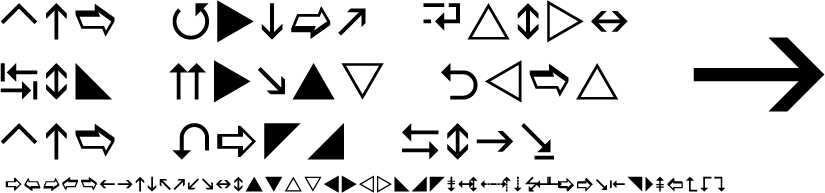
- Sample

Wingdings 3 is a TrueType dingbat font distributed with Microsoft Office (up to version 2010) and some other Microsoft products.

The font was originally developed in 1990 by Type Solutions, Inc. Since 2006, the copyright holder is Microsoft Corporation. Wingdings 3 consists almost entirely of arrow variations and includes many symbols for keytops as defined in ISO/IEC 9995-7.

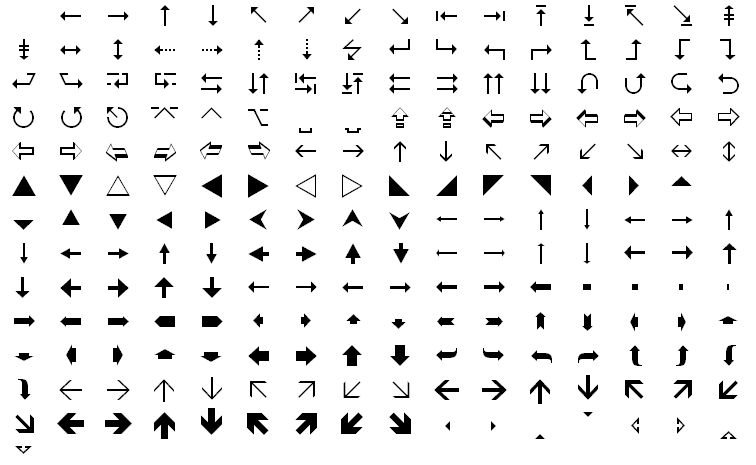
Mosaic of Wingdings 3 characters

Wingdings 3
	0	1	2	3	4	5	6	7	8	9	A	B	C	D	E	F
0x																
1x																
2x	SP	⭠ 2B60	⭢ 2B62	⭡ 2B61	⭣ 2B63	⭦ 2B66	⭧ 2B67	⭩ 2B69	⭨ 2B68	⭰ 2B70	⭲ 2B72	⭱ 2B71	⭳ 2B73	⭶ 2B76	⭸ 2B78	⭻ 2B7B
3x	⭽ 2B7D	⭤ 2B64	⭥ 2B65	⭪ 2B6A	⭬ 2B6C	⭫ 2B6B	⭭ 2B6D	⭍ 2B4D	⮠ 2BA0	⮡ 2BA1	⮢ 2BA2	⮣ 2BA3	⮤ 2BA4	⮥ 2BA5	⮦ 2BA6	⮧ 2BA7
4x	⮐ 2B90	⮑ 2B91	⮒ 2B92	⮓ 2B93	⮀ 2B80	⮃ 2B83	⭾ 2B7E	⭿ 2B7F	⮄ 2B84	⮆ 2B86	⮅ 2B85	⮇ 2B87	⮏ 2B8F	⮍ 2B8D	⮎ 2B8E	⮌ 2B8C
5x	⭮ 2B6E	⭯ 2B6F	⎋ 238B	⌤ 2324	⌃ 2303	⌥ 2325	␣ 2423	⍽ 237D	⇪ 21EA	⮸ 2BB8	🢠 1F8A0	🢡 1F8A1	🢢 1F8A2	🢣 1F8A3	🢤 1F8A4	🢥 1F8A5
6x	🢦 1F8A6	🢧 1F8A7	🢨 1F8A8	🢩 1F8A9	🢪 1F8AA	🢫 1F8AB	🡐 1F850	🡒 1F852	🡑 1F851	🡓 1F853	🡔 1F854	🡕 1F855	🡗 1F857	🡖 1F856	🡘 1F858	🡙 1F859
7x	▲25B2	▼25BC	△ 25B3	▽ 25BD	◀ 25C0	▶ 25B6	◁ 25C1	▷ 25B7	◣ 25E3	◢ 25E2	◤ 25E4	◥ 25E5	🞀 1F780	🞂 1F782	🞁 1F781	
8x	🞃 1F783	⯅ 2BC5	⯆ 2BC6	⯇ 2BC7	⯈ 2BC8	⮜ 2B9C	⮞ 2B9E	⮝ 2B9D	⮟ 2B9F	🠐 1F810	🠒 1F812	🠑 1F811	🠓 1F813	🠔 1F814	🠖 1F816	🠕 1F815
9x	🠗 1F817	🠘 1F818	🠚 1F81A	🠙 1F819	🠛 1F81B	🠜 1F81C	🠞 1F81E	🠝 1F81D	🠟 1F81F	🠀 1F800	🠂 1F802	🠁 1F801	🠃 1F803	🠄 1F804	🠆 1F806	🠅 1F805
Ax	🠇 1F807	🠈 1F808	🠊 1F80A	🠉 1F809	🠋 1F80B	🠠 1F820	🠢 1F822	🠤 1F824	🠦 1F826	🠨 1F828	🠪 1F82A	🠬 1F82C	🢜 1F89C	🢝 1F89D	🢞 1F89E	🢟 1F89F
Bx	🠮 1F82E	🠰 1F830	🠲 1F832	🠴 1F834	🠶 1F836	🠸 1F838	🠺 1F83A	🠹 1F839	🠻 1F83B	🢘 1F898	🢚 1F89A	🢙 1F899	🢛 1F89B	🠼 1F83C	🠾 1F83E	🠽 1F83D
Cx	🠿 1F83F	🡀 1F840	🡂 1F842	🡁 1F841	🡃 1F843	🡄 1F844	🡆 1F846	🡅 1F845	🡇 1F847	⮨ 2BA8	⮩ 2BA9	⮪ 2BAA	⮫ 2BAB	⮬ 2BAC	⮭ 2BAD	⮮ 2BAE
Dx	⮯ 2BAF	🡠 1F860	🡢 1F862	🡡 1F861	🡣 1F863	🡤 1F864	🡥 1F865	🡧 1F867	🡦 1F866	🡰 1F870	🡲 1F872	🡱 1F871	🡳 1F873	🡴 1F874	🡵 1F875	🡷 1F877
Ex	🡶 1F876	🢀 1F880	🢂 1F882	🢁 1F881	🢃 1F883	🢄 1F884	🢅 1F885	🢇 1F887	🢆 1F886	🢐 1F890	🢒 1F892	🢑 1F891	🢓 1F893	🢔 1F894	🢖 1F896	🢕 1F895
Fx	🢗 1F897															

== Controversy ==
"NYC" in Wingdings

In 1992, only days after the release of Windows 3.1, it was discovered that "NYC" (New York City) in Wingdings was rendered as a skull and crossbones symbol, Star of David, and thumbs up gesture. This was often said to be an antisemitic message referencing New York's large Jewish community. Microsoft strongly denied this was intentional, and insisted that the final arrangement of the glyphs in the font was largely random. "NYC" in the later-released Webdings font was intentionally rendered as an eye, heart, and city skyline, referring to the I Love New York logo.

"Q33 NY" in Wingdings

After September 11, 2001, an email was circulated claiming that "Q33 NY", which it claims is the flight number of the first plane to hit the Twin Towers, in Wingdings would bring up a character sequence of a plane flying eastwards, followed by two rectangular paper sheet icons which may be interpreted as skyscrapers, followed by the skull and crossbones symbol and the Star of David. However, the flight numbers of the airplanes that hit the towers were AA11 and UA175; the tail numbers were N334AA and N612UA.

== In popular culture ==
- In the indie video game Undertale made by Toby Fox, a hidden character known as W. D. Gaster uses the Wingdings typeface to speak. Specifically, Gaster uses it to speak during his Lab Entry #17, and on older versions of the Deltarune website.
- In a Saturday Night Live sketch in April 2024, Ryan Gosling plays Steven Wingdings, son of Wingdings' fictitious creator—Jonathan Wingdings—a dad who was always "hard to read."

== See also ==
- Dingbat
- Zapf Dingbats
- Webdings
- Unicode symbols
- Zodiac symbols
- Emoji
- Emoticon
