= Fleuron (typography) =

Printer's ornamental flourish

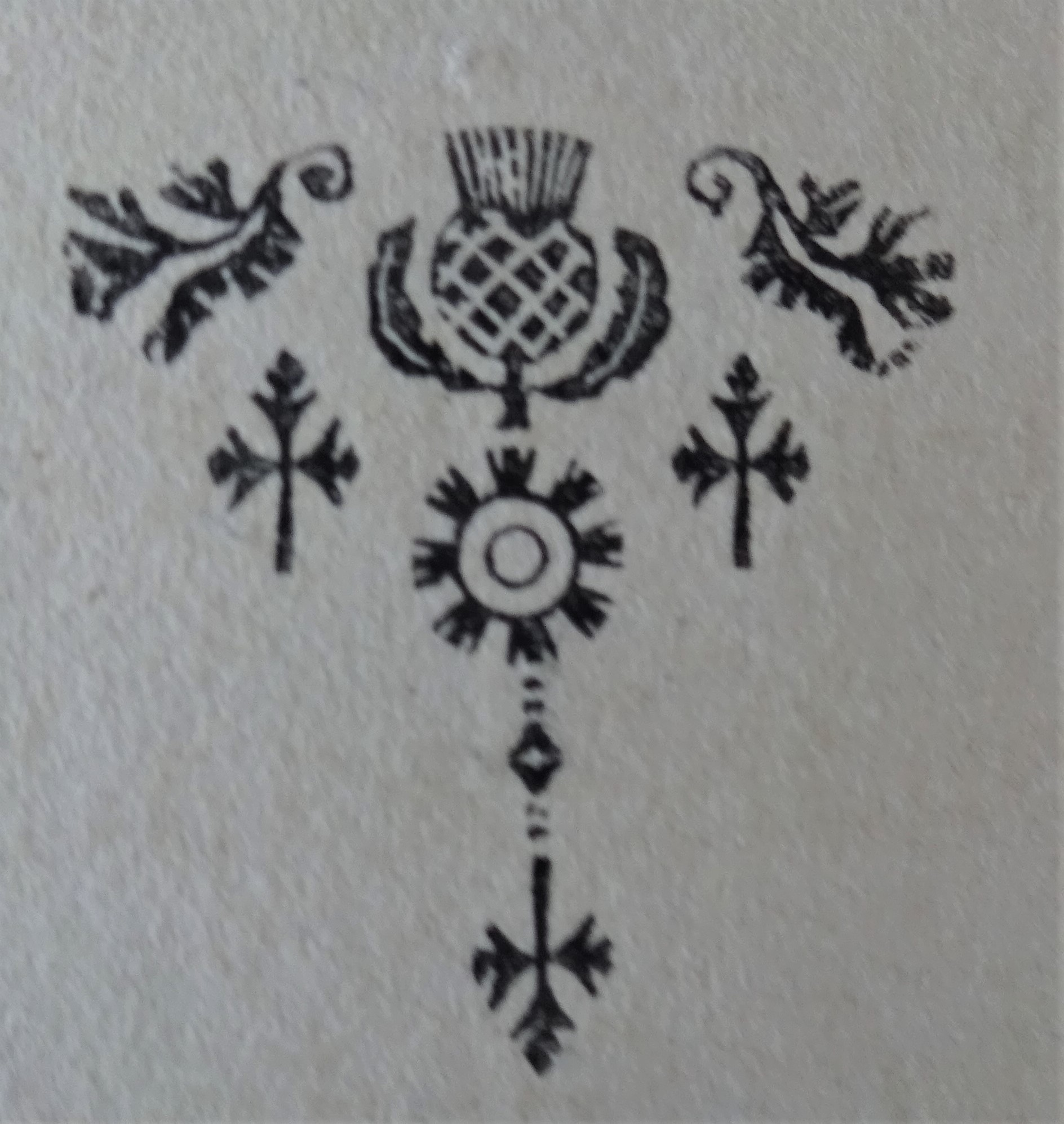
A complex fleuron with thistle from a 1870 edition of Poems, Chiefly in the Scottish Dialect

A fleuron (/ˈflʊərɒn, -ən, ˈflɜːrɒn, -ən/), also known as a printers' flower, is a typographical symbol, or glyph, used either as a punctuation mark or as an ornament for typographic compositions. Fleurons are stylized forms of flowers or leaves; the term derives from the Old French: floron ('flower'). Robert Bringhurst in The Elements of Typographic Style calls the forms "horticultural dingbats". A commonly encountered fleuron is the ❦, the floral heart or hedera (ivy leaf), also known as an aldus leaf after Italian Renaissance printer Aldus Manutius.

== History ==
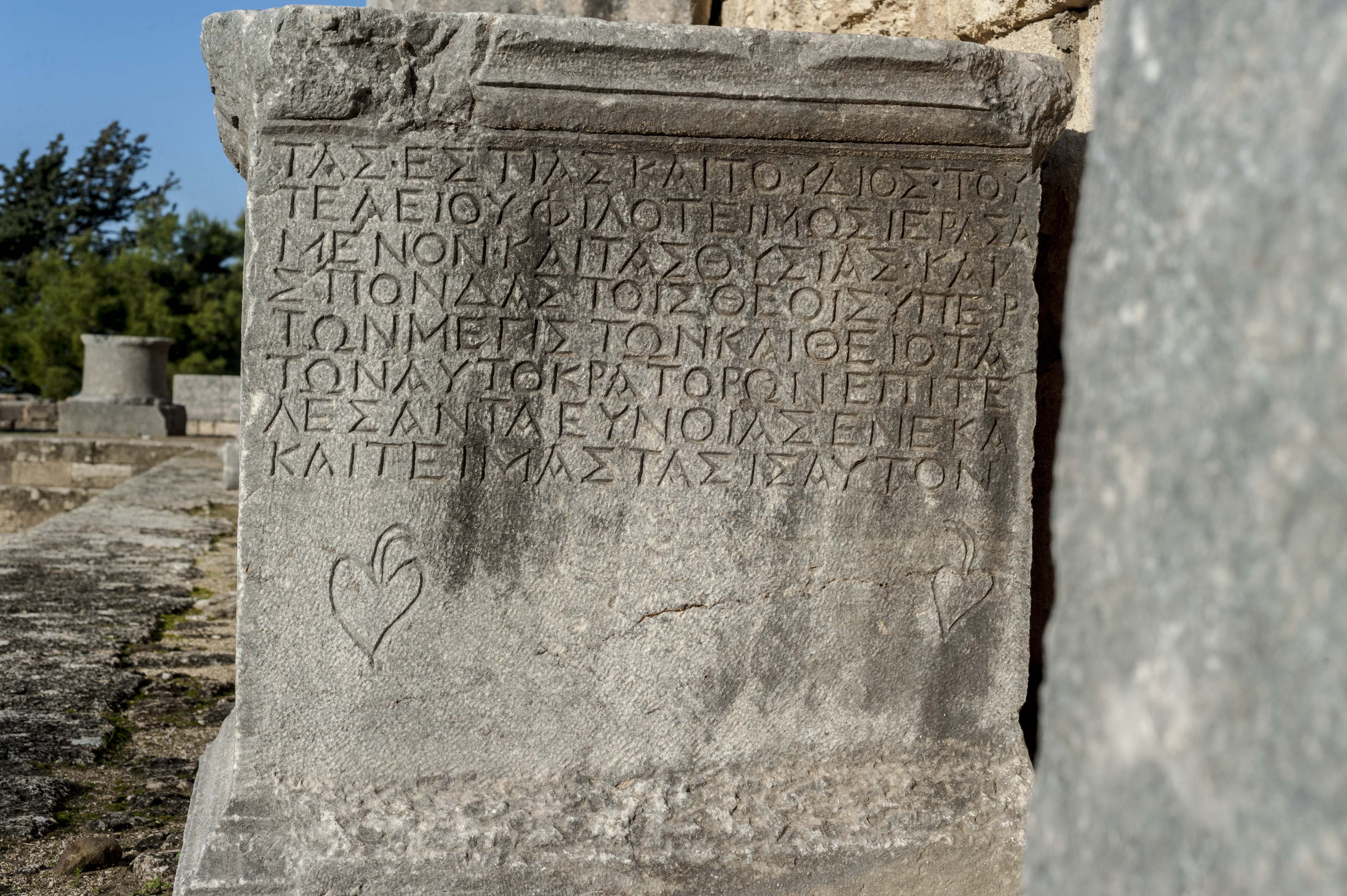
Τypographic ornament in the ancient city of Kamiros on Rhodes, Greece

Flower decorations are among the oldest typographic ornaments. A fleuron can also be used to fill the white space that results from the indentation of the first line of a paragraph, on a line by itself to divide paragraphs in a highly stylized way, to divide lists, or for pure ornamentation. The fleuron (as a formal glyph) is a sixteenth century introduction.

Fleurons were crafted the same way as other typographic elements were: as individual metal sorts that could be fit into the printer's compositions alongside letters and numbers. This saved the printer time and effort in producing ornamentation. Because the sorts could be produced in multiples, printers could build up borders with repeating patterns of fleurons.

== Fleurons in Unicode ==
Thirty forms of fleuron have code points in Unicode. The Dingbats and Miscellaneous Symbols blocks have three fleurons that the standard calls "floral hearts" (also called "aldus leaf", "ivy leaf", "hedera" and "vine leaf"); twenty-four fleurons (from the pre-Unicode Wingdings and Wingdings 2 fonts) in the Ornamental Dingbats block and three more fleurons used in archaic languages are also encoded. (The form of these symbols may vary by computer font; the forms shown here are representative glyphs.)

- U+2619 ☙ REVERSED ROTATED FLORAL HEART BULLET (Miscellaneous Symbols)
- U+2766 ❦ FLORAL HEART (Dingbats)
- U+2767 ❧ ROTATED FLORAL HEART BULLET (Dingbats)
- U+10877 𐡷 PALMYRENE LEFT-POINTING FLEURON
- U+10878 𐡸 PALMYRENE RIGHT-POINTING FLEURON
- U+10AF1 𐫱 MANICHAEAN PUNCTUATION FLEURON
- U+1F650 🙐 NORTH WEST POINTING LEAF (Ornamental Dingbats)
- U+1F651 🙑 SOUTH WEST POINTING LEAF
- U+1F652 🙒 NORTH EAST POINTING LEAF
- U+1F653 🙓 SOUTH EAST POINTING LEAF
- U+1F654 🙔 TURNED NORTH WEST POINTING LEAF
- U+1F655 🙕 TURNED SOUTH WEST POINTING LEAF
- U+1F656 🙖 TURNED NORTH EAST POINTING LEAF
- U+1F657 🙗 TURNED SOUTH EAST POINTING LEAF
- U+1F658 🙘 NORTH WEST POINTING VINE LEAF
- U+1F659 🙙 SOUTH WEST POINTING VINE LEAF
- U+1F65A 🙚 NORTH EAST POINTING VINE LEAF
- U+1F65B 🙛 SOUTH EAST POINTING VINE LEAF
- U+1F65C 🙜 HEAVY NORTH WEST POINTING VINE LEAF
- U+1F65D 🙝 HEAVY SOUTH WEST POINTING VINE LEAF
- U+1F65E 🙞 HEAVY NORTH EAST POINTING VINE LEAF
- U+1F65F 🙟 HEAVY SOUTH EAST POINTING VINE LEAF
- U+1F660 🙠 NORTH WEST POINTING BUD
- U+1F661 🙡 SOUTH WEST POINTING BUD
- U+1F662 🙢 NORTH EAST POINTING BUD
- U+1F663 🙣 SOUTH EAST POINTING BUD
- U+1F664 🙤 HEAVY NORTH WEST POINTING BUD
- U+1F665 🙥 HEAVY SOUTH WEST POINTING BUD
- U+1F666 🙦 HEAVY NORTH EAST POINTING BUD
- U+1F667 🙧 HEAVY SOUTH EAST POINTING BUD

Unicode also considers the following seven glyphs as fleurons:

- U+273E ✾ SIX PETALLED BLACK AND WHITE FLORETTE (Dingbats)
- U+273F ✿ BLACK FLORETTE (Dingbats)
- U+2740 ❀ WHITE FLORETTE (Dingbats)
  - U+1F3F5 🏵 ROSETTE (Miscellaneous Symbols and Pictographs)
  - U+1F4AE 💮 WHITE FLOWER (Miscellaneous Symbols and Pictographs)
- U+2741 ❁ EIGHT PETALLED OUTLINED BLACK FLORETTE (Dingbats)
  - U+1F3F6 🏶 BLACK ROSETTE (Miscellaneous Symbols and Pictographs)

== Gallery ==
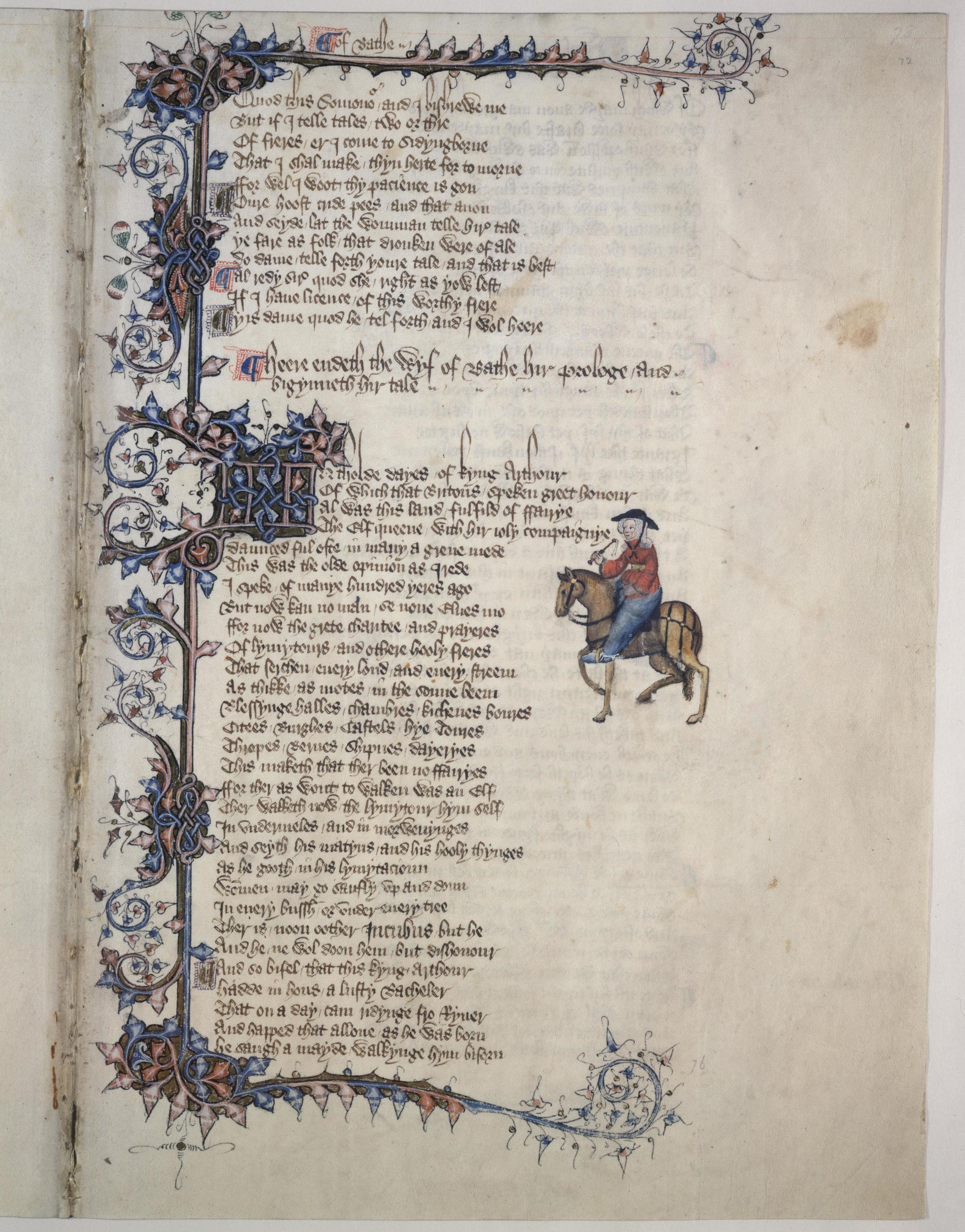
Decorated page from Chaucer's Canterbury Tales: The Wife of Bath's Tale

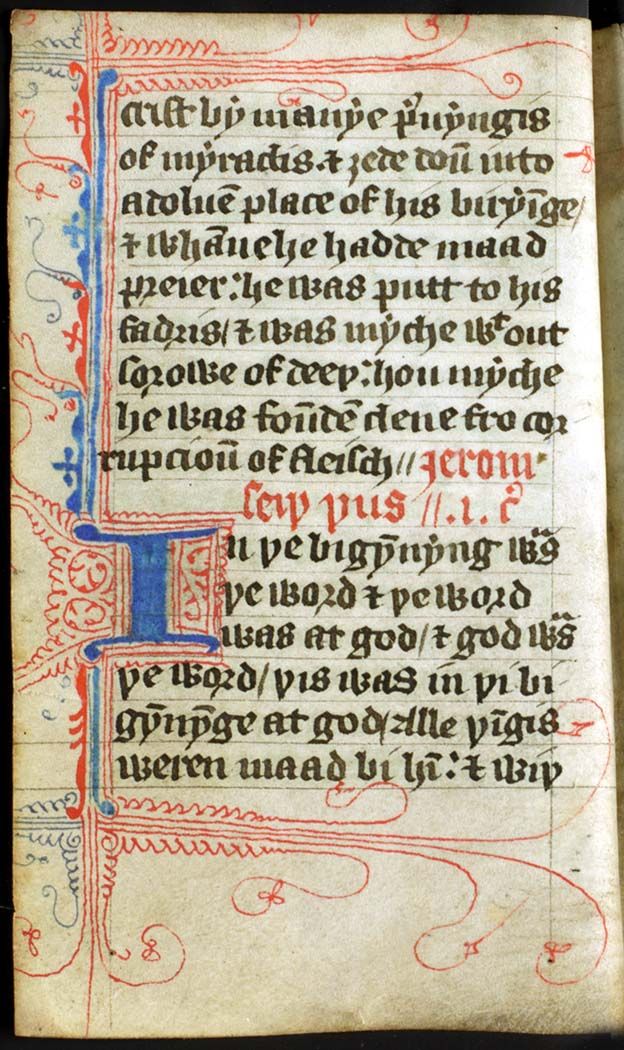
John Wycliffe's handwritten Bible, late 14th century

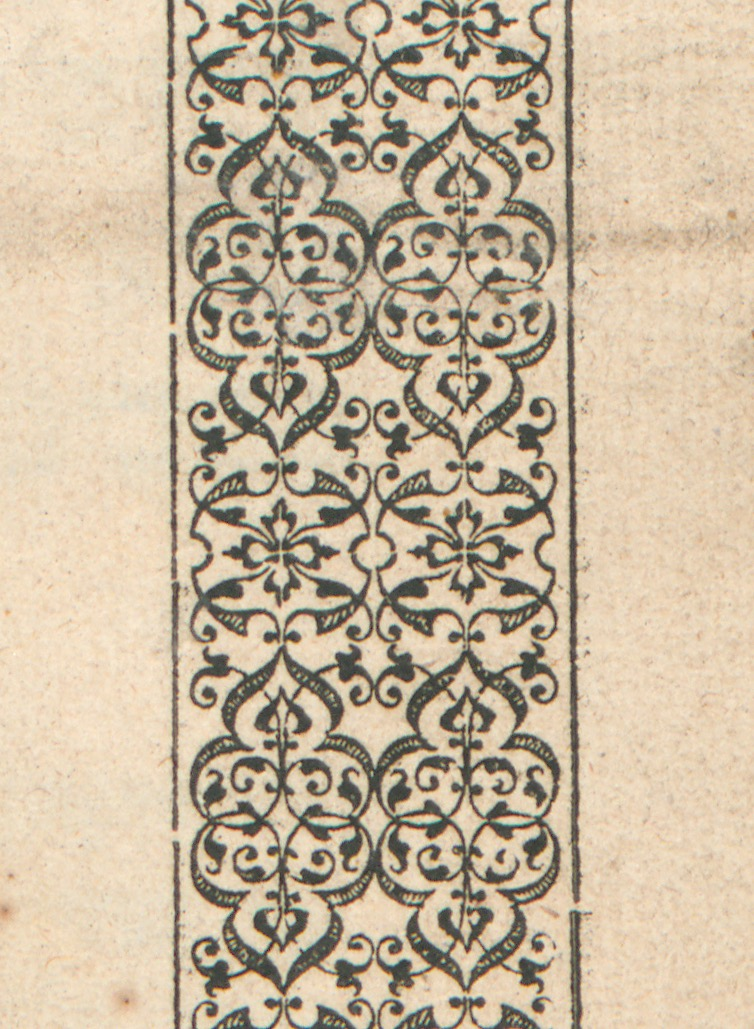
Fleuron by Robert Granjon, who pioneered the style, printed 1567

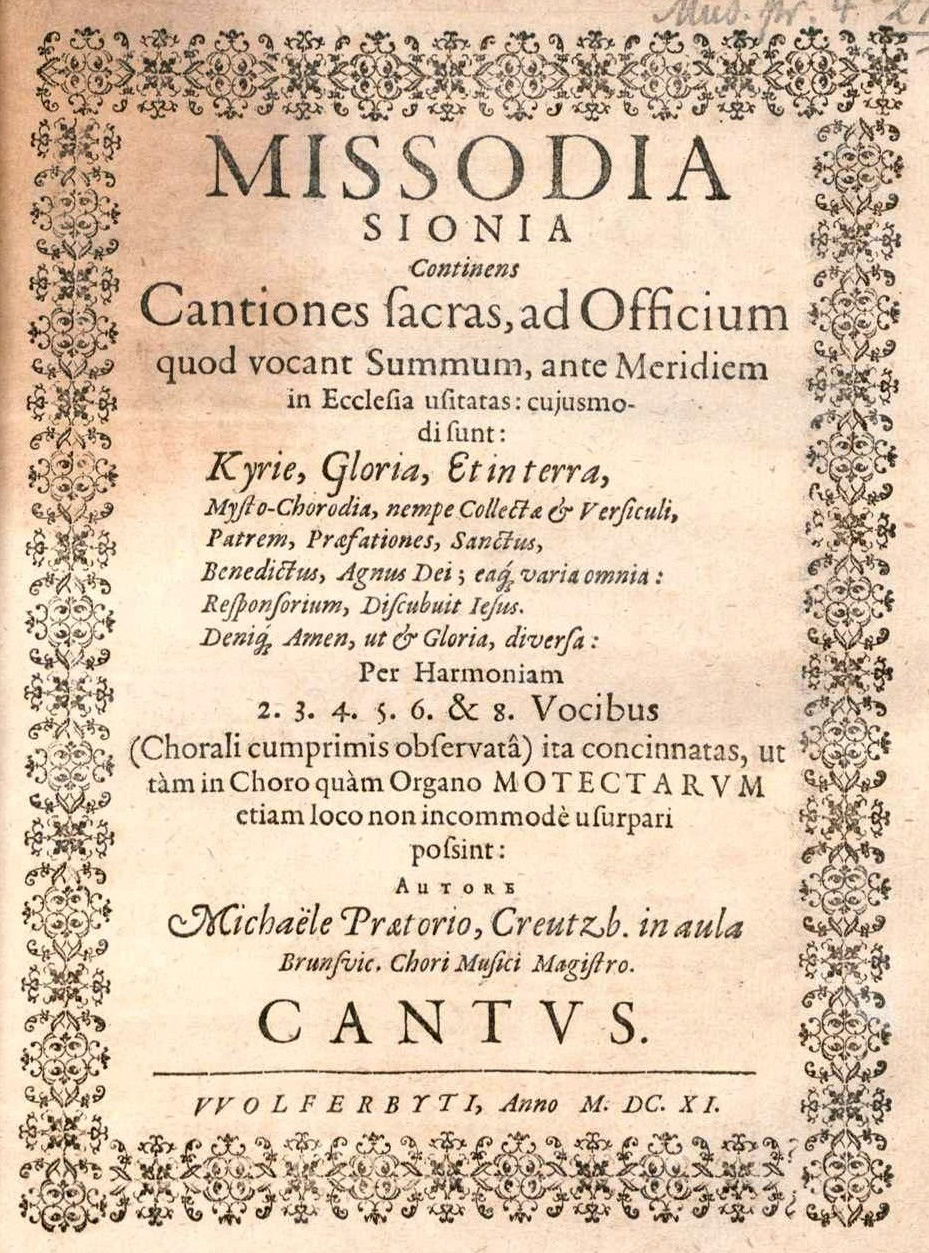
The arabesque title page of a 1611 book

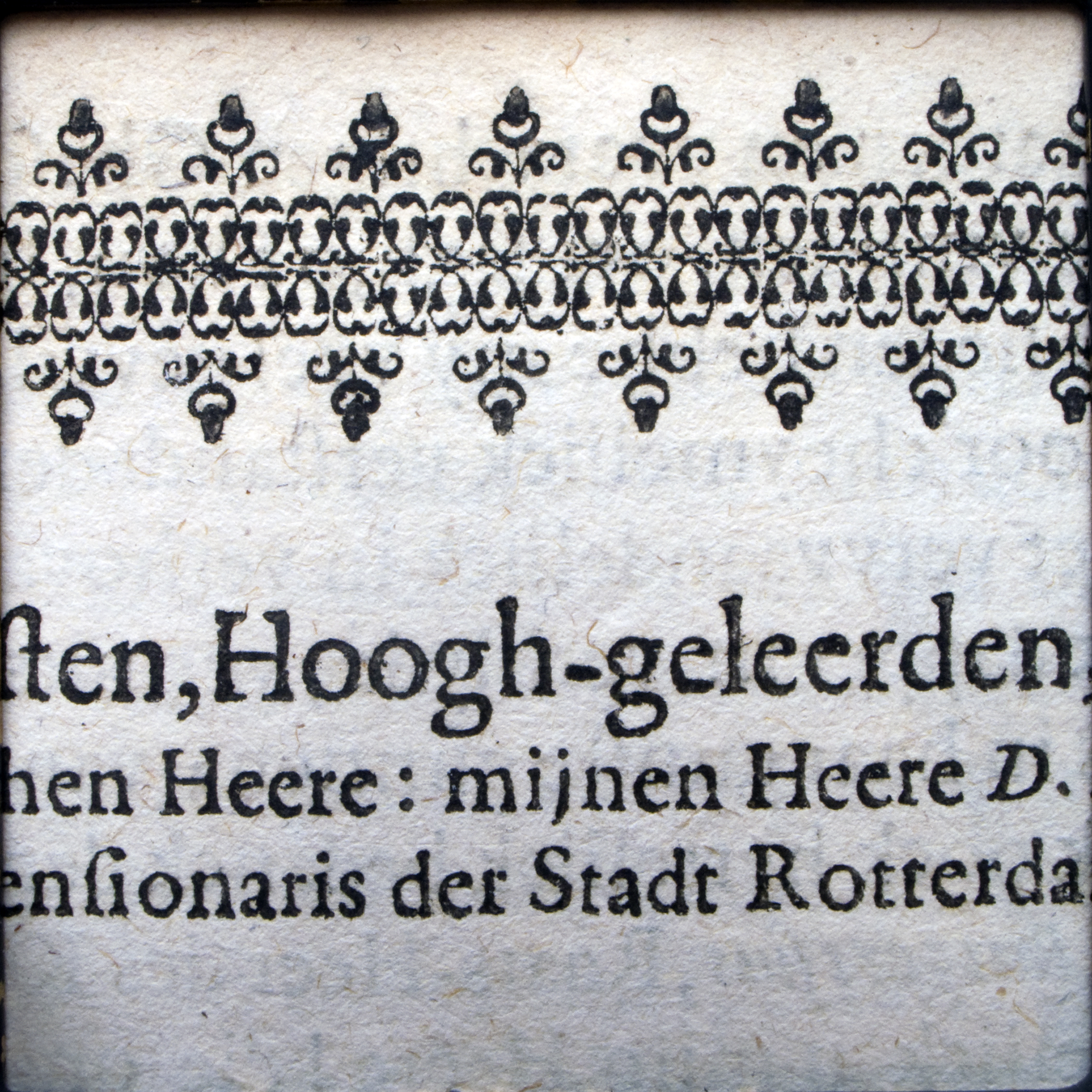
Detail of a printed arabesque border in a 1616 book

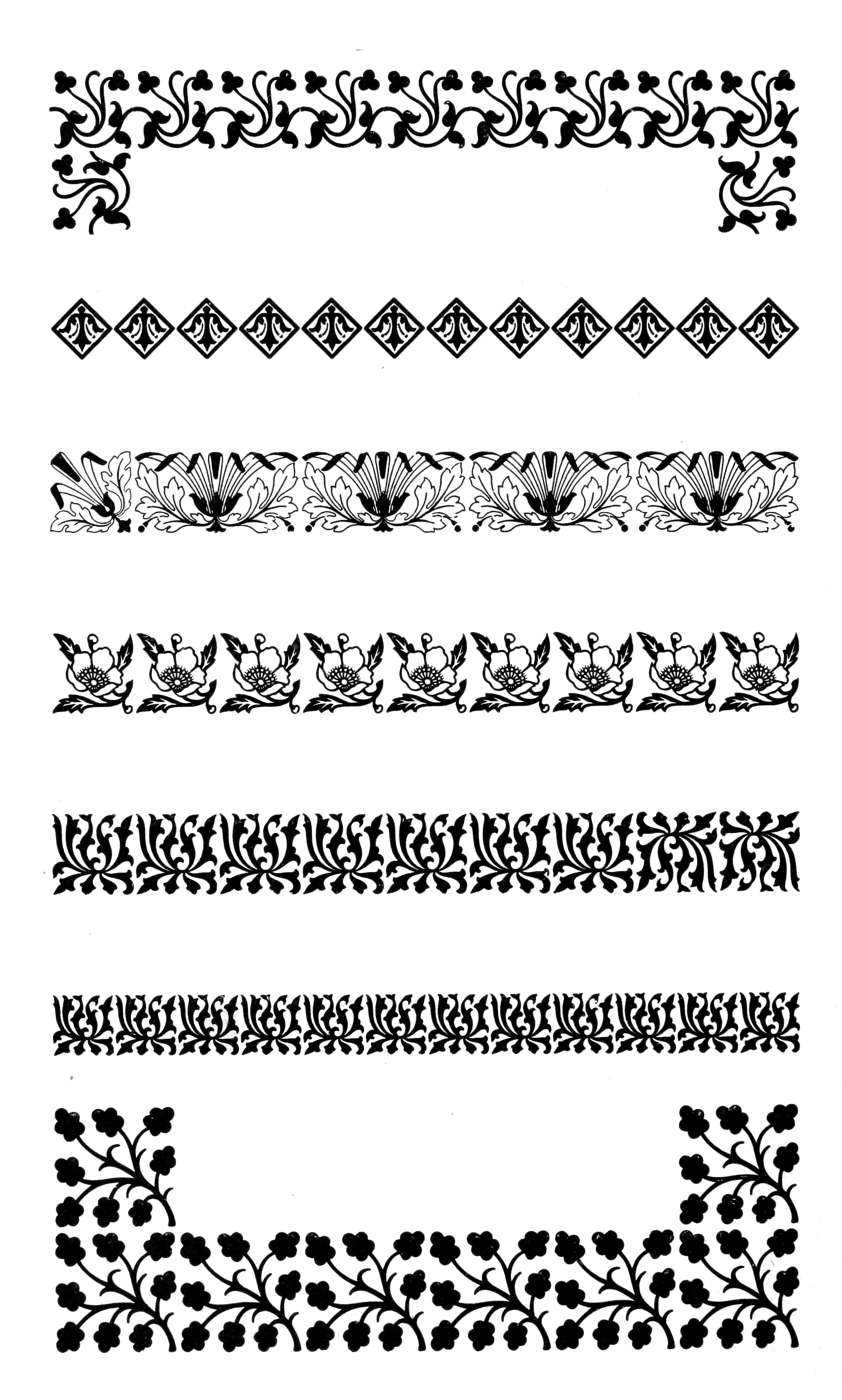
Specimens of printed floral borders from an 1897 type foundry specimen book

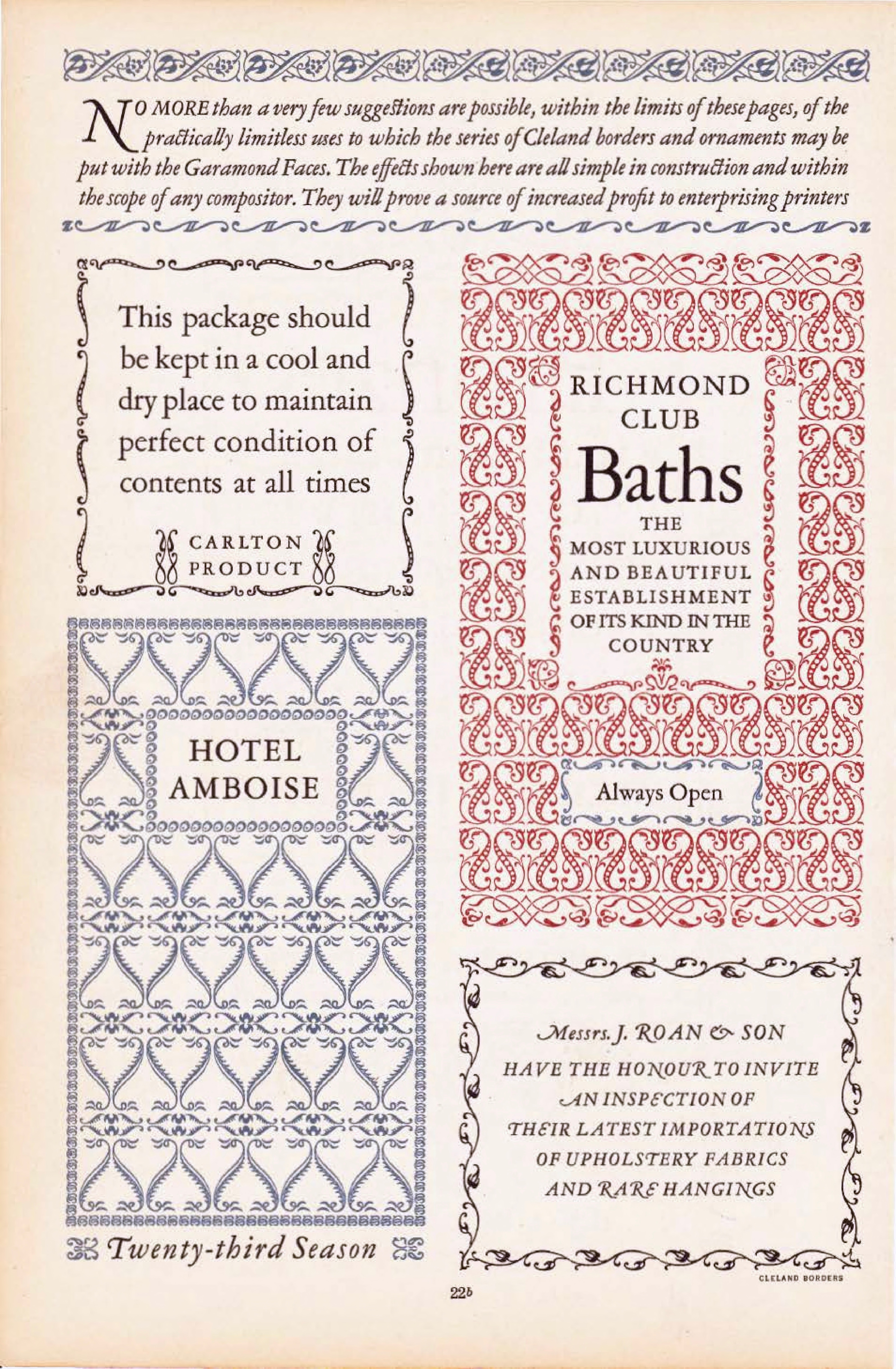
Ornamented borders by Thomas Maitland Cleland, 1923

Example fleuron glyphs from a digital font

== See also ==
- Asterism (typography) – Triangular symbol of three asterisks (U+2042 ⁂ ASTERISM}
- Dingbat, also known as a printer's ornament – Typographic symbol class
- Dinkus – Typographic device ( * * * ) to indicate a change, mostly used as a sub-chapter section break. Although a group of asterisks is the most common style, fleurons are also seen fulfilling this role.
- The Fleuron, a British typography magazine from the early 20th century.
- ❦ (Garden of England), a track from English indie rock band Alt-J's album This Is All Yours.
