= Interrobang =

Combined question mark and exclamation mark

‽ ⸘o

Interrobang
- In Unicode: U+203D ‽ INTERROBANG; U+2E18 ⸘ INVERTED INTERROBANG

The interrobang, (Note: /ɪnˈtɛrəbæŋ/) ‽, also known as the interabang, is a punctuation mark intended to combine the functions of the question mark (also known as the interrogative point) and the exclamation mark (also known in the jargon of printers as a "bang"). The glyph is a combination of those two marks and was first proposed in 1962 by Martin K. Speckter.

Other rejected names for the interrobang were the "emphaquest," "interropoint" or "exclarogative".

== Application ==
A sentence ending with an interrobang states a question in an excited manner, expresses excitement, disbelief, or confusion in the form of a question, or asks a rhetorical question.

For example:

- You call that a hat‽
- Are you out of your mind‽
- Are you a dummy‽

Writers using informal language may use several alternating question marks and exclamation marks for even more emphasis. However, this is regarded as poor style in formal writing.

== History ==
An interrobang in the Palatino Linotype font

Historically, writers have used multiple consecutive punctuation marks to end a sentence expressing both surprise and question.

What the...?! Neves, Called Dead in Fall, Denies It

— headline from San Francisco Examiner, May 9, 1936

=== Invention ===
American Martin K. Speckter (June 14, 1915 – February 14, 1988) conceptualized the interrobang in 1962. As the head of an advertising agency, Speckter believed that advertisements would look better if copywriters conveyed surprised rhetorical questions using a single mark. He proposed the concept of a single punctuation mark in an article in the magazine TYPEtalks. Speckter solicited possible names for the new character from readers. Contenders included exclamaquest, and exclarotive, but he settled on interrobang. He chose the name to reference the punctuation marks that inspired it: interrogatio is Latin for "rhetorical question" or "cross-examination"; bang is printers' slang for the exclamation mark. Graphic treatments for the new mark were also submitted in response to the article.

=== Early interest ===
In 1965, Richard Isbell created the Americana typeface for American Type Founders and included the interrobang as one of the characters. In 1968, an interrobang key was available on some Remington typewriters. In the 1970s, replacement interrobang keycaps and typefaces were available for some Smith-Corona typewriters. The interrobang was in vogue for much of the 1960s; the word interrobang appeared in some dictionaries, and the mark was used in some magazine and newspaper articles.

=== Continued support ===
Most fonts do not include the interrobang, but it has not disappeared. Lucida Grande, the default font for many UI elements of legacy versions of Apple's OS X operating system, includes the interrobang, and Microsoft provides several versions of the interrobang in the Wingdings 2 character set (on the right bracket and tilde keys on US keyboard layouts), included with Microsoft Office. It was accepted into Unicode and is included in several fonts, including Lucida Sans Unicode, Arial Unicode MS, and Calibri, the default font in the Office 2007, 2010, and 2013 suites.

== Upside-down interrobang ==
An upside-down interrobang (⸘), combining ¿ and ¡, suitable for starting phrases in Spanish, Galician, and Asturian—which use inverted question and exclamation marks—is called an "inverted interrobang" or, rarely, a gnaborretni (interrobang spelled backwards). In current practice, interrobang-like emphatic ambiguity in Hispanic languages is usually achieved by including both sets of punctuation marks, one inside the other: (¿¡De verdad!? or ¡¿De verdad?! [Really!?]). Older usage, still official but not widespread, recommended mixing the punctuation marks: ¡Verdad? or ¿Verdad!

== Codepoint ==
The symbol is encoded in Unicode's General Punctuation block at codepoint U+203D ‽ INTERROBANG.

Unicode encodes these variants:

- U+2048 ⁈ QUESTION EXCLAMATION MARK
- U+2049 ⁉ EXCLAMATION QUESTION MARK
  - ⁉️ with an emoji variation selector
- U+2E18 ⸘ INVERTED INTERROBANG
- U+1F679 🙹 HEAVY INTERROBANG ORNAMENT
- U+1F67A 🙺 SANS-SERIF INTERROBANG ORNAMENT
- U+1F67B 🙻 HEAVY SANS-SERIF INTERROBANG ORNAMENT

== Examples of use ==
- The State Library of New South Wales, in Australia, uses an interrobang as its logo, as did the educational publishing company Pearson, which thus intends to convey "the excitement and fun of learning".
- The logo of the National Endowment for the Humanities incorporates eight exclamation marks and eight question marks; although their main strokes are separate, they all share the same dot, as in some variants of interrobangs.
- Chief Judge Frank H. Easterbrook used an interrobang in the 2012 United States Seventh Circuit opinion Robert F. Booth Trust v. Crowley.
- Australian Federal Court Justice Michael Wigney used an interrobang in the first paragraph of his 2018 judgment in Faruqi v Latham [2018] FCA 1328 (defamation proceedings between former Federal Opposition Leader Mark Latham and political campaigner and writer Osman Faruqi).
- In chess, an interrobang is used to represent a dubious move, one that is questionable but possibly has merits. (See also the evaluation symbols ?! (dubious move) and !? (interesting move).)

== See also ==
- Inverted question and exclamation marks – Punctuation marks (¿ and ¡)
- Percontation point – Mark (⸮) for a rhetorical question
