= Ampersand =

Symbol representing the word "and" (&)

- &

Usage
- Writing system: Latin script
- Type: Logographic and Ideographic
- Language of origin: Latin language
- In Unicode: U+0026
- Lexicographic position: (27)

History
- Development: 𐌄𐌕: ET; et; &
- Time period: c. 100 CE to present
- Descendants: • ⅋
- Sisters: Greek letter ϗ (ligature of κ, α and ι similarly to &); Armenian letter և (ligature of ե and ւ, pronounced /jɛv/; եւ is the Armenian word for "and"); Sindhi letter, ۽
- Transliterations: plus sign, +

Other
- Associated graphs: &c.
- Writing direction: Left-to-right

The ampersand, also known as the and sign, is the logogram &, representing the conjunction "and". It originated as a ligature of the word et (Latin for 'and').

== Etymology ==
Ampersand: the sign & the name being a corruption of 'and per se = and'; i.e. '& by itself = and'. The sign derives from the scribes' ligature for the Latin: et in certain italic versions, the letters e and t are clearly distinguishable.

— Geoffrey Glaister, Glossary of the Book

Traditionally in English, when spelling aloud, any letter that could also be used as a word in itself ("A", "I", and "O") was referred to by the Latin expression per se (by itself), as in "per se A" or "A per se A". The character &, when used by itself as opposed to more extended forms such as &c., was similarly referred to as "and per se and". This last phrase was routinely slurred to "ampersand", and the term had entered common English usage by 1837.

It has been falsely claimed that André-Marie Ampère used the symbol in his widely read publications and that people began calling the new shape "Ampère's and".

== History ==
Evolution of the ampersand, figures 1 to 6

Et ligature in Insular script

The modern ampersand is virtually identical to that of the Carolingian minuscule. The italic ampersand, to the right, is originally a later et-ligature

The ampersand can be traced back to the 1st century CE and the old Roman cursive, in which the letters E and T occasionally were written together to form a ligature (Evolution of the ampersand – figure 1). In the later and more flowing New Roman Cursive, ligatures of all kinds were extremely common; figures 2 and 3 from the middle of 4th century are examples of how the et-ligature could look in this script. During the later development of the Latin script leading up to Carolingian minuscule (9th century) the use of ligatures in general diminished. The et-ligature, however, continued to be used and gradually became more stylized and less revealing of its origin (figures 4–6).

The modern italic type ampersand is a kind of "et" ligature that goes back to the cursive scripts developed during the Renaissance. After the advent of printing in Europe in 1455, printers made extensive use of both the italic and Roman ampersands. Since the ampersand's roots go back to Roman times, many languages that use a variation of the Latin alphabet make use of it.

The ampersand often appeared as a character at the end of the Latin alphabet, as for example in Byrhtferð's list of letters from 1011.

Similarly, & was regarded as the 27th letter of the English alphabet, as taught to children in the US and elsewhere. An example may be seen in the M. B. Moore book The Dixie Primer, for the Little Folks (1863).

In her novel Adam Bede (1859), George Eliot refers to this when she makes Jacob Storey say: "He thought [Z] had only been put to finish off th' alphabet like; though ampusand would ha' done as well, for what he could see."

The popular nursery rhyme Apple Pie ABC finishes with the lines: "X, Y, Z, and ampersand, All wished for a piece in hand."

== Similar characters ==
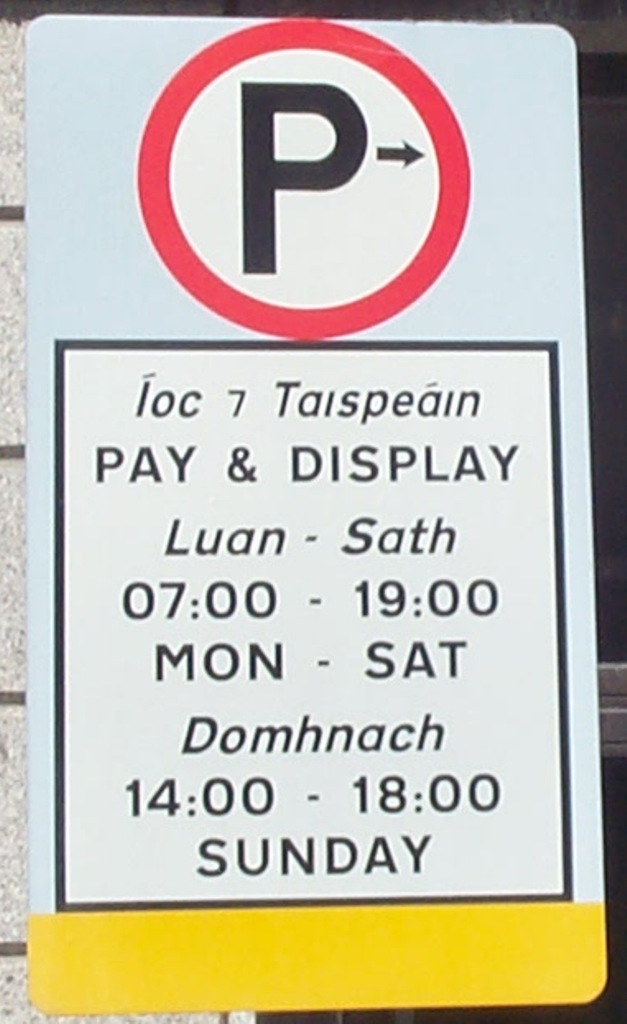
Bilingual Irish street sign, with ⁊ used to represent agus (first line) and & used to represent and (second line)

In the Irish and Scottish Gaelic languages, the character ⁊ (U+204A ⁊ TIRONIAN SIGN ET) is equivalent to the ampersand in English. This character is a survival of Tironian notes, a medieval shorthand system. This character is known as the Tironian Et in English, the agus in Irish, and the agusan in Scottish Gaelic.

In Swedish, o̱ is frequently used as a substitute for &, particularly in handwriting and in prose.

The logical conjunction symbol, ∧, is often pronounced "and", but expresses a precise logical relationship between two items rather than the loose association usually associated with an ampersand.

== Writing the ampersand ==
In everyday handwriting, the ampersand is sometimes simplified in design as a large lowercase epsilon Ɛ superimposed with a vertical line. The ampersand is also sometimes shown as an epsilon with a vertical line above and below it or a dot above and below it.

The plus sign + (itself based on an et-ligature) is often informally used in place of an ampersand, sometimes with an added loop and resembling ɬ. Other times it is a single stroke with a diagonal line connecting the bottom to the left side. This was a version of shorthand for ampersand; the stroke economy of this version provided ease of writing for workers while also assuring the character was distinct from other numeric or alphabetic symbols.

An ampersand written with a vertical stroke and a handwritten plus sign used to mean "and"

An ampersand written with a dot above and below the epsilon

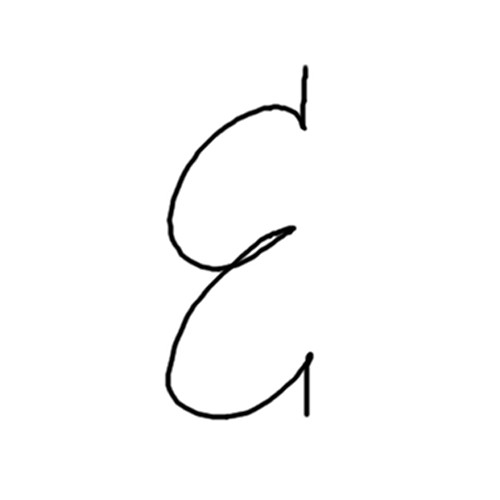
An ampersand written with the vertical stroke merged into the edges

== Usage ==
Ampersands are commonly seen in business names formed from a partnership of two or more people, such as Johnson & Johnson, Dolce & Gabbana, Marks & Spencer and Tiffany & Co, as well as some abbreviations containing the word and, such as AT&T (American Telephone and Telegraph), A&P (supermarkets), P&O (originally "Peninsular and Oriental", shipping and logistics company), R&D (research and development), D&B (drum and bass), D&D (Dungeons & Dragons), R&B (rhythm and blues), B&B (bed and breakfast), and P&L (profit and loss).

In film credits for stories, screenplays, etc., & indicates a closer collaboration than and. The ampersand is used by the Writers Guild of America to denote two writers collaborating on a specific script, rather than one writer rewriting another's work. In screenplays, two authors joined with & collaborated on the script, while two authors joined with and worked on the script at different times and may not have consulted each other at all. In the latter case, they both contributed enough significant material to the screenplay to receive credit but did not work together. As a result, both & and and may appear in the same credit, as appropriate to how the writing proceeded.

In APA style, the ampersand is used when citing sources in text such as (Jones & Jones, 2005). In the list of references, an ampersand precedes the last author's name when there is more than one author. (This does not apply to MLA style, which calls for the "and" to be spelled.)

The phrase et cetera ("and the rest"), usually written as etc. can be abbreviated &c. representing the combination et + c(etera).

The ampersand can be used to indicate that the "and" in a listed item is a part of the item's name and not a separator (e.g. "Rock, pop, rhythm & blues and hip hop").

The ampersand may still be used as an abbreviation for "and" in informal writing regardless of how "and" is used.

== Computing ==
=== Encoding and display ===
The character exists in many computer character sets, usually at 38 (26_{hex}) from ASCII. Unicode provides the following variants:

- U+0026 & AMPERSAND (&amp;, &AMP;) (The representative glyph shown here is the system default one for the ampersand grapheme and its appearance may differ according to the reader's system. The glyph provided for this grapheme in any given typeface (or computer font) is the type designer's choice.)
- U+FE60 ﹠ SMALL AMPERSAND (fullwidth CJK ideograph for East Asian typography)
- U+FF06 ＆ FULLWIDTH AMPERSAND (in block Halfwidth and Fullwidth Forms)
- U+214B ⅋ TURNED AMPERSAND (in block Letterlike Symbols)
- U+1F670 🙰 SCRIPT LIGATURE ET ORNAMENT
- U+1F671 🙱 HEAVY SCRIPT LIGATURE ET ORNAMENT
- U+1F672 🙲 LIGATURE OPEN ET ORNAMENT
- U+1F673 🙳 HEAVY LIGATURE OPEN ET ORNAMENT
- U+1F674 🙴 HEAVY AMPERSAND ORNAMENT
- U+1F675 🙵 SWASH AMPERSAND ORNAMENT

The last six of these are carryovers from the Wingdings fonts, and are meant only for backward compatibility with those fonts.

On the QWERTY keyboard layout, the ampersand is ⇧ Shift+7. It is almost always available on keyboard layouts, sometimes on ⇧ Shift+6 or ⇧ Shift+8. On the AZERTY keyboard layout, & is an unmodified keystroke, positioned above A.

=== Programming languages ===
In the 20th century, following the development of formal logic, the ampersand became a commonly used logical notation for the binary operator or sentential connective AND. This usage was adopted in computing.

Many languages with syntax derived from C, including C++, Perl, and more differentiate between:

- & for bitwise AND (4 & 2) is zero, (4 & 5) is 4.
- && for short-circuit logical AND (4 && 2) is true. (Note: This is different from Java, where the && operator is exclusively used on Boolean types.)

In C, C++, Rust and Go, a prefix & is a unary operator denoting the address in memory of the operand, e.g. &x, &func, &a[3].

In C++ and PHP, unary prefix & before a formal parameter of a function denotes pass-by-reference.

In Pascal, the & as the first character of an identifier prevents the compiler from treating it as a keyword, thus escaping it.

In Fortran, the ampersand forces the compiler to treat two lines as one. This is accomplished by placing an ampersand at the end of the first line and at the beginning of the second line.

In many implementations of ALGOL 60 the ampersand denotes the tens exponent of a real number.

In Common Lisp, the ampersand is the prefix for lambda list keywords.

Ampersand is the string concatenation operator in many BASIC dialects, AppleScript, Lingo, HyperTalk, and FileMaker. In Ada it applies to all one-dimensional arrays, not just strings.

BASIC-PLUS on the DEC PDP-11 uses the ampersand as a short form of the verb PRINT.

Applesoft BASIC used the ampersand as an internal command, not intended to be used for general programming, that invoked a machine language program in the computer's ROM.

In some versions of BASIC, unary suffix & denotes a variable is of type long, or 32 bits in length.

The ampersand was occasionally used as a prefix to denote a hexadecimal number, such as &FF for decimal 255, for instance in BBC BASIC. (The modern convention is to use "x" as a prefix to denote hexadecimal, thus xFF.) Some other languages, such as the Monitor built into ROM on the Commodore 128, used it to indicate octal instead, a convention that spread throughout the Commodore community and is now used in the VICE emulator.

In MySQL, & has dual roles. As well as a logical AND, it serves as the bitwise operator of an intersection between elements.

Dyalog APL uses ampersand similarly to Unix shells, spawning a separate green thread upon application of a function.

In more recent years, the ampersand has made its way into the Haskell standard library, representing flipped function application: x & f means the same thing as f x.

Perl uses the ampersand as a sigil to refer to subroutines:

- In Perl 4 and earlier, it was effectively required to call user-defined subroutines
- In Perl 5, it can still be used to modify the way user-defined subroutines are called
- In Raku (formerly known as Perl 6), the ampersand sigil is only used when referring to a subroutine as an object, never when calling it

In the Xbase family of languages, which includes dBase and FoxPro, a single ampersand signifies macro substitution (where elements of program code are stored in a variable for evaluation at run time). A pair of consecutive ampersands marks the start of an in-line comment.

In MASM 80x86 Assembly Language, & is the Substitution Operator, which tells the assembler to replace a macro parameter or text macro name with its actual value.

Ampersand is the name of a reactive programming language, which uses relation algebra to specify information systems.

=== Text markup ===
In SGML, XML, and HTML, the ampersand is used to introduce an SGML entity, such as &nbsp; (for non-breaking space) or &alpha; (for the Greek letter α). The HTML and XML encoding for the ampersand character is the entity &amp;. This can create a problem known as delimiter collision when converting text into one of these markup languages. For instance, when putting URLs or other material containing ampersands into XML format files such as RSS files the & must be replaced with &amp; or they are considered not well formed, and computers will be unable to read the files correctly. SGML derived the use from IBM Generalized Markup Language, which was one of many IBM-mainframe languages to use the ampersand to signal a text substitution, eventually going back to System/360 macro assembly language.

In the plain TeX markup language, the ampersand is used to mark tabstops. The ampersand itself can be applied in TeX with \&. The Computer Modern fonts replace it with an "E.T." symbol in the cmti# (text italic) fonts, so it can be entered as {\it\&} in running text when using the default (Computer Modern) fonts.

In Microsoft Windows menus, labels, and other captions, the ampersand is used to denote the next letter as a keyboard shortcut (called an "Access key" by Microsoft). For instance setting a button label to "&Print" makes it display as Print and for Alt+P to be a shortcut equivalent to pressing that button. A double ampersand is needed in order to display a real ampersand. This convention originated in the first WIN32 api, and is used in Windows Forms, (but not WPF, which uses underscore _ for this purpose) and is also copied into many other toolkits on multiple operating systems. Sometimes this causes problems similar to other programs that fail to sanitize markup from user input, for instance Navision databases have trouble if this character is in either "Text" or "Code" fields.

=== Unix shells ===
Some Unix shells use the ampersand as a metacharacter:

Some Unix shells, like the POSIX standard sh shell, use an ampersand to execute a process in the background and to duplicate file descriptors.

- In Bash, the ampersand can separate words, control the command history, duplicate file descriptors, perform logical operations, control jobs, and participate in regular expressions.

=== Web standards ===
The generic URL (Uniform Resource Locator) syntax allows for a query string to be appended to a file name in a web address so that additional information can be passed to a script; the question mark, or query mark, ?, is used to indicate the start of a query string. A query string is usually made up of a number of different name–value pairs, each separated by the ampersand symbol, &. For example, http://www.example.org/list.php?id=1&order=ascending. A "real" ampersand must be replaced by %26 to avoid interpretation as this syntax.

== Typeface samples ==
Noto Sans - Script Ligature Et Ornament

Noto Sans - Ligature Open Et Ornament

The ampersand character, in the OCR-A font

Italic ampersand from a 1735 book (redrawn)
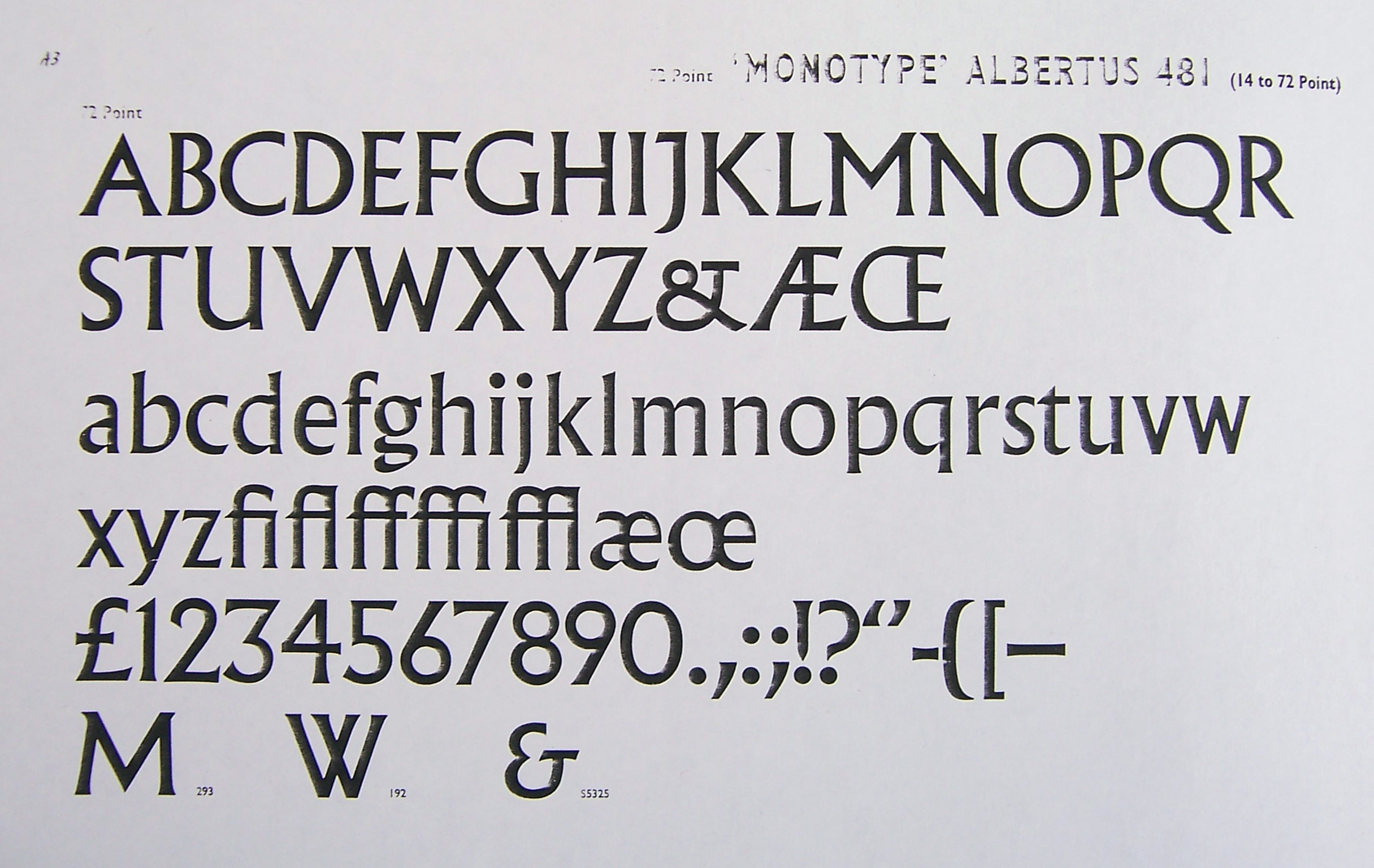
Albertus (typeface) sampler (1936). Two styles of ampersand are shown.

Motorway (typeface) sampler (1958)

Miller (typeface) sampler (1997)

== See also ==
- Ampersand curve – Type of quartic plane curve
- And (disambiguation)
- Heta – Archaic letter in the Greek alphabet
- Kai (abbreviation) – Greek symbol equivalent to &
- List of typographical symbols and punctuation marks
