= Sparkles emoji =

Emoji featuring several stars

The Twemoji sparkles emoji

The Sparkles emoji (U+2728 ✨ SPARKLES) is an emoji that has one large star surrounded by smaller stars. Originating from Japan to represent sparkles used in anime and manga, the sparkles are often used as emphasis in text by surrounding words or phrases with it. It is the third most-used emoji in the world on Twitter as of 2021. Since the mid 2020s it has been used by major software companies to represent artificial intelligence, marketing the technology as being "like magic".

== Development ==
According to Emojipedia, the Sparkles emoji was first used by Japanese mobile operators SoftBank, Docomo and au in the late 1990s. The emoji was added to Unicode 6.0 in 2010 and Emoji 1.0 in 2015.

On some platforms the Sparkles emoji has been multicoloured whilst on other platforms it has been one colour. Twitter and Microsoft's Sparkles have changed from being multicoloured to being a single colour. Samsung's version of the emoji previously had a night sky in the background.

== Usage ==
=== Interpersonal communication ===
The Sparkles emoji was originally meant to represent the usage of sparkles in Japanese anime and manga, where the sparkles are used to represent beauty, happiness or awe. The emoji has several meanings and depends upon context. Starting in the late 2010s, the emoji started being used to surround words or phrases to be used as emphasis, an example from the book Because Internet being "I would simply ✨pass away✨". It can also be used as sarcasm, irony or as a way to mock people. Without emoji this could be represented with tildes or asterisks, for example, "~tildes~" or "~*asterisk plus tilde*~" or "~*~*true sparkle exuberance*~*~". The sparkles emoji can be used to represent stars in text, be used to represent cleanliness or can be used to mean "orgasm" whilst sexting.

In September 2021 the Sparkles emoji overtook the Pleading Face (🥺) emoji to become the third most-used emoji in the world according to Emojipedia, with approximately 1 per cent of all tweets containing the Sparkles emoji.

=== Artificial intelligence ===
The Gemini chatbot logo contains a sparkle.

In the mid 2020s, the Sparkles emoji started being used as an icon to represent artificial intelligence (AI). Companies who use the emoji this way include Google, OpenAI, Samsung, Microsoft, Adobe, Spotify and Zoom. As of August 2024, seven of the top 10 software companies by market capitalisation use the Sparkles emojis with AI. OpenAI has different versions of the Sparkles for different versions of the models that ChatGPT uses. One explanation is that Sparkles is being used by these companies as a way to market AI as "magic". Marketing technology as "magic" has been used before AI, particularly by Apple. Another explanation given by designers and marketers choosing to use Sparkles to signify AI is simply that other platforms are doing it, making it familiar to users.

Around 2024, some of these companies started removing two of the smaller stars from the emoji in their AI services and have kept the one large star, an example being Google's Gemini chatbot.

In early 2024, the Nielsen Norman Group provided test subjects with the star in isolation and found that people did not associate the symbol with AI, but instead mostly with "optimisation" or "favourite or save an item".

== See also ==
- Star (grapheme)#Four points
