= Check mark =

Symbol often denoting 'yes' or 'correct'

✓o

Check mark
- In Unicode: U+2713 ✓ CHECK MARK (&check;, &checkmark;)

Different from
- Different from: U+221A √ SQUARE ROOT; U+23B7 ⎷ RADICAL SYMBOL BOTTOM

The check or check mark (American English), checkmark (Philippine English), tickmark (Indian English) or tick (Australian, New Zealand and British English) is a mark (✓, ✔, etc.) used in many countries, including the English-speaking world, to indicate the concept "yes" (e.g. "yes; this has been verified", "yes; that is the correct answer", "yes; this has been completed", or "yes; this [item or option] applies").

The X mark can also be used for this purpose (most notably on election ballot papers, e.g. in the United Kingdom), but otherwise usually indicates "no", incorrectness, or failure. One of the earliest usages of a check mark as an indication of completion is on ancient Babylonian tablets "where small indentations were sometimes made with a stylus, usually placed at the left of a worker's name, presumably to indicate whether the listed ration has been issued."

As a verb, to check (off) means to add such a mark. Printed forms, printed documents, and computer software (see checkbox) commonly include squares in which to place check marks.

== International differences ==
The check mark is a predominant affirmative symbol of convenience in the English-speaking world because of its instant and simple composition. In other language communities, there may be different conventions.

It is common in Swedish and Norwegian schools for a ✓ to indicate that an answer is incorrect, while "R", from the Swedish rätt or Norwegian riktig, i.e., "correct", is used to indicate that an answer is correct.

In Finnish, ✓ stands for väärin, i.e., "wrong", due to its similarity to a slanted v. The opposite, "correct", is marked with $\cdot \! / \! \cdot$, a slanted vertical line emphasized with two dots (see also commercial minus sign).

In Japan, the O mark is used instead of the check mark, and the X or ✓ mark are commonly used for wrong.

In the Netherlands (and former Dutch colonies) the flourish of approval (or krul) is used for approving a section or sum.

In German-speaking countries, ✓ is used for “correct” or “done”, but not usually for ticking boxes, which are crossed instead. The opposite of ✓ is ƒ (short for falsch “wrong”).

== Unicode ==
Unicode provides various check marks, the one called CHECK MARK is in the U+27xx Dingbats block:

- U+237B ⍻ NOT CHECK MARK
- U+2610 ☐ BALLOT BOX
- U+2611 ☑ BALLOT BOX WITH CHECK
- U+2705 ✅ WHITE HEAVY CHECK MARK
- U+2713 ✓ CHECK MARK (&check;, &checkmark;)
- U+2714 ✔ HEAVY CHECK MARK
- U+2714 ✔ HEAVY CHECK MARK + U+FE0F ️ VARIATION SELECTOR-16 = ✔️ Heavy Check Mark (emoji presentation)
- U+10102 𐄂 AEGEAN CHECK MARK
- U+1D93F 𝤿 SIGNWRITING MOVEMENT-WALLPLANE CHECK SMALL
- U+1D940 𝥀 SIGNWRITING MOVEMENT-WALLPLANE CHECK MEDIUM
- U+1D941 𝥁 SIGNWRITING MOVEMENT-WALLPLANE CHECK LARGE
- U+1F5F8 🗸 LIGHT CHECK MARK
- U+1F5F9 🗹 BALLOT BOX WITH BOLD CHECK
- U+1FBB1 🮱 INVERSE CHECK MARK

== See also ==
- Tally marks – Numeral form used for counting
- Thumb signal – Hand gesture indicating approval or disapproval
- Unicode input – Input characters using their Unicode code points
- X mark – Symbol with multiple meanings
