= Star (grapheme) =

Typographical symbol

In typography, a star is any of several graphemes with a number of points arrayed within an imaginary circle. A commonly used star symbol is the asterisk.

The list below is arranged by number of points typically found on the star grapheme, but the character displayed may differ according which computer font is being used by the viewer's system. A type designer may specify a glyph for a particular grapheme that has a different number of points from that chosen by another designer for the same grapheme. For example, whether the asterisk grapheme has a five‑ or a six-point glyph depends on typeface. In this article, the characters displayed are representative glyphs, whose appearance is determined by the system font on the reader's computer operating systems and web browsers: a colleague using a different system may see slightly different forms. For the same reason, some glyphs may be shown on some systems in their emoji variant rather than their text form.

== Four points ==
✦ ✧ ✨ ⌑ 𖥔

- U+2726 ✦ BLACK FOUR POINTED STAR (any solid colour, such as ✦)
- U+2727 ✧ WHITE FOUR POINTED STAR (any outline colour, such as ✧)
- U+2728 ✨ SPARKLES
- U+2311 ⌑ SQUARE LOZENGE
- U+16954 𖥔 BAMUM LETTER PHASE-D SHII

== Five points ==
* *️⃣ ◌⃰ ≛ ⋆ ⍟ ⍣ ★ ☆ ☪ ☪️ ⚝ ⛤ ⛥ ⛦ ⛧ ✩ ✪ ✫ ✬ ✭ ✮ ✯ ✰ ⭐ ⭑ ⭒ 🌟 🌠 𖤐 ٭

- U+002A * ASTERISK
  - When combined with U+FE0F ◌️ VARIATION SELECTOR-16 and U+20E3 ◌⃣ COMBINING ENCLOSING KEYCAP this character is displayed as the emoji Keycap Asterisk: *️⃣
- U+20F0 ◌⃰ COMBINING ASTERISK ABOVE
- U+225B ≛ STAR EQUALS
- U+22C6 ⋆ STAR OPERATOR
- U+235F ⍟ APL FUNCTIONAL SYMBOL CIRCLE STAR
- U+2363 ⍣ APL FUNCTIONAL SYMBOL STAR DIAERESIS
- U+2605 ★ BLACK STAR
- U+2606 ☆ WHITE STAR
- U+262A ☪ STAR AND CRESCENT
  - This character has an emoji presentation (☪️) when used with U+FE0F ️ VARIATION SELECTOR-16.
- U+269D ⚝ OUTLINED WHITE STAR
- U+26E4 ⛤ PENTAGRAM
- U+26E5 ⛥ RIGHT-HANDED INTERLACED PENTAGRAM
- U+26E6 ⛦ LEFT-HANDED INTERLACED PENTAGRAM
- U+26E7 ⛧ INVERTED PENTAGRAM
- U+2729 ✩ STRESS OUTLINED WHITE STAR
- U+272A ✪ CIRCLED WHITE STAR
- U+272B ✫ OPEN CENTRE BLACK STAR
- U+272C ✬ BLACK CENTRE WHITE STAR
- U+272D ✭ OUTLINED BLACK STAR
- U+272E ✮ HEAVY OUTLINED BLACK STAR
- U+272F ✯ PINWHEEL STAR
- U+2730 ✰ SHADOWED WHITE STAR
- U+2B50 ⭐ WHITE MEDIUM STAR
- U+2B51 ⭑ BLACK SMALL STAR
- U+2B52 ⭒ WHITE SMALL STAR
- U+1F31F 🌟 GLOWING STAR
- U+1F320 🌠 SHOOTING STAR
- U+16910 𖤐 BAMUM LETTER PHASE-D NGKEURI
- U+204E ⁎ LOW ASTERISK
- U+066D ٭ ARABIC FIVE POINTED STAR (Note: Although this character is defined in the Unicode reference as having five points, in some fonts it has a different number. In some, such as Arial Unicode MS, it even has six.)

=== See also ===
- Mullet (heraldry)

== Six points ==
∗ ⚹ ✡ ✡️ ✶ ꙳ 🔯 ꘎ ＊ 🞵 🞶 🞷 🞸 🞹 🞺

- U+2217 ∗ ASTERISK OPERATOR
  - "may be used to represent the telephony asterisk seen on keypads".
- U+26B9 ⚹ SEXTILE (an astrological symbol)
- U+2721 ✡ STAR OF DAVID
  - This character has an emoji presentation (✡️) when used with U+FE0F ️ VARIATION SELECTOR-16.
- U+2736 ✶ SIX POINTED BLACK STAR
- U+A673 ꙳ SLAVONIC ASTERISK
- U+1F52F 🔯 SIX POINTED STAR WITH MIDDLE DOT
- U+A60E ꘎ VAI FULL STOP
- U+FF0A ＊ FULLWIDTH ASTERISK
- Six spoke asterisk, various weights
  - U+1F7B5 🞵 LIGHT SIX SPOKED ASTERISK
  - U+1F7B6 🞶 MEDIUM SIX SPOKED ASTERISK
    - "may represent the 'star' symbol devised in ITU-T E.161 for use on telephony devices"
  - U+1F7B7 🞷 BOLD SIX SPOKED ASTERISK
  - U+1F7B8 🞸 HEAVY SIX SPOKED ASTERISK
  - U+1F7B9 🞹 VERY HEAVY SIX SPOKED ASTERISK
  - U+1F7BA 🞺 EXTREMELY HEAVY SIX SPOKED ASTERISK
- Star of Life: (not in Unicode)
- Astronomical symbol for star: (several Unicode characters have a similar appearance, none are identified in the standard specifically for this use)

=== See also ===
- Seal of Solomon
- Hexagram

== Seven points ==
- Commonwealth Star
- Heptagram

== Eight points ==
⁕ ꥟ ✳ ✳️ ✴ ✴️ ✵ ✷ ✸ ❂ 𒀭 ۞ 𖤓

- U+2055 ⁕ FLOWER PUNCTUATION MARK
- U+A95F ꥟ REJANG SECTION MARK
- U+2733 ✳ EIGHT SPOKED ASTERISK
  - This character has an emoji presentation (✳️) when used with U+FE0F ️ VARIATION SELECTOR-16.
- U+2734 ✴ EIGHT POINTED BLACK STAR
- U+2735 ✵ EIGHT POINTED PINWHEEL STAR
- U+2737 ✷ EIGHT POINTED RECTILINEAR BLACK STAR
- U+2738 ✸ HEAVY EIGHT POINTED RECTILINEAR BLACK STAR
- U+2742 ❂ CIRCLED OPEN CENTRE EIGHT POINTED STAR
- U+1202D 𒀭 CUNEIFORM SIGN AN
- U+06DE ۞ ARABIC START OF RUB EL HIZB
- U+16913 𖤓 BAMUM LETTER PHASE-D NGKYEE

== Nine points ==
🟙

- U+1F7D9 🟙 NINE POINTED WHITE STAR (Baháʼí symbols#Nine-pointed star)

=== See also ===
- Enneagram

== Ten points ==
- Decagram

== Eleven points ==
𖣔

- U+168D4 𖣔 BAMUM LETTER PHASE-C NTEN
- Hendecagram

== Twelve points ==
✹

- U+2739 ✹ TWELVE POINTED BLACK STAR

=== See also ===
- Blue Sky with a White Sun
- Dodecagram

== Thirteen points ==
- Tridecagram

== Fourteen points ==
- Tetradecagram

== Fifteen points ==
- Pentadecagram

== Sixteen points ==
✺

- U+273A ✺ SIXTEEN POINTED ASTERISK

=== See also ===
- Hexadecagram

== Multiple stars ==
✨ ⁑ ⁂ ᕯ 𖤉

- U+2728 ✨ SPARKLES (Emoji)
- U+2051 ⁑ TWO ASTERISKS ALIGNED VERTICALLY
- U+2042 ⁂ ASTERISM
- U+156F ᕯ CANADIAN SYLLABICS TTH
- U+16909 𖤉 BAMUM LETTER PHASE-D NDEUX

== See also ==
- Asterisk
- Asterism (typography)
- Polygons
- Solar symbols § Modern pictogram
- Star polygon
- Star polygons in art and culture
- Unicode symbols
