= Supplemental Punctuation =

- Range: U+2E00..U+2E7F (128 code points)
- Plane: BMP
- Scripts: Common
- Assigned: 98 code points
- Unused: 30 reserved code points

Unicode Version History
- 4.1 (2005): 26 (+26)
- 5.1 (2008): 49 (+23)
- 5.2 (2009): 50 (+1)
- 6.1 (2012): 60 (+10)
- 7.0 (2014): 67 (+7)
- 9.0 (2016): 69 (+2)
- 10.0 (2017): 74 (+5)
- 11.0 (2018): 79 (+5)
- 12.0 (2019): 80 (+1)
- 13.0 (2020): 83 (+3)
- 14.0 (2021): 94 (+11)
- 18.0 (2026): 98 (+4)

Unicode documentation
- Code chart ∣ Web page

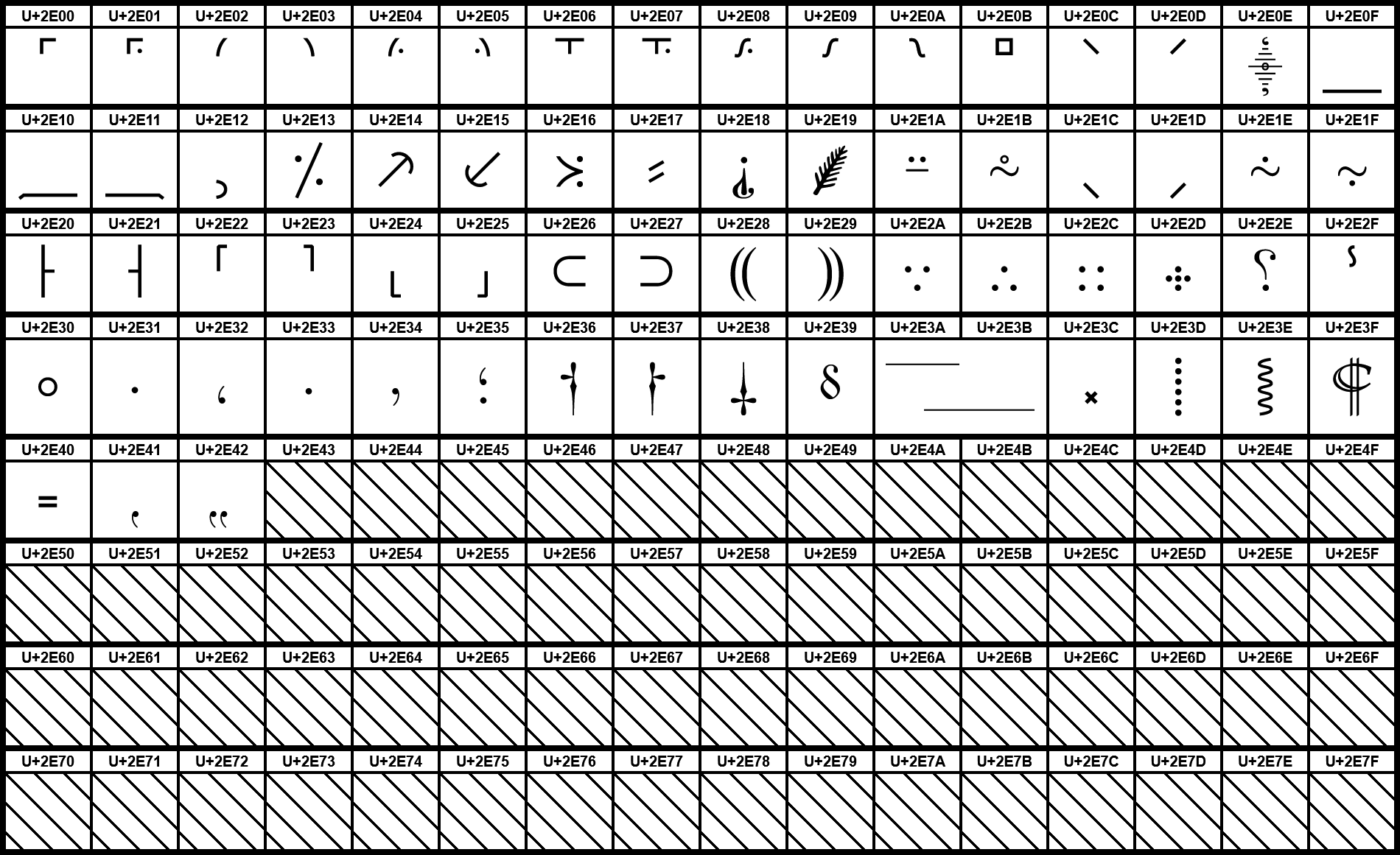
Graphical representation of the Supplemental Punctuation Unicode block

Supplemental Punctuation is a Unicode block containing historic and specialized punctuation characters, including biblical editorial symbols, ancient Greek punctuation, and German dictionary marks.

Additional punctuation characters are in the General Punctuation block and sprinkled in dozens of other Unicode blocks.

== Block ==
Supplemental Punctuation^{[1]}^{[2]} Official Unicode Consortium code chart (PDF)
	0	1	2	3	4	5	6	7	8	9	A	B	C	D	E	F
U+2E0x	⸀	⸁	⸂	⸃	⸄	⸅	⸆	⸇	⸈	⸉	⸊	⸋	⸌	⸍	⸎	⸏
U+2E1x	⸐	⸑	⸒	⸓	⸔	⸕	⸖	⸗	⸘	⸙	⸚	⸛	⸜	⸝	⸞	⸟
U+2E2x	⸠	⸡	⸢	⸣	⸤	⸥	⸦	⸧	⸨	⸩	⸪	⸫	⸬	⸭	⸮	ⸯ
U+2E3x	⸰	⸱	⸲	⸳	⸴	⸵	⸶	⸷	⸸	⸹	2M ⸺	3M ⸻	⸼	⸽	⸾	⸿
U+2E4x	⹀	⹁	⹂	⹃	⹄	⹅	⹆	⹇	⹈	⹉	⹊	⹋	⹌	⹍	⹎	⹏
U+2E5x	⹐	⹑	⹒	⹓	⹔	⹕	⹖	⹗	⹘	⹙	⹚	⹛	⹜	⹝		
U+2E6x	⹠	⹡	⹢	⹣												
U+2E7x																
Notes 1.As of Unicode version 18.0 2.Grey areas indicate non-assigned code points

== History ==
The following Unicode-related documents record the purpose and process of defining specific characters in the Supplemental Punctuation block:

Version	Final code points (Note: Proposed code points and characters names may differ from final code points and names)	Count	L2 ID	WG2 ID	Document
4.1	U+2E00..2E16	23	L2/02-033		Anderson, Deborah (2002-01-21), TLG Unicode Proposal (draft)
4.1	U+2E00..2E16	23	L2/02-053		Anderson, Deborah (2002-02-04), Description of TLG Documents
4.1	U+2E00..2E16	23	L2/02-273		Pantelia, Maria (2002-07-31), TLG Unicode Proposal
4.1	U+2E00..2E16	23	L2/02-287		Pantelia, Maria (2002-08-09), Proposal Summary Form accompanying TLG Unicode Proposal (L2/02-273)
4.1	U+2E00..2E16	23	L2/02-312R		Pantelia, Maria (2002-11-07), Proposal to encode additional Greek editorial and punctuation characters in the UCS
4.1	U+2E00..2E16	23	L2/02-317R		Pantelia, Maria (2002-11-07), Proposal to encode New Testament editorial characters in the UCS
4.1	U+2E00..2E16	23	L2/03-074R2	N2612-1	Pantelia, Maria (2003-06-11), Proposal to encode New Testament editorial characters in the UCS
4.1	U+2E00..2E16	23	L2/03-324	N2642	Pantelia, Maria (2003-10-06), Proposal to encode additional Greek editorial and punctuation characters in the UCS
4.1	U+2E00..2E16	23	L2/03-356R2		Moore, Lisa (2003-10-22), "Consensus 97-C12", UTC #97 Minutes
4.1	U+2E00..2E16	23	L2/03-379	N2675	Everson, Michael (2003-10-22), Proposal to add one punctuation character to the UCS
4.1	U+2E17	1	L2/00-128		Bunz, Carl-Martin (2000-03-01), Scripts from the Past in Future Versions of Unicode
4.1	U+2E17	1	L2/03-283	N2611	Everson, Michael (2003-08-24), Proposal to add the Coptic alphabet to the BMP of the UCS
4.1	U+2E17	1	L2/03-327	N2636	Everson, Michael (2003-10-01), Revised proposal to add the Coptic alphabet to the BMP of the UCS
4.1	U+2E17	1	L2/03-329	N2639	Everson, Michael (2003-10-03), On the use of HYPHEN and DOUBLE HYPHEN in Fraktur typography
4.1	U+2E17	1	L2/03-354	N2655	Freytag, Asmus (2003-10-10), Proposal -- Symbols used in Dictionaries
4.1	U+2E17	1	L2/03-338	N2647	Everson, Michael (2003-10-13), Further discussion of the DOUBLE OBLIQUE HYPHEN
4.1	U+2E17	1	L2/03-360	N2657	Freytag, Asmus (2003-10-15), Additional information on typesetting Fraktur
4.1	U+2E17	1	L2/03-347		Anderson, Deborah (2003-10-19), Background on DOUBLE OBLIQUE HYPHEN
4.1	U+2E17	1	L2/03-356R2		Moore, Lisa (2003-10-22), "Consensus 97-C14", UTC #97 Minutes
4.1	U+2E17	1	L2/04-053		Emmel, Stephen (2004-01-26), Changes to ISO/IEC JTC1/SC2/WG2 N2636 and N2676 recommended by the International Association for Coptic Studies
4.1	U+2E17	1	L2/04-130	N2744	Everson, Michael; Emmel, Stephen (2004-04-20), Revision of the Coptic block under ballot for the BMP of the UCS
4.1	U+2E17	1		N2824	Updated charts for Coptic N2744, 2004-06-22
4.1	U+2E1C..2E1D	2	L2/04-283	N2833	Everson, Michael (2004-06-23), Revisions to the N'Ko script for the PDAM code chart
5.1	U+2E18	1	L2/05-086	N2935	Everson, Michael (2005-04-01), Proposal to add INVERTED INTERROBANG to the UCS
5.1	U+2E18	1	L2/05-141		McGowan, Rick (2005-05-10), "C.4", Scripts Subcommittee Meeting Report
5.1	U+2E18	1	L2/05-270		Whistler, Ken (2005-09-21), "G. Inverted Interrobang", WG2 Consent Docket (Sophia Antipolis)
5.1	U+2E18	1	L2/05-337		Abril, Amadeu Abril i (2005-10-23), Letter from Amadeu Abril i Abril in support of inverted interrobang
5.1	U+2E18	1	L2/05-279		Moore, Lisa (2005-11-10), "Consensus 105-C30", UTC #105 Minutes
5.1	U+2E18	1		N2953 (pdf, doc)	Umamaheswaran, V. S. (2006-02-16), "7.2.5", Unconfirmed minutes of WG 2 meeting 47, Sophia Antipolis, France; 2005-09-12/15
5.1	U+2E19	1	L2/06-269	N3218	Perry, David J. (2006-08-01), Proposal to Add Additional Ancient Roman Characters to UCS
5.1	U+2E19	1	L2/06-324R2		Moore, Lisa (2006-11-29), "Consensus 109-C33", UTC #109 Minutes
5.1	U+2E19	1	L2/07-268	N3253 (pdf, doc)	Umamaheswaran, V. S. (2007-07-26), "M50.24", Unconfirmed minutes of WG 2 meeting 50, Frankfurt-am-Main, Germany; 2007-04-24/27
5.1	U+2E19	1	L2/15-050R (Note: See also L2/13-207, L2/14-054, L2/14-063, L2/15-051A, L2/15-051B) (Note: Refer to the history section of the Miscellaneous Symbols and Pictographs block for additional emoji-related documents)		Davis, Mark; et al. (2015-01-29), Additional variation selectors for emoji
5.1	U+2E1A..2E1B, 2E1E..2E2E, 2E30	20	L2/05-183	N2957	Everson, Michael; Haugen, Odd Einar; Emiliano, António; Pedro, Susana; Grammel, Florian; Baker, Peter; Stötzner, Andreas; Dohnicht, Marcus; Luft, Diana (2005-08-02), Preliminary proposal to add medievalist characters to the UCS
5.1	U+2E1A..2E1B, 2E1E..2E2E, 2E30	20		N2953 (pdf, doc)	Umamaheswaran, V. S. (2006-02-16), "7.4.6", Unconfirmed minutes of WG 2 meeting 47, Sophia Antipolis, France; 2005-09-12/15
5.1	U+2E1A..2E1B, 2E1E..2E2E, 2E30	20	L2/07-004	N3193	Everson, Michael; Baker, Peter; Dohnicht, Marcus; Emiliano, António; Haugen, Odd Einar; Pedro, Susana; Perry, David J.; Pournader, Roozbeh (2007-01-09), Proposal to add Medievalist and Iranianist punctuation characters to the UCS
5.1	U+2E1A..2E1B, 2E1E..2E2E, 2E30	20	L2/07-015		Moore, Lisa (2007-02-08), "C.14", UTC #110 Minutes
5.1	U+2E1A..2E1B, 2E1E..2E2E, 2E30	20		N3353 (pdf, doc)	Umamaheswaran, V. S. (2007-10-10), "M51.3f, M51.3g", Unconfirmed minutes of WG 2 meeting 51 Hanzhou, China; 2007-04-24/27
5.1	U+2E1A..2E1B, 2E1E..2E2E, 2E30	20	L2/07-268	N3253 (pdf, doc)	Umamaheswaran, V. S. (2007-07-26), "M50.26", Unconfirmed minutes of WG 2 meeting 50, Frankfurt-am-Main, Germany; 2007-04-24/27
5.1	U+2E1A..2E1B, 2E1E..2E2E, 2E30	20	L2/07-345		Moore, Lisa (2007-10-25), "Consensus 113-C12", UTC #113 Minutes
5.1	U+2E2F	1	L2/06-042		Cleminson, Ralph (2006-01-26), Proposal for additional Cyrillic characters
5.1	U+2E2F	1	L2/06-181		Anderson, Deborah (2006-05-08), Responses to the UTC regarding L2/06-042, Proposal for Additional Cyrillic Characters
5.1	U+2E2F	1	L2/06-359		Cleminson, Ralph (2006-10-31), Proposal for additional Cyrillic characters
5.1	U+2E2F	1	L2/07-003	N3194	Everson, Michael; Birnbaum, David; Cleminson, Ralph; Derzhanski, Ivan; Dorosh, Vladislav; Kryukov, Alexey; Paliga, Sorin; Ruppel, Klaas (2007-01-12), Proposal to encode additional Cyrillic characters in the BMP of the UCS
5.1	U+2E2F	1	L2/07-055		Cleminson, Ralph (2007-01-19), Comments on Additional Cyrillic Characters (L2/07-003 = WG2 N3194)
5.1	U+2E2F	1	L2/07-015		Moore, Lisa (2007-02-08), "Cyrillic (C.13)", UTC #110 Minutes
5.1	U+2E2F	1	L2/07-268	N3253 (pdf, doc)	Umamaheswaran, V. S. (2007-07-26), "M50.11", Unconfirmed minutes of WG 2 meeting 50, Frankfurt-am-Main, Germany; 2007-04-24/27
5.2	U+2E31	1		N3353 (pdf, doc)	Umamaheswaran, V. S. (2007-10-10), "M51.8", Unconfirmed minutes of WG 2 meeting 51 Hanzhou, China; 2007-04-24/27
5.2	U+2E31	1	L2/07-258		Whistler, Ken (2007-08-02), Middle Dots and Don'ts
5.2	U+2E31	1	L2/07-260		Freytag, Asmus (2007-08-05), Non-blank spaces
5.2	U+2E31	1	L2/07-225		Moore, Lisa (2007-08-21), "B.14.6", UTC #112 Minutes
5.2	U+2E31	1	L2/07-320	N3347	Proposal to Encode WORD SEPARATOR MIDDLE DOT, 2007-09-18
5.2	U+2E31	1	L2/07-345		Moore, Lisa (2007-10-25), "Consensus 113-C13", UTC #113 Minutes, "Accept the codepoint change: U+2E37 WORD SEPARATOR MIDDLE DOT => U+2E31 WORD SEPARATOR MIDDLE DOT."
6.1	U+2E32, 2E35..2E39	6	L2/09-425	N3740	Everson, Michael (2009-12-05), Proposal to encode six punctuation characters in the UCS
6.1	U+2E32, 2E35..2E39	6	L2/10-015R		Moore, Lisa (2010-02-09), "C.22", UTC #122 / L2 #219 Minutes
6.1	U+2E32, 2E35..2E39	6		N3803 (pdf, doc)	"M56.08b", Unconfirmed minutes of WG 2 meeting no. 56, 2010-09-24
6.1	U+2E33..2E34	2	L2/10-290	N3873R	Everson, Michael; Emmel, Stephen; Richter, Siegfried G.; Pedro, Susana; Emiliano, António (2010-08-05), Proposal to add additional characters for Greek, Latin, and Coptic
6.1	U+2E33..2E34	2	L2/10-348	N3912	Everson, Michael; Emmel, Stephen; Richter, Siegfried G.; Pedro, Susana; Emiliano, António (2010-09-21), Revised proposal to add additional characters for Greek, Latin, and Coptic to the UCS
6.1	U+2E33..2E34	2	L2/10-416R		Moore, Lisa (2010-11-09), "Consensus 125-C19", UTC #125 / L2 #222 Minutes
6.1	U+2E33..2E34	2	L2/11-057	N3984	Pentzlin, Karl (2011-02-02), Notes on the naming of some characters proposed in the FCD of ISO/IEC 10646:2012
6.1	U+2E33..2E34	2		N3903 (pdf, doc)	"M57.02f", Unconfirmed minutes of WG2 meeting 57, 2011-03-31
6.1	U+2E3A..2E3B	2	L2/10-015R		Moore, Lisa (2010-02-09), "C.24", UTC #122 / L2 #219 Minutes
6.1	U+2E3A..2E3B	2	L2/10-037	N3770	Pentzlin, Karl (2010-02-10), Proposal to encode two dashes required by the Chicago Manual of Style
6.1	U+2E3A..2E3B	2		N3803 (pdf, doc)	"M56.08h", Unconfirmed minutes of WG 2 meeting no. 56, 2010-09-24
7.0	U+2E3C	1	L2/10-272R2	N3895	Anderson, Van (2010-08-12), Proposal to include Duployan Shorthands and Chinook script and Shorthand Format Controls in UCS
7.0	U+2E3C	1	L2/10-221		Moore, Lisa (2010-08-23), "C.21", UTC #124 / L2 #221 Minutes
7.0	U+2E3C	1		N4103	"11.1.5 Duployan Shorthands and Chinook script and Shorthand Format Controls in UCS", Unconfirmed minutes of WG 2 meeting 58, 2012-01-03
7.0	U+2E3D..2E3E	2	L2/10-357	N3914	Proposal to add characters used in Lithuanian dialectology to the UCS, 2010-10-29
7.0	U+2E3D..2E3E	2	L2/11-135		Tumasonis, Vladas; Pentzlin, Karl (2011-05-02), Revised proposal to add characters used in Lithuanian dialectology
7.0	U+2E3D..2E3E	2	L2/11-189		Whistler, Ken; Constable, Peter (2011-05-11), Review of Characters for Lithuanian Dialectology
7.0	U+2E3D..2E3E	2	L2/11-191	N4062	Constable, Peter; Whistler, Ken (2011-05-13), USNB Comments on N3914 -Characters for Lithuanian Dialectology
7.0	U+2E3D..2E3E	2	L2/11-116		Moore, Lisa (2011-05-17), "Consensus 127-C12", UTC #127 / L2 #224 Minutes, "Accept 14 characters for Lithuanian dialectology..."
7.0	U+2E3D..2E3E	2	L2/11-223	N4070	Tumasonis, Vladas; Pentzlin, Karl (2011-05-24), Second revised proposal to add characters used in Lithuanian dialectology to the UCS
7.0	U+2E3D..2E3E	2	L2/11-248	N4116	Pentzlin, Karl (2011-06-09), Report on the ad hoc re "Lithuanian dialectology" (SC2/WG2 N4070) held during the SC2/WG2 meeting at Helsinki
7.0	U+2E3D..2E3E	2		N4103	"11.1.3 Lithuanian dialectology", Unconfirmed minutes of WG 2 meeting 58, 2012-01-03
7.0	U+2E3F	1	L2/11-052R		Suignard, Michel (2011-02-15), Wingdings and Webdings symbols - Preliminary study
7.0	U+2E3F	1	L2/11-149		Suignard, Michel (2011-05-09), Proposal to add Wingdings and Webdings symbols
7.0	U+2E3F	1	L2/11-196	N4022	Suignard, Michel (2011-05-21), Revised Wingdings proposal
7.0	U+2E3F	1	L2/11-247	N4115	Suignard, Michel (2011-06-08), Proposal to add Wingdings and Webdings Symbols
7.0	U+2E3F	1	L2/11-344	N4143	Suignard, Michel (2011-09-28), Updated proposal to add Wingdings and Webdings Symbols
7.0	U+2E3F	1		N4103	"10.2.1 Wingdings/Webdings additions", Unconfirmed minutes of WG 2 meeting 58, 2012-01-03
7.0	U+2E3F	1		N4363	Suignard, Michel (2012-10-13), Status of encoding of Wingdings and Webdings Symbols
7.0	U+2E3F	1	L2/12-368	N4384	Suignard, Michel (2012-11-06), Status of encoding of Wingdings and Webdings Symbols
7.0	U+2E3F	1	L2/12-086	N4223	Requests regarding the Wingdings/Webdings characters in ISO/IEC 10646 PDAM 1.2, 2012-12-27
7.0	U+2E40	1	L2/00-128		Bunz, Carl-Martin (2000-03-01), Scripts from the Past in Future Versions of Unicode
7.0	U+2E40	1	L2/03-283	N2611	Everson, Michael (2003-08-24), Proposal to add the Coptic alphabet to the BMP of the UCS
7.0	U+2E40	1	L2/03-327	N2636	Everson, Michael (2003-10-01), Revised proposal to add the Coptic alphabet to the BMP of the UCS
7.0	U+2E40	1	L2/03-329	N2639	Everson, Michael (2003-10-03), On the use of HYPHEN and DOUBLE HYPHEN in Fraktur typography
7.0	U+2E40	1	L2/03-338	N2647	Everson, Michael (2003-10-13), Further discussion of the DOUBLE OBLIQUE HYPHEN
7.0	U+2E40	1	L2/03-360	N2657	Freytag, Asmus (2003-10-15), Additional information on typesetting Fraktur
7.0	U+2E40	1	L2/03-347		Anderson, Deborah (2003-10-19), Background on DOUBLE OBLIQUE HYPHEN
7.0	U+2E40	1	L2/04-053		Emmel, Stephen (2004-01-26), Changes to ISO/IEC JTC1/SC2/WG2 N2636 and N2676 recommended by the International Association for Coptic Studies
7.0	U+2E40	1	L2/10-162		Pentzlin, Karl (2010-05-04), Proposal to encode a punctuation mark "Double Hyphen"
7.0	U+2E40	1	L2/10-108		Moore, Lisa (2010-05-19), "Consensus 123-C20", UTC #123 / L2 #220 Minutes, "Create a PRI for adding an annotation to U+2E17 DOUBLE OBLIQUE HYPHEN indicating that it may appear in either an oblique or horizontal form."
7.0	U+2E40	1	L2/10-214		Freytag, Asmus (2010-06-17), Oblique hyphen vs. Double Hyphen
7.0	U+2E40	1	L2/10-361	N3917	Pentzlin, Karl (2010-09-28), Revised Proposal to encode a punctuation mark "Double Hyphen"
7.0	U+2E40	1	L2/11-038	N3983	Revised Proposal to encode a punctuation mark "Double Hyphen", 2011-01-17
7.0	U+2E40	1	L2/11-261R2		Moore, Lisa (2011-08-16), "Consensus 128-C32", UTC #128 / L2 #225 Minutes
7.0	U+2E40	1		N4103	"11.7 Punctuation mark "Double Hyphen"", Unconfirmed minutes of WG 2 meeting 58, 2012-01-03
7.0	U+2E41..2E42 (Note: Refer to the history section of the Old Hungarian block for additional Old Hungarian-related documents)	2	L2/09-240	N3664	Everson, Michael; Szelp, André Szabolcs (2009-07-23), Proposal for encoding generic punctuation used with the Hungarian Runic script
7.0	U+2E41..2E42	2	L2/09-292	N3670	Hosszú, Gábor (2009-08-08), Proposal for encoding generic punctuation used with the Szekler Hungarian Rovas script
7.0	U+2E41..2E42	2	L2/11-261R2		Moore, Lisa (2011-08-16), "Consensus 128-C36", UTC #128 / L2 #225 Minutes
7.0	U+2E41..2E42	2		N4103	"11.3 Hungarian Runic/Szekely-Hungarian Rovas", Unconfirmed minutes of WG 2 meeting 58, 2012-01-03
9.0	U+2E43	1	L2/13-164		Cleminson, Ralph; Birnbaum, David (2013-07-25), Feedback from Experts on Cyrillic proposals
9.0	U+2E43	1	L2/13-165		Anderson, Deborah; Whistler, Ken; Pournader, Roozbeh (2013-07-25), "5", Recommendations to UTC on Script Proposals
9.0	U+2E43	1	L2/13-140		Andreev, Aleksandr; Shardt, Yuri; Simmons, Nikita (2013-09-23), Proposal to Encode a Slavonic Punctuation Mark
9.0	U+2E43	1	L2/13-212		Anderson, Deborah (2013-11-01), Expert Feedback on L2/13-140 SLAVONIC PARAGRAPHOS
9.0	U+2E43	1	L2/14-053		Anderson, Deborah; Whistler, Ken; McGowan, Rick; Pournader, Roozbeh; Iancu, Laurențiu (2014-01-26), "27", Recommendations to UTC #138 February 2014 on Script Proposals
9.0	U+2E43	1	L2/13-238	N4534	Andreev, Aleksandr; Shardt, Yuri; Simmons, Nikita (2014-02-04), Proposal to Encode a Slavonic Punctuation Mark in Unicode
9.0	U+2E43	1	L2/14-026		Moore, Lisa (2014-02-17), "C.8.2", UTC #138 Minutes
9.0	U+2E43	1		N4553 (pdf, doc)	Umamaheswaran, V. S. (2014-09-16), "M62.09b, M62.09h", Minutes of WG 2 meeting 62 Adobe, San Jose, CA, USA
9.0	U+2E44	1	L2/14-157	N4595	Kalvesmaki, Joel (2014-07-18), Proposal to encode GREEK BYZANTINE DOUBLE SUSPENSION MARK
9.0	U+2E44	1	L2/14-170		Anderson, Deborah; Whistler, Ken; McGowan, Rick; Pournader, Roozbeh; Iancu, Laurențiu (2014-07-28), "9", Recommendations to UTC #140 August 2014 on Script Proposals
9.0	U+2E44	1	L2/14-177		Moore, Lisa (2014-10-17), "Double Suspension Mark (C.9.2)", UTC #140 Minutes
9.0	U+2E44	1	L2/16-052	N4603 (pdf, doc)	Umamaheswaran, V. S. (2015-09-01), "M63.11s", Unconfirmed minutes of WG 2 meeting 63
10.0	U+2E45..2E49	5	L2/15-173		Andreev, Aleksandr; Shardt, Yuri; Simmons, Nikita (2015-07-29), Proposal to Encode some Additional Symbols used in Church Slavonic Text
10.0	U+2E45..2E49	5	L2/15-187		Moore, Lisa (2015-08-11), "E.2", UTC #144 Minutes
10.0	U+2E45..2E49	5		N4739	"M64.06", Unconfirmed minutes of WG 2 meeting 64, 2016-08-31
11.0	U+2E4A..2E4E	5	L2/07-004	N3193	Everson, Michael; Baker, Peter; Dohnicht, Marcus; Emiliano, António; Haugen, Odd Einar; Pedro, Susana; Perry, David J.; Pournader, Roozbeh (2007-01-09), Proposal to add Medievalist and Iranianist punctuation characters to the UCS
11.0	U+2E4A..2E4E	5	L2/16-037		Anderson, Deborah; Whistler, Ken; McGowan, Rick; Pournader, Roozbeh; Glass, Andrew; Iancu, Laurențiu (2016-01-22), "1. Latin", Recommendations to UTC #146 January 2016 on Script Proposals
11.0	U+2E4A..2E4E	5	L2/15-327R	N4704R	Everson, Michael; Baker, Peter; Grammel, Florian; Haugen, Odd Einar (2016-01-25), Proposal to add Medievalist punctuation characters
11.0	U+2E4A..2E4E	5	L2/16-004		Moore, Lisa (2016-02-01), "C.5", UTC #146 Minutes
11.0	U+2E4A..2E4E	5	L2/16-125	N4726	Everson, Michael; Baker, Peter; Grammel, Florian; Haugen, Odd Einar (2016-05-04), Revised Proposal to add Medievalist punctuation characters
11.0	U+2E4A..2E4E	5	L2/16-123		"Feedback on medieval punctuation", Comments on Public Review Issues (Jan 22, 2016 - May 03, 2016), 2016-05-05
11.0	U+2E4A..2E4E	5	L2/16-156		Anderson, Deborah; Whistler, Ken; Pournader, Roozbeh; Glass, Andrew; Iancu, Laurențiu (2016-05-06), "1. Latin", Recommendations to UTC #147 May 2016 on Script Proposals
11.0	U+2E4A..2E4E	5	L2/16-219		Anderson, Deborah (2016-07-30), Feedback and Evidence on Medievalist punctuation characters
11.0	U+2E4A..2E4E	5	L2/16-220		Everson, Michael; Anderson, Deborah; et al. (2016-08-01), Proposal for Medieval Comma
11.0	U+2E4A..2E4E	5	L2/16-235		Everson, Michael; Anderson, Deborah; et al. (2016-08-05), Proposal to encode PARAGRAPHUS and PUNCTUS ELEVATUS
11.0	U+2E4A..2E4E	5	L2/16-203		Moore, Lisa (2016-08-18), "C.14.2, C.14.3, C.14.4", UTC #148 Minutes
11.0	U+2E4A..2E4E	5		N4873R (pdf, doc)	"M65.04c, 10.3.1, M65.08b", Unconfirmed minutes of WG 2 meeting 65, 2018-03-16
12.0	U+2E4F	1	L2/17-342	N4902	Everson, Michael (2017-09-27), Proposal to add two characters for Medieval Cornish
12.0	U+2E4F	1		N4910	Anderson, Deborah (2017-09-27), Medieval Ad Hoc Report
12.0	U+2E4F	1		N4953 (pdf, doc)	"M66.16e", Unconfirmed minutes of WG 2 meeting 66, 2018-03-23
12.0	U+2E4F	1	L2/17-357	N4906	Everson, Michael (2017-10-19), Proposal to add one punctuation character for Medieval Cornish
12.0	U+2E4F	1	L2/17-384		Anderson, Deborah; Whistler, Ken; Pournader, Roozbeh; Moore, Lisa; Liang, Hai (2017-10-22), "2. Latin", Recommendations to UTC #153 October 2017 on Script Proposals
12.0	U+2E4F	1		N4938	"Names changes", Draft Disposition of comments on PDAM2 to ISO/IEC 10646 5th edition, 2018-03-13
12.0	U+2E4F	1	L2/18-183		Moore, Lisa (2018-11-20), "Consensus 156-C8", UTC #156 Minutes
12.0	U+2E4F	1		N5020 (pdf, doc)	Umamaheswaran, V. S. (2019-01-11), "7.4.1 T1", Unconfirmed minutes of WG 2 meeting 67
13.0	U+2E50..2E51	2	L2/19-076R	N5037R	Everson, Michael (2019-05-05), Proposal to encode three cross symbols
13.0	U+2E50..2E51	2	L2/19-173		Anderson, Deborah; et al. (2019-04-29), "25", Recommendations to UTC #159 April-May 2019 on Script Proposals
13.0	U+2E50..2E51	2	L2/19-122		Moore, Lisa (2019-05-08), "M68.10", UTC #159 Minutes
13.0	U+2E50..2E51	2		N5122	"M68.10", Unconfirmed minutes of WG 2 meeting 68, 2019-12-31
13.0	U+2E52	1	L2/17-300	N4841	Everson, Michael (2017-09-05), Proposal to add five Latin Tironian letters
13.0	U+2E52	1	L2/17-367	N4885	Anderson, Deborah; Whistler, Ken; Pournader, Roozbeh; Moore, Lisa (2017-09-18), "1. b.", Comments on WG2 #66 (Sept. 2017) documents
13.0	U+2E52	1		N4953 (pdf, doc)	"M66.19n", Unconfirmed minutes of WG 2 meeting 66, 2018-03-23
13.0	U+2E52	1	L2/17-359	N4908	Everson, Michael (2017-10-21), Proposal to add six Latin Tironian letters
13.0	U+2E52	1	L2/17-384		Anderson, Deborah; Whistler, Ken; Pournader, Roozbeh; Moore, Lisa; Liang, Hai (2017-10-22), "b. Tironian et", Recommendations to UTC #153 October 2017 on Script Proposals
13.0	U+2E52	1	L2/19-172	N5042	Everson, Michael; West, Andrew (2019-04-26), Proposal to add one or two Latin Tironian letters
13.0	U+2E52	1	L2/19-199		Silva, Eduardo Marín (2019-05-07), Response to the proposal to add the Tironinan letters
13.0	U+2E52	1		N5095	Anderson, Deborah; Whistler, Ken; Pournader, Roozbeh; Liang, Hai; Constable, Peter; Moore, Lisa (2019-06-10), "Tironian letters", Comments on WG2 #68 documents
13.0	U+2E52	1		N5122	"M68.05", Unconfirmed minutes of WG 2 meeting 68, 2019-12-31
13.0	U+2E52	1	L2/19-286		Anderson, Deborah; Whistler, Ken; Pournader, Roozbeh; Moore, Lisa; Liang, Hai (2019-07-22), "e. Tironian letters", Recommendations to UTC #160 July 2019 on Script Proposals
13.0	U+2E52	1	L2/19-270		Moore, Lisa (2019-10-07), "Consensus 160-C13", UTC #160 Minutes
14.0	U+2E53..2E54	2	L2/20-270R (Note: See also L2/16-125, L2/15-327R, and L2/07-004)	N5147R	Everson, Michael (2020-11-10), Proposal to add two mediaeval punctuation characters
14.0	U+2E53..2E54	2	L2/21-016R		Anderson, Deborah; Whistler, Ken; Pournader, Roozbeh; Moore, Lisa; Liang, Hai (2021-01-14), "3k. Medieval Punctuation", Recommendations to UTC #166 January 2021 on Script Proposals
14.0	U+2E53..2E54	2	L2/21-009		Moore, Lisa (2021-01-27), "B.1 — 3k. Medieval Punctuation", UTC #166 Minutes
14.0	U+2E55..2E5C	8	L2/21-042		Miller, Kirk (2021-01-11), Unicode request for phonetic punctuation & diacritics
14.0	U+2E55..2E5C	8	L2/21-016R		Anderson, Deborah; Whistler, Ken; Pournader, Roozbeh; Moore, Lisa; Liang, Hai (2021-01-14), "3g. Phonetic Punctuation and Diacritics", Recommendations to UTC #166 January 2021 on Script Proposals
14.0	U+2E55..2E5C	8	L2/21-009		Moore, Lisa (2021-01-27), "B.1 — 3g. Phonetic Punctuation and Diacritics", UTC #166 Minutes
14.0	U+2E5D	1	L2/21-036	N5152	Everson, Michael (2021-01-12), Proposal to add the OBLIQUE HYPHEN
14.0	U+2E5D	1	L2/21-016R		Anderson, Deborah; Whistler, Ken; Pournader, Roozbeh; Moore, Lisa; Liang, Hai (2021-01-14), "3p. OBLIQUE HYPHEN", Recommendations to UTC #166 January 2021 on Script Proposals
14.0	U+2E5D	1	L2/21-009		Moore, Lisa (2021-01-27), "B.1 — 3p. Oblique Hyphen", UTC #166 Minutes
18.0	U+2E60..2E63	4	L2/10-229R		Pentzlin, Karl (2010-08-04), Proposal to encode characters for the English Phonotypic Alphabet (EPA) in the UCS
18.0	U+2E60..2E63	4	L2/10-403		Pentzlin, Karl (2010-10-24), Proposal to encode characters for the English Phonotypic Alphabet (EPA) in the UCS
18.0	U+2E60..2E63	4	L2/11-040	N3981	Revised Proposal to encode characters for the English Phonotypic Alphabet (EPA) in the UCS, 2011-02-02
18.0	U+2E60..2E63	4	L2/11-153		Pentzlin, Karl (2011-05-04), Second Revised Proposal to encode characters for the English Phonotypic Alphabet (EPA) in the UCS
18.0	U+2E60..2E63	4	L2/11-225	N4079R	Pentzlin, Karl (2011-05-23), Second Revised Proposal to encode characters for the English Phonotypic Alphabet (EPA) in the UCS
18.0	U+2E60..2E63	4	L2/24-136	N5269	Pentzlin, Karl (2024-06-05), Fourth Revised Proposal to encode characters for the English Phonotypic Alphabet (EPA) in the UCS
18.0	U+2E60..2E63	4	L2/24-166		Anderson, Deborah; Goregaokar, Manish; Kučera, Jan; Whistler, Ken; Pournader, Roozbeh; Constable, Peter (2024-07-18), "30", Recommendations to UTC #180 July 2024 on Script Proposals
18.0	U+2E60..2E63	4	L2/25-010		Kučera, Jan; et al. (2025-01-16), "1.6 English Phonotypic Alphabet", Recommendations to UTC #182 (January 2025) on Script Proposals
18.0	U+2E60..2E63	4	L2/25-003		Leroy, Robin (2025-01-28), "Consensus 182-C7", UTC #182 Minutes, "Provisionally assign ..."
18.0	U+2E60..2E63	4	L2/25-226		"Consensus 185-C40", UTC #185 Minutes, 2025-10-29, "UTC accepts for encoding in Unicode 18.0 ..."

== See also ==
- Unicode symbols
