= Greek orthography =

Writing system of Modern Greek

The orthography of the modern Greek language was standardised in 1976 and the diacritics were simplified in 1982. There are relatively few differences between the orthography of Ancient Greek and Modern Greek.

Some time prior to that, one early form of Greek, Mycenaean, was written in Linear B, although there was a lapse of several centuries (the Greek Dark Ages) between the time Mycenaean stopped being written and the time when the Greek alphabet came into use.

Early Greek writing in the Greek alphabet was phonemic, different in each dialect. Since the adoption of the Ionic variant for Attic in 403 BC, however, Greek orthography has been largely conservative and historical.

Given the phonetic development of Greek, especially in the Hellenistic period, certain modern vowel phonemes have multiple orthographic realizations:

- /i/ can be spelled η, ι, υ, ει, οι, or υι (see Iotacism);
- /e/ can be spelled either ε or αι;
- /o/ can be spelled either ο or ω.

This affects not only lexical items but also inflectional affixes, so correct orthography requires mastery of formal grammar, e.g. η καλή /i kaˈli/ 'the good one (fem., sg.)' vs. οι καλοί /i kaˈli/ 'the good ones (masc., pl.)'; καλώ /kaˈlo/ 'I call' vs. καλό /kaˈlo/ 'good (neut. sg.)'.

Similarly, the orthography preserves ancient doubled consonants, though these are now pronounced the same as single consonants, except in Cypriot Greek.

== Letters ==
Letter	Name	Ancient pronunciation	Modern pronunciation		Transliteration Ancient Greek	Transliteration Modern Greek
Letter	Name	IPA	IPA		ALA-LC (2010)	ELOT 743, 2nd ed. (Type 1 - transliteration) (2001)
Α α	álpha, άλφα	Short: [a] Long: [aː]	[a]		a	
Β β	bēta, βήτα	[b]	[v]		b	v
Γ γ	gámma, γάμμα	[ɡ]	[ɣ] before [a], [o], [u]	[ʝ] before [e], [i]	g	g
Γ γ	gámma, γάμμα	[ŋ] when used before γ, κ, ξ, χ, and possibly μ	[ŋ] (Note: For example, εγγραφή.)	[ɲ] (Note: For example, εγγεγραμμένος.)	n	g
Δ δ	délta, δέλτα	[d]	[ð]		d	d
Ε ε	épsilon, έψιλον	[e]			e	
Ζ ζ	zēta, ζήτα	[zd] or [dz]	[z]		z	z
Η η	ēta, ήτα	[ɛː]	[i]		ē	ī
Θ θ	thēta, θήτα	[t̪ʰ]	[θ]		th	th
Ι ι	iōta, ιώτα	Short: [i] Long: [iː]	often [i], when with "ι" can be [ç], (Note: For example, πάπια.) [ʝ], (Note: For example, βια.) [ɲ] (Note: For example, μια.)		i	
Κ κ	káppa, κάππα	[k]	[k] before [a], [o], [u] and consonant	[c] before [e], [i]	k	k
Λ λ	lámbda, lámda, lábda, λάμβδα, λάμδα, λάβδα (Note: The letter Λ is almost universally known today as lambda (λάμβδα) except in Modern Greek and in Unicode, where it is lamda (λάμδα), and the most common name for it during the Greek Classical Period (510–323 BC) appears to have been labda (λάβδα), without the μ.)	[l]			l	
Μ μ	my, μυ	[m]			m	
Ν ν	ny, νυ	[n]			n	
Ξ ξ	xi, ξι	[ks]			x	
Ο ο	ómikron, όμικρον	[o]			o	
Π π	pi, πι	[p]			p	
Ρ ρ	ro, ρο	[r] ~ [ɾ]			r	
Σ σ/ς (Note: The letter sigma ⟨Σ⟩ has two different lowercase forms in its standard variant, with ⟨ς⟩ being used in word-final position and ⟨σ⟩ elsewhere. In some 19th-century typesetting, ⟨ς⟩ was also used word-medially at the end of a compound morpheme, e.g. δυςκατανοήτων, marking the morpheme boundary between δυς-κατανοήτων ('difficult to understand'); modern standard practice is to spell δυσκατανοήτων with a non-final sigma.)	sígma, σίγμα	[s] [z] before β, γ, or μ			s	
Τ τ	tau, ταυ	[t]			t	
Υ υ	ýpsilon, ύψιλον	Short: [y] Long: [yː]	[i]		y	y
Φ φ	phi, φι	[pʰ]	[f]		ph	f
Χ χ	chi, χι	[kʰ]	[x] before [a], [o], [u] and consonant	[ç] before [e], [i]	ch	ch
Ψ ψ	psi, ψι	[ps]			ps	
Ω ω	ōméga, ωμέγα	[ɔː]	[o]		ō	ō

Examples

== Digraphs and diphthongs ==
A digraph is a pair of letters used to write one sound or a combination of sounds that does not correspond to the written letters in sequence. The orthography of Greek includes several digraphs, including various pairs of vowel letters that used to be pronounced as diphthongs but have been shortened to monophthongs in pronunciation. Many of these are characteristic developments of modern Greek, but some were already present in Classical Greek. None of them is regarded as a letter of the alphabet.

During the Byzantine period, it became customary to write the silent iota in digraphs as an iota subscript.

Letters	Pronunciation	
Letters	Ancient Greek	Modern Greek
αι, αι	[ai̯]	[e̞]
ει, ει	[iː] earlier [eː]	[i]
οι, οι	[oi̯]	[i]
υι, υι	[yː] (Note: The diphthong υι [yi̯] was monophthongized to [yː] in Classical Attic Greek, but survives in some other contemporary dialects and in early Koine.)	[i]
ᾼ, ᾳ	[aːi̯]	[a] (In polytonic texts)
ηι, ῃ	[ɛːi̯]	[i] (In polytonic texts)
ωι, ῳ	[ɔːi̯]	[o] (In polytonic texts)
ΩΙ, ωι	(absent)	[oi], [oi̯]
αυ, αυ	[au̯]	[av] before vowel or voiced consonant; [af] otherwise
Ᾱυ, ᾱυ	[aːu̯]	[absent]
ευ, ευ	[eu̯]	[ev] before vowel or voiced consonant; [ef] otherwise
ηυ, ηυ	[ɛːu̯]	[iv] before vowel or voiced consonant; [if] otherwise
ου, ου	[uː] earlier [oː]	[u]
ωυ, ωυ	[ɔːu̯] (Note: The diphthong ωυ [ɔːu̯] was found in Ionic and in certain Hebrew transcriptions in the Greek Bible, but it did not occur in Attic, and was gradually lost in Koine. Where ωυ was atticized, it was often split into two separate syllables [ɔː.y], hence the Latin transcription ōy. Perhaps the clearest example of this is the Biblical Greek name Μωυσῆς [mɔːu̯.sɛ̂ːs] (Moses), which was atticized as Μωϋσῆς [mɔː.y.sɛ̂ːs], then adapted to early Christian Latin as Mōysēs, from where it became Spanish Moisés, French Moïse, etc. The modern Greek form is Μωυσής [mo̞i̯ˈsis], whereas the modern Latin Vulgate form is Mōsēs.)	[oi], [oi̯]
αϊ, αϊ	[a.i]	[a.i], [ai̯]
ΑΗ, αη	[aɛː]	[a.i], [ai̯]
ΑΫ, αϋ	[a.y]	[a.i], [ai̯]
εϊ, εϊ	[e.i]	[e.i]
ΕΗ, εη	[eɛː]	[e.i]
οϊ, οϊ	[o.i]	[oi], [oi̯]
οη, οη	[oɛː]	[oi], [oi̯]
ωη, ωη	[ɔːɛː]	[oi], [oi̯]
γγ, γγ	[ŋɡ]	[ŋɡ] ~ [ɲɟ] in formal registers, but often reduced to [ɡ] ~ [ɟ] in informal speech; also pronounced [ŋɣ] ~ [ɲʝ] in some words (e.g. εγγενής, έγγραφο, συγγραφέας) (Note: The velars [ɡ], [k], [ɣ], and [x] are palatalized to [ɟ], [c], [ʝ] and [ç] respectively before the close and mid front vowels [i] and [e̞]. It is discussed among scholars whether the velar nasal [ŋ] (ἄγμα, ágma) should be regarded as an allophone of /n/ or a phoneme in its own right in Greek.)
γκ, γκ	[ŋk]	[ɡ] ~ [ɟ] word-initially and in some loanwords; [ŋɡ] ~ [ɲɟ] otherwise, often reduced to [ɡ] ~ [ɟ] in informal speech
γξ, γξ	[ŋks]	[ŋks]
γχ, γχ	[ŋkʰ]	[ŋx] ~ [ɲç]
μπ, μπ	[mp]	[b] word-initially and in some loanwords; [mb] otherwise, often reduced to [b] in informal speech
ντ, ντ	[nt]	[d] word-initially and in some loanwords; [nd] otherwise, often reduced to [d] in informal speech
ΤΣ, τσ/τς	(absent)	[t͡s]
ΤΖ, τζ	(absent)	[d͡z]

== Hyphenation rules of Standard Modern Greek ==
=== Consonant splitting ===
According to KEME (1983), the splitting of a Modern Greek word into syllables (syllabification) is governed by the following rules:

- C1: A single consonant between two vowels is hyphenated with the succeeding vowel.
- C2: A sequence of two consonants between two vowels is hyphenated with the succeeding vowel, if a Greek word exists that begins with such a consonant sequence. Otherwise the sequence is split into two syllables.
- C3: A sequence of three or more consonants between two vowels is hyphenated with the succeeding vowel, if a Greek word exists that begins with the sequence of the first two consonants. Otherwise it splits; the first consonant being hyphenated with the preceding vowel.

Loanword hyphenation is governed by the same grammar rules as the rest of the Standard Modern Greek language.

=== Vowel splitting ===
The prohibitive hyphenation rules regarding vowel splitting are as follows:

- V1. Double-vowel blends do not split.
- V2. The combinations αυ, ευ, ηυ, αύ, εύ and ηύ do not split.
- V3. Diphthongs do not split.
- V4. Excessive diphthongs do not split.

All of the above rules are negative in that they indicate impermissible hyphen points within particular substrings of consecutive vowels.

== Diacritics ==
Polytonic spelling uses a variety of diacritics to represent aspects of the pronunciation of ancient Greek. Polytonic, along with lowercase letters, became standard in Byzantine Greek, although the ancient distinctions had disappeared, replaced by a simple stress accent. The orthographies of modern Greek, both katharevousa and dhimotiki, used the polytonic system until 1982, when monotonic spelling was introduced. In some conservative contexts, such as the Church, polytonic spellings are still used.

Monotonic orthography, adopted in 1982, replaces the ancient diacritics with just two: the acute accent (tónos, e.g. ί), used to mark the stressed syllable in polysyllabic words, and the diaeresis (dialytiká, e.g. ϊ), which indicates that the vowel is not part of a digraph.

== Punctuation ==
=== In Ancient Greek ===
Ancient Greek was written as scripta continua without spacing or interpuncts. Over time, a variety of symbols appeared. A system of dots credited to Aristophanes of Byzantium was developed in the 3rd century BC: a low dot ⟨.⟩ marked an occasion for a short breath after a short phrase, a middot ⟨·⟩ marked an occasion for a longer breath after a longer passage, and a high dot ⟨˙⟩ marked a full stop at the end of a completed thought. Other writers employed two dot punctuation ⟨⁚⟩ to mark the ends of sentences or changing speakers. Less often, arrangements of three ⟨⁝⟩, four ⟨⁞ or ⁘⟩, and five dots ⟨⁙⟩ appeared. Such interline punctuation could be noted or replaced by a variety of paragraphoi, long marks which trailed between lines of text; these might also mark changes of speakers. Blank lines or various coronides marked the ends of sections. (A separate coronis was used to mark contractions; its early forms looked like an apostrophe between the two elided words.) Over time, the main punctuation came to be a full stop marked by a single dot at varying heights, a partial stop marked by various forms of commas, and the hypodiastole ⟨⸒⟩ and papyrological hyphen ⟨ ͜ ⟩. These served to show whether an ambiguous series of letters should be read as (respectively) a pair of words or as a single word. Later Aristarchus of Samothrace modified this system (see: Aristarchian symbols).

=== In printing ===
Following the advent of printing, most Greek punctuation was gradually standardized with French: the hypodiastole was fully unified with the comma, the comma serves as the decimal point (and in this use is called the hypodiastole) and it also functions as a silent letter in a handful of Greek words, principally distinguishing ό,τι (ó,ti, "whatever") from ότι (óti, "that"). The full stop serves as the thousands separator, and guillemets (εισαγωγικά isagoyika) and em-length quotation dashes (παύλα pavla) typically serve to indicate direct speech. (Note: In informal writing, English-style quotation marks have also become quite common.) When quotations are nested, double apostrophes and turned commas are used for the embedded quotation or word: ⟨«…“…”…»⟩. Right-pointing double guillemets (ομειωματικά omiomatiká) ⟨»⟩ serve as a ditto mark. The principal difference is the Greek question mark ⟨;⟩, which developed a shape so similar to the Latinate semicolon ⟨;⟩ that Unicode decomposes its separate code point identically. The ano teleia middot serves as the Greek semicolon, but is so uncommon that it has often been left off of Greek keyboards.

One of the few places where ano teleia exists is on the Microsoft Windows Polytonic Greek keyboard (having the driver name KBDHEPT.DLL).

The exclamation mark (θαυμαστικό thavmastikó) is mostly used as in English. The hyphen, the brackets, the colon, the ellipsis and the slash are also in use. The slash has the additional function of forming common abbreviations like α/φοί for αδελφοί 'brothers'. The ligature kai (ϗ) is sometimes used for the same function as the English ampersand.

=== In Greek numerals ===
There are special rules for how to write Greek numerals. In modern Greek, a number of changes have been made. Instead of extending an overline over an entire number (like χ̅ξ̅ϛ̅), a keraia (κεραία, lit. "hornlike projection") is placed to its upper right, a development of the short marks formerly used for single numbers and fractions. The modern keraia is a symbol (ʹ) similar to the acute accent (´), but has its own Unicode character, encoded as U+0374. Alexander the Great's father Philip II of Macedon is thus known as Φίλιππος Βʹ in modern Greek. A lower left keraia (Unicode: U+0375, "Greek Lower Numeral Sign") is now standard for identifying thousands: 2015 is represented as ͵ΒΙΕʹ (2000 + 10 + 5).

== See also ==
- Ancient Greek phonology
- Greek braille
- Obelism
- Greek grammar
- Greek language question
- Greek ligatures
- Iota subscript
- Katharevousa
- Modern Greek phonology
- Pronunciation of Ancient Greek in teaching
- Romanization of Greek

== Sources ==
- Holton, David; Mackridge, Peter; Philippaki-Warburton, Irini (1998). Grammatiki tis ellinikis glossas. Athens: Pataki.
- Keller, Andrew; Russell, Stephanie (2012). Learn to Read Greek, Part 1. New Haven, Connecticut and London, England: Yale University Press. ISBN 978-0-300-11589-5.
- Mastronarde, Donald J. (2013). Introduction to Attic Greek (2nd ed.). Berkeley, California, Los Angeles, California, and London, England: University of California Press. ISBN 978-0-520-27571-3. Archived from the original on 2024-10-07.
- Woodard, Roger D. (2008). "Attic Greek". In Woodard, Roger D. (ed.). The ancient languages of Europe. Cambridge: University Press. pp. 14–49. ISBN 9780521684958.
