= Aristarchian symbols =

Marks to annotate ancient Greek texts

Aristarchian symbols are editorial marks developed during the Hellenistic period and the early Roman Empire for annotating then-ancient Greek texts—mainly the works of Homer. They were used to highlight missing text, text which was discrepant between sources, and text which appeared in the wrong place.

Two main types of ancient Greek philological annotations can be distinguished: signs and explicit notes. Aristarchian symbols are signs.

== Early development ==
The first philological sign (σημεῖον) invented by Zenodotos of Ephesos, the first head of the Library of Alexandria, in his edition of Homer, the obelos (ὀβελός), a short horizontal dash that later evolved into the obelus and dagger, marked spurious lines. For this reason, the practice of using signs for textual criticism has been called obelism.

A later librarian, Aristophanes of Byzantium, continued the use of the obelos along with other textual notations like a 'small star' (ἀστερίσκος or asteriskos) for passages that did not make sense. Aristophanes also used the lunate sigma (σίγμα) Ϲ and the antisigma (ἀντίσιγμα) Ͻ for two consecutive and interchangeable lines of the same content.

A system of dots also credited to Aristophanes of Byzantium was developed in the 3rd century BCE. A hypostigme (lit. 'low dot') . marked an occasion for a short breath after a short phrase, a stigme mese (lit. 'middot') (στιγμή) · marked an occasion for a longer breath after a longer passage, and a stigme teleia (lit. 'high dot') ˙ marked a full stop at the end of a completed thought. Other writers employed two dot punctuation ⁚ to mark the ends of sentences or changing speakers. Less often, arrangements of three ⁝, four ⁞ ⁘, and five ⁙ dots appeared.

Aristophanes' student and successor, Aristarchus of Samothrace, introduced a formal system of textual criticism marks including the obelos, asteriskos, and other Aristarchian symbols. In his system, the asteriskos marked lines that were duplicated elsewhere, and when combined with the obelos, indicated lines considered to be spurious duplications.

== System of Aristarchus ==
The number of the philological signs and in some cases their meanings were modified by Aristarchus of Samothrace (220–143 BCE), sixth head of the Alexandrinian Library. He used critical and exegetical signs in his editions of the Homeric poems.

A "dotted lunate sigma" (σίγμα περιεστιγμένον) Ͼ was used by him as an editorial sign indicating that the line so-marked is at an incorrect position in the surrounding text; an antisigma, or "reversed lunate sigma" Ͻ, may also mark an out of place line. A "dotted antisigma" or "dotted reversed sigma" (ἀντίσιγμα περιεστιγμένον) Ͽ indicates the line after which rearrangements should be made, or to variant readings of uncertain priority.

The diple > marked lines whose language or content was perhaps also exegetically noteworthy and pointed to a corresponding explanation in a commentary. The diple periestigmene (διπλῆ περιεστιγμένη) >· a dotted diple pointed to a verse in which Aristarchos' edition differs from that of Zenodotos. He used the obelos added to the asteriskos ⁎- where the repeated line is out of place and the stigme (στιγμή) · indicated suspected spuriousness.

== Continued use in late classical texts ==
Aristarchos's semeia were adopted early on by scholars in Rome, and became the standard philological signs for centuries to follow. Some papyrus fragments contain non-Aristarchian signs whose use was fairly consistent nevertheless. For instance, the so-called ancora, an anchor-shaped diagonal upward and downward pointer ⸔ or ⸕, often marks places where text had been omitted or draws attention to text-critical restoration in the top or bottom margin, respectively.

Three different forms of paragraphos mark.

In addition to no punctuation, many original source texts in ancient Greek were written as an unbroken stream of letters, with no separation between words. The hypodiastole, a curved, comma-like mark ⸒, was used to disambiguate certain homonyms and marked the word-break in a sequence of letters that should be understood as two separate words. Its companion mark, the enotikon (ἐνωτικόν) ‿, served to show that a sequence of letters which might otherwise be read as two separate words, should instead be read as a single word. The paragraphos (see picture, right) marked a division in a text. The coronis ⸎ was used to mark the ends of entire works, or the end of major sections in poetic and prose texts.

== Modern typesetting ==
Nine ancient Greek textual annotation symbols are included in the supplemental punctuation list of ISO IEC standard 10646 for character sets. Unicode encodes several more signs.

== Cultural references ==
The names of the characters Asterix and Obelix in the French comic series The Adventures of Asterix by René Goscinny and Albert Uderzo are derived from the Aristarchian symbols.

== See also ==
- Dagger (typography)
- Comma
- Textual criticism
- Annotation
- Marginalia
- Proofreading marks
