= General Punctuation =

- Range: U+2000..U+206F (112 code points)
- Plane: BMP
- Scripts: Common (109 char.); Inherited (2 char.)
- Symbol sets: Punctuation; Spaces; Format controls
- Assigned: 111 code points
- Unused: 1 reserved code points 6 deprecated

Unicode Version History
- 1.0.0 (1991): 67 (+67)
- 1.1 (1993): 76 (+9)
- 3.0 (1999): 83 (+7)
- 3.2 (2002): 95 (+12)
- 4.0 (2003): 97 (+2)
- 4.1 (2005): 106 (+9)
- 5.1 (2008): 107 (+1)
- 6.3 (2013): 111 (+4)

Unicode documentation
- Code chart ∣ Web page

General Punctuation is a Unicode block containing punctuation, spacing, and formatting characters for use with all scripts and writing systems. Included are the defined-width spaces, joining formats, directional formats, smart quotes, archaic and novel punctuation such as the interrobang, and invisible mathematical operators.

Additional punctuation characters are in the Supplemental Punctuation block and sprinkled in dozens of other Unicode blocks.

== Block ==
General Punctuation^{[1]}^{[2]}^{[3]} Official Unicode Consortium code chart (PDF)
	0	1	2	3	4	5	6	7	8	9	A	B	C	D	E	F
U+200x	NQ; SP	MQ; SP	EN; SP	EM; SP	3/M; SP	4/M; SP	6/M; SP	F SP	P SP	TH; SP	H SP	ZW; SP	ZW; NJ	ZW; J	LRM	RLM
U+201x	‐	NB ‑	‒	–	—	―	‖	‗	‘	’	‚	‛	“	”	„	‟
U+202x	†	‡	•	‣	․	‥	…	‧	L SEP	P SEP	LRE	RLE	PDF	LRO	RLO	NNB; SP
U+203x	‰	‱	′	″	‴	‵	‶	‷	‸	‹	›	※	‼	‽	‾	‿
U+204x	⁀	⁁	⁂	⁃	/	⁅	⁆	⁇	⁈	⁉	⁊	⁋	⁌	⁍	⁎	⁏
U+205x	⁐	⁑	⁒	⁓	⁔	⁕	⁖	⁗	⁘	⁙	⁚	⁛	⁜	⁝	⁞	MM; SP
U+206x	WJ	ƒ()	×	,	+		LRI	RLI	FSI	PDI	I SS	A SS	I AFS	A AFS	NA; DS	NO; DS
Notes 1.As of Unicode version 17.0 2.Grey area indicates non-assigned code point 3.Unicode code points U+206A – U+206F are deprecated as of Unicode version 3.0

Several characters in this block are usually not rendered with a directly visible glyph. Ten whitespace characters—U+2002 through U+200B (fixed en or 1/2 em, em, 1/3 em, 1/4 em, 1/6 em, figure and punctuation space, variable thin or 1/5 em and hair space, fixed zero-width space)—and U+205F (math medium or 2/9 em space) differ by horizontal width, while U+2000 and U+2001 (en and em quad) are effectively aliases of U+2002 and U+2003, respectively; another two, U+202F and U+2060 (ill-termed word joiner), are variants of U+2009 or U+2004 and U+200B that prohibit line breaks. Three zero-width characters, U+200B through U+200D (space, non-joiner and joiner), differ in how they affect ligation and shaping of adjacent letters such as contextual forms in Arabic. Eleven invisible characters—U+200E, U+200F (left-to-right and right-to-left mark), U+202A through U+202E (embeds, pops and overrides) and U+2066 through U+2069 (isolates)—control the directionality of text unless higher-level markup overrides them. There are explicit line and paragraph separators at U+2028 and U+2029.

== Variation selectors ==
This block has variation sequences defined for East Asian punctuation positional variants of the curly quotation marks ‘...’ and “...”. U+FE00 VARIATION SELECTOR-1 (VS01) and U+FE01 VARIATION SELECTOR-2 (VS02) are used for East Asian punctuation positional variants. U+FE02 VARIATION SELECTOR-3 (VS03) is used for Sibe positional variants.

Variation sequences for fullwidth quotation marks
U+	2018	2019	201C	201D	Description
base code point	‘	’	“	”	
base + VS01	‘︀	’︀	“︀	”︀	non-fullwidth form
base + VS02	‘︁	’︁	“︁	”︁	justified fullwidth form
base + VS03	‘︂	’︂	“︂	”︂	Sibe form

The non-fullwidth forms are expected to be separated with a space on one side, the fullwidth forms are not:

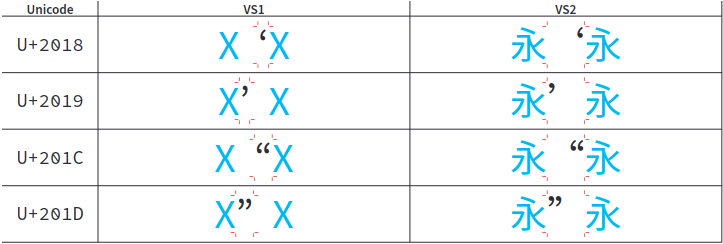
The red registration corners mark the glyph metrics and show how the glyph aligns within the space allotted to the character. For variable-width display (left), an adjacent space is expected; for full-width CJK display (right), a space is not necessary.

In vertical text, the fullwidth forms should display somewhat differently, and even as regular CJK quotation marks 「...」 and 『...』 if the vertical orientation property is set to "Hans":

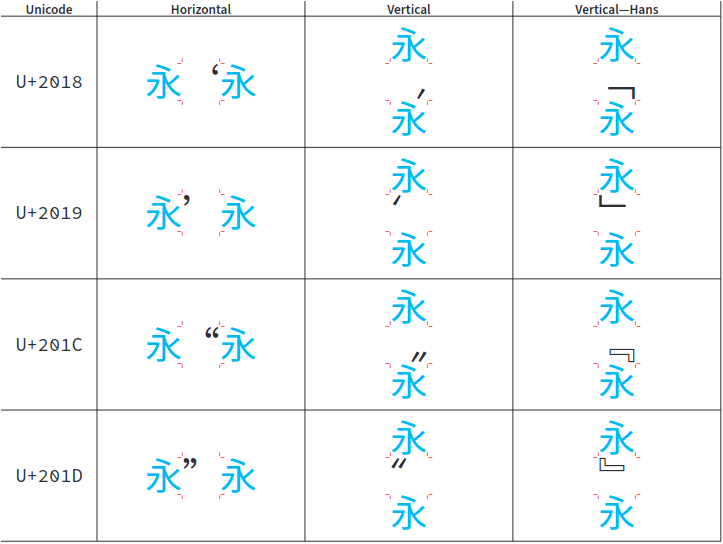
CJK behaviour of generic quotation marks in horizontal and vertical text when variation selector VS02 is appended. The 'horizontal' column at left is the 'VS2' column of the preceding table.

== Emoji ==
The General Punctuation block contains two emoji: U+203C and U+2049.

The block has four standardized variants defined to specify emoji-style (U+FE0F VS16) or text presentation (U+FE0E VS15) for the two emoji, both of which default to a text presentation.

Emoji variation sequences
U+	203C	2049
base code point	‼	⁉
base+VS15 (text)	‼︎	⁉︎
base+VS16 (emoji)	‼️	⁉️

== History ==
The following Unicode-related documents record the purpose and process of defining specific characters in the General Punctuation block:

Version	Final code points (Note: Proposed code points and characters names may differ from final code points and names)	Count	UTC ID	L2 ID	WG2 ID	Document
1.0.0	U+2000..202E, 2030..203E, 2040..2044	67				(to be determined)
1.0.0	U+2000..202E, 2030..203E, 2040..2044	67		L2/11-438 (Note: See also L2/10-458, L2/11-414, L2/11-415, and L2/11-429) (Note: Refer to the history section of the Miscellaneous Symbols and Pictographs block for additional emoji-related documents)	N4182	Edberg, Peter (2011-12-22), Emoji Variation Sequences (Revision of L2/11-429)
1.0.0	U+2000..202E, 2030..203E, 2040..2044	67		L2/17-086		Burge, Jeremy; et al. (2017-03-27), Add ZWJ, VS-16, Keycaps & Tags to Emoji_Component
1.0.0	U+2000..202E, 2030..203E, 2040..2044	67		L2/17-103		Moore, Lisa (2017-05-18), "E.1.7 Add ZWJ, VS-16, Keycaps & Tags to Emoji_Component", UTC #151 Minutes
1.0.0	U+2000..202E, 2030..203E, 2040..2044	67		L2/21-009		Moore, Lisa (2021-01-27), "16 [Affects U+2018-201D]", UTC #166 Minutes
1.0.0	U+2000..202E, 2030..203E, 2040..2044	67		L2/23-212R		Lunde, Ken (2023-10-14), Proposal to add standardized variation sequences for four quotation marks [Affects U+2018, 2019, 201C, and 201D]
1.0.0	U+2000..202E, 2030..203E, 2040..2044	67		L2/23-238R		Anderson, Deborah; Kučera, Jan; Whistler, Ken; Pournader, Roozbeh; Constable, Peter (2023-11-01), "15 Symbols (Punctuation): Quotation Marks [Affects U+2018, 2019, 201C, and 201D]", Recommendations to UTC #177 November 2023 on Script Proposals
1.0.0	U+2000..202E, 2030..203E, 2040..2044	67		L2/23-231		Constable, Peter (2023-12-08), "Consensus 177-C36", UTC #177 Minutes, "Add ... eight standardized variation sequences, based on L2/23-212R [Affects U+2018, 2019, 201C, and 201D]"
1.0.0	U+2000..202E, 2030..203E, 2040..2044	67		L2/25-028		Sim, CheonHyeong (2025-01-08), Proposal to Add VS3 for Sibe Quotation Marks [Affects U+2018, 2019, 201C, and 201D]
1.0.0	U+2000..202E, 2030..203E, 2040..2044	67		L2/25-010		Kučera, Jan; et al. (2025-01-16), "6.7 Sibe Quotation Marks [Affects U+2018, 2019, 201C, and 201D]", Recommendations to UTC #182 (January 2025) on Script Proposals
1.0.0	U+2000..202E, 2030..203E, 2040..2044	67		L2/25-003		Leroy, Robin (2025-01-28), "Consensus: 182-C33 [Affects U+2018, 2019, 201C, and 201D]", UTC #182 Minutes, "Accept the proposal to add [...] four standardized variation sequences"
1.1	U+203F, 2045..2046	3				(to be determined)
1.1	U+206A..206F	6				(to be determined)
1.1	U+206A..206F	6	UTC/1992-xxx			Freytag, Asmus (1992-05-12), "C. Bidi", Unconfirmed minutes for UTC Meeting #52, May 8, 1992 at Xerox
1.1	U+206A..206F	6		L2/01-275		Davis, Mark (2001-07-16), New Properties (ReservedForCf, Deprecated, Discouraged)
1.1	U+206A..206F	6		L2/01-301		Whistler, Ken (2001-08-01), "Alternate format controls inherited from 10646", Analysis of Character Deprecation in the Unicode Standard
1.1	U+206A..206F	6		L2/01-326		Davis, Mark (2001-08-15), New Properties: Reserved_Cf_Code_Point & Deprecated
1.1	U+206A..206F	6		L2/01-295R		Moore, Lisa (2001-11-06), "Motion 88-M13", Minutes from the UTC/L2 meeting #88
3.0	U+202F, 2048..2049	3		L2/97-288	N1603	Umamaheswaran, V. S. (1997-10-24), "8.18", Unconfirmed Meeting Minutes, WG 2 Meeting # 33, Heraklion, Crete, Greece, 20 June – 4 July 1997
3.0	U+202F, 2048..2049	3		L2/98-088	N1711	The Working Meeting on Mongolian Encoding Attended by Representatives of China and Mongolia, 1998-02-15
3.0	U+202F, 2048..2049	3		L2/98-104	N1734	Whistler, Ken (1998-03-20), Comments on the Mongolian Encoding Proposal, WG2 N1711
3.0	U+202F, 2048..2049	3		L2/98-252 (pdf, txt)	N1833RM (pdf, doc)	Moore, Richard (1998-05-04), Feedback on Ken Whistler's Comments on Mongolian Encoding: N 1734
3.0	U+202F, 2048..2049	3		L2/98-251 (pdf, html, txt)	N1808 (pdf, doc)	Reply to "Proposal WG2 N1734" Raised at the Seattle Meeting Regarding "Proposal WG 2 N1711", 1998-07-09
3.0	U+202F, 2048..2049	3		L2/98-281R (pdf, html)		Aliprand, Joan (1998-07-31), "Mongolian (IV.A)", Unconfirmed Minutes – UTC #77 & NCITS Subgroup L2 # 174 JOINT MEETING, Redmond, WA -- July 29-31, 1998
3.0	U+202F, 2048..2049	3			N1862	Revision of N1711 - Mongolian, 1998-09-17
3.0	U+202F, 2048..2049	3			N1865	US Position - Mongolian (N1711, N1734 and N1808), 1998-09-18
3.0	U+202F, 2048..2049	3			N1918	Paterson, Bruce (1998-10-28), Text for Combined PDAM registration and consideration ballot - SC2 N 3208
3.0	U+202F, 2048..2049	3		L2/99-010	N1903 (pdf, html, doc)	Umamaheswaran, V. S. (1998-12-30), "8.1.3", Minutes of WG 2 meeting 35, London, U.K.; 1998-09-21--25
3.0	U+202F, 2048..2049	3		L2/99-075.1	N1973	Irish Comments on SC 2 N 3208, 1999-01-19
3.0	U+202F, 2048..2049	3		L2/99-075	N1972 (pdf, html, doc)	Summary of Voting on SC 2 N 3208, PDAM ballot on WD for ISO/IEC 10646-1/Amd. 29: Mongolian, 1999-02-12
3.0	U+202F, 2048..2049	3			N2020	Paterson, Bruce (1999-04-05), FPDAM 29 Text - Mongolian
3.0	U+202F, 2048..2049	3		L2/99-113		Text for FPDAM ballot of ISO/IEC 10646, Amd. 29 - Mongolian, 1999-04-06
3.0	U+202F, 2048..2049	3		L2/99-232	N2003	Umamaheswaran, V. S. (1999-08-03), "6.1.3 PDAM29 – Mongolian script", Minutes of WG 2 meeting 36, Fukuoka, Japan, 1999-03-09--15
3.0	U+202F, 2048..2049	3		L2/99-304	N2126	Paterson, Bruce (1999-10-01), Revised Text for FDAM ballot of ISO/IEC 10646-1/FDAM 29, AMENDMENT 29: Mongolian
3.0	U+202F, 2048..2049	3		L2/99-381		Final text for ISO/IEC 10646-1, FDAM 29 -- Mongolian, 1999-12-07
3.0	U+202F, 2048..2049	3		L2/00-010	N2103	Umamaheswaran, V. S. (2000-01-05), "6.4.4", Minutes of WG 2 meeting 37, Copenhagen, Denmark: 1999-09-13—16
3.0	U+202F, 2048..2049	3		L2/07-209		Whistler, Ken (2007-07-05), UTR 14 and U+202F NARROW NO-BREAK SPACE
3.0	U+202F, 2048..2049	3		L2/11-438	N4182	Edberg, Peter (2011-12-22), Emoji Variation Sequences (Revision of L2/11-429)
3.0	U+202F, 2048..2049	3		L2/15-187		Moore, Lisa (2015-08-11), "B.14.5", UTC #144 Minutes
3.0	U+202F, 2048..2049	3		L2/16-258	N4752R2	Eck, Greg (2016-09-19), Mongolian Base Forms, Positional Forms, & Variant Forms
3.0	U+202F, 2048..2049	3		L2/16-259	N4753	Eck, Greg; Rileke, Orlog Ou (2016-09-20), WG2 #65 Mongolian Discussion Points
3.0	U+202F, 2048..2049	3		L2/16-266	N4763	Anderson, Deborah; Whistler, Ken; McGowan, Rick; Pournader, Roozbeh; Glass, Andrew; Iancu, Laurențiu; Moore, Lisa (2016-09-26), "1. Mongolian", Comments on Mongolian, Small Khitan, and other WG2 #65 documents
3.0	U+202F, 2048..2049	3		L2/16-297	N4769	Anderson, Deborah (2016-10-27), Mongolian ad hoc report
3.0	U+204A	1		L2/98-214	N1747	Everson, Michael (1998-05-25), Contraction characters for the UCS
3.0	U+204A	1		L2/98-281R (pdf, html)		Aliprand, Joan (1998-07-31), "Characters from ISO 5426-2 (IV.C.5-6)", Unconfirmed Minutes – UTC #77 & NCITS Subgroup L2 # 174 JOINT MEETING, Redmond, WA -- July 29-31, 1998
3.0	U+204A	1		L2/98-292R (pdf, html, Figure 1)		"2.6", Comments on proposals to add characters from ISO standards developed by ISO/TC 46/SC 4, 1998-08-19
3.0	U+204A	1		L2/98-292	N1840	"2.6", Comments on proposals to add characters from ISO standards developed by ISO/TC 46/SC 4, 1998-08-25
3.0	U+204A	1		L2/98-301	N1847	Everson, Michael (1998-09-12), Responses to NCITS/L2 and Unicode Consortium comments on numerous proposals
3.0	U+204A	1		L2/98-372	N1884R2 (pdf, doc)	Whistler, Ken; et al. (1998-09-22), Additional Characters for the UCS
3.0	U+204A	1		L2/98-329	N1920	Combined PDAM registration and consideration ballot on WD for ISO/IEC 10646-1/Amd. 30, AMENDMENT 30: Additional Latin and other characters, 1998-10-28
3.0	U+204A	1		L2/99-010	N1903 (pdf, html, doc)	Umamaheswaran, V. S. (1998-12-30), "8.1.5.1", Minutes of WG 2 meeting 35, London, U.K.; 1998-09-21--25
3.0	U+204B..204D	3		L2/98-215	N1748	Everson, Michael (1998-05-25), Additional signature mark characters for the UCS
3.0	U+204B..204D	3		L2/98-281R (pdf, html)		Aliprand, Joan (1998-07-31), "Signature Marks (IV.C.7)", Unconfirmed Minutes – UTC #77 & NCITS Subgroup L2 # 174 JOINT MEETING, Redmond, WA -- July 29-31, 1998
3.0	U+204B..204D	3		L2/98-292R (pdf, html, Figure 1)		"2.7", Comments on proposals to add characters from ISO standards developed by ISO/TC 46/SC 4, 1998-08-19
3.0	U+204B..204D	3		L2/98-292	N1840	"2.7", Comments on proposals to add characters from ISO standards developed by ISO/TC 46/SC 4, 1998-08-25
3.0	U+204B..204D	3		L2/98-301	N1847	Everson, Michael (1998-09-12), Responses to NCITS/L2 and Unicode Consortium comments on numerous proposals
3.0	U+204B..204D	3		L2/98-372	N1884R2 (pdf, doc)	Whistler, Ken; et al. (1998-09-22), Additional Characters for the UCS
3.0	U+204B..204D	3		L2/98-329	N1920	Combined PDAM registration and consideration ballot on WD for ISO/IEC 10646-1/Amd. 30, AMENDMENT 30: Additional Latin and other characters, 1998-10-28
3.0	U+204B..204D	3		L2/99-010	N1903 (pdf, html, doc)	Umamaheswaran, V. S. (1998-12-30), "8.1.5.1", Minutes of WG 2 meeting 35, London, U.K.; 1998-09-21--25
3.2	U+2047, 2051	2		L2/99-238		Consolidated document containing 6 Japanese proposals, 1999-07-15
3.2	U+2047, 2051	2			N2092	Addition of forty eight characters, 1999-09-13
3.2	U+2047, 2051	2		L2/99-365		Moore, Lisa (1999-11-23), Comments on JCS Proposals
3.2	U+2047, 2051	2		L2/00-024		Shibano, Kohji (2000-01-31), JCS proposal revised
3.2	U+2047, 2051	2		L2/99-260R		Moore, Lisa (2000-02-07), "JCS Proposals", Minutes of the UTC/L2 meeting in Mission Viejo, October 26-28, 1999
3.2	U+2047, 2051	2		L2/00-098, L2/00-098-page5	N2195	Rationale for non-Kanji characters proposed by JCS committee, 2000-03-15
3.2	U+2047, 2051	2		L2/00-119 (Note: Refer to the history section of the Miscellaneous Mathematical Symbols-B block for additional math-related documents)	N2191R	Whistler, Ken; Freytag, Asmus (2000-04-19), Encoding Additional Mathematical Symbols in Unicode
3.2	U+2047, 2051	2		L2/00-234	N2203 (rtf, txt)	Umamaheswaran, V. S. (2000-07-21), "8.18, 8.20", Minutes from the SC2/WG2 meeting in Beijing, 2000-03-21 -- 24
3.2	U+2047, 2051	2		L2/00-115R2		Moore, Lisa (2000-08-08), "Motion 83-M11", Minutes Of UTC Meeting #83
3.2	U+2047, 2051	2		L2/00-297	N2257	Sato, T. K. (2000-09-04), JIS X 0213 symbols part-1
3.2	U+2047, 2051	2		L2/00-342	N2278	Sato, T. K.; Everson, Michael; Whistler, Ken; Freytag, Asmus (2000-09-20), Ad hoc Report on Japan feedback N2257 and N2258
3.2	U+2047, 2051	2		L2/01-050	N2253	Umamaheswaran, V. S. (2001-01-21), "7.16 JIS X0213 Symbols", Minutes of the SC2/WG2 meeting in Athens, September 2000
3.2	U+204E..2050, 2057, 205F, 2061..2062	7		L2/00-005R2		Moore, Lisa (2000-02-14), "Motion 82-M11", Minutes of UTC #82 in San Jose
3.2	U+204E..2050, 2057, 205F, 2061..2062	7		L2/00-119	N2191R	Whistler, Ken; Freytag, Asmus (2000-04-19), Encoding Additional Mathematical Symbols in Unicode
3.2	U+204E..2050, 2057, 205F, 2061..2062	7		L2/00-234	N2203 (rtf, txt)	Umamaheswaran, V. S. (2000-07-21), "8.18", Minutes from the SC2/WG2 meeting in Beijing, 2000-03-21 -- 24
3.2	U+204E..2050, 2057, 205F, 2061..2062	7		L2/00-115R2		Moore, Lisa (2000-08-08), "Motion 83-M11", Minutes Of UTC Meeting #83
3.2	U+2052, 2063	2		L2/01-142	N2336	Beeton, Barbara; Freytag, Asmus; Ion, Patrick (2001-04-02), Additional Mathematical Symbols
3.2	U+2052, 2063	2		L2/01-156	N2356	Freytag, Asmus (2001-04-03), Additional Mathematical Characters (Draft 10)
3.2	U+2052, 2063	2		L2/01-344	N2353 (pdf, doc)	Umamaheswaran, V. S. (2001-09-09), "7.7 Mathematical Symbols", Minutes from SC2/WG2 meeting #40 -- Mountain View, April 2001
3.2	U+2060	1		L2/99-260R		Moore, Lisa (2000-02-07), "Unicode in Markup Languages", Minutes of the UTC/L2 meeting in Mission Viejo, October 26-28, 1999
3.2	U+2060	1		L2/00-005R2		Moore, Lisa (2000-02-14), "Zero Width Grapheme Break/Join", Minutes of UTC #82 in San Jose, "Action Item for Arnold Winkler: As the zero width grapheme break/join proposal was withdrawn, re-open Action Item 81-12 (for Mark Davis to prepare a proposal for WG2 for the Zero Width Word Joiner.)"
3.2	U+2060	1		L2/00-258	N2235	Davis, Mark (2000-08-09), Proposal for addition of ZERO WIDTH WORD JOINER
3.2	U+2060	1		L2/00-369		Whistler, Ken (2000-10-06), "e. (ZERO WIDTH) WORD JOINER", WG2 in Vouliagmeni (Athens)
3.2	U+2060	1		L2/01-050	N2253	Umamaheswaran, V. S. (2001-01-21), "7.7 Proposal for addition of ZERO WIDTH WORDJOINER", Minutes of the SC2/WG2 meeting in Athens, September 2000
4.0	U+2053..2054	2		L2/02-141	N2419	Everson, Michael; et al. (2002-03-20), Uralic Phonetic Alphabet characters for the UCS
4.0	U+2053..2054	2		L2/02-192		Everson, Michael (2002-05-02), Everson's Reply on UPA
4.0	U+2053..2054	2			N2442	Everson, Michael; Kolehmainen, Erkki I.; Ruppel, Klaas; Trosterud, Trond (2002-05-21), Justification for placing the Uralic Phonetic Alphabet in the BMP
4.0	U+2053..2054	2		L2/02-291		Whistler, Ken (2002-05-31), WG2 report from Dublin
4.0	U+2053..2054	2		L2/02-292		Whistler, Ken (2002-06-03), Early look at WG2 consent docket
4.0	U+2053..2054	2		L2/02-166R2		Moore, Lisa (2002-08-09), "Scripts and New Characters - UPA", UTC #91 Minutes
4.0	U+2053..2054	2		L2/02-253		Moore, Lisa (2002-10-21), "Consensus 92-C2", UTC #92 Minutes
4.1	U+2055	1		L2/03-151R		Constable, Peter; Lloyd-Williams, James; Lloyd-Williams, Sue; Chowdhury, Shamsul Islam; Ali, Asaddar; Sadique, Mohammed; Chowdhury, Matiar Rahman (2003-05-10), Revised Proposal for Encoding Syloti Nagri Script in the BMP
4.1	U+2055	1		L2/03-136		Moore, Lisa (2003-08-18), "Scripts and New Characters - Syloti Nagri Script", UTC #95 Minutes
4.1	U+2056, 2058..2059	3		L2/03-282R	N2610R	Everson, Michael; Cleminson, Ralph (2003-09-04), Final proposal for encoding the Glagolitic script in the UCS
4.1	U+2056, 2058..2059	3		L2/03-324	N2642	Pantelia, Maria (2003-10-06), Proposal to encode additional Greek editorial and punctuation characters in the UCS
4.1	U+205A..205C	3		L2/03-157		Pantelia, Maria (2003-05-19), Additional Beta Code Characters not in Unicode (WIP)
4.1	U+205A..205C	3		L2/03-193R	N2612-7	Pantelia, Maria (2003-06-11), Proposal to encode additional Punctuation Characters in the UCS
4.1	U+205D	1		L2/02-312R		Pantelia, Maria (2002-11-07), Proposal to encode additional Greek editorial and punctuation characters in the UCS
4.1	U+205D	1		L2/03-324	N2642	Pantelia, Maria (2003-10-06), Proposal to encode additional Greek editorial and punctuation characters in the UCS
4.1	U+205E	1		L2/03-354	N2655	Freytag, Asmus (2003-10-10), Proposal -- Symbols used in Dictionaries
4.1	U+205E	1		L2/03-356R2		Moore, Lisa (2003-10-22), "Consensus 97-C15", UTC #97 Minutes
5.1	U+2064	1		L2/07-011R	N3198R	Freytag, Asmus; Beeton, Barbara; Ion, Patrick; Sargent, Murray; Carlisle, David; Pournader, Roozbeh (2007-01-15), 29 Additional Mathematical and Symbol Characters
5.1	U+2064	1		L2/07-015		Moore, Lisa (2007-02-08), "Mathematical Characters and Symbols (C.4)", UTC #110 Minutes
5.1	U+2064	1		L2/07-268	N3253 (pdf, doc)	Umamaheswaran, V. S. (2007-07-26), "M50.16", Unconfirmed minutes of WG 2 meeting 50, Frankfurt-am-Main, Germany; 2007-04-24/27
6.3	U+2066..2069	4		L2/12-186R		Lanin, Aharon; Davis, Mark; Pournader, Roozbeh (2012-07-24), A Proposal for Bidi Isolates in Unicode
6.3	U+2066..2069	4		L2/12-290	N4310	Lanin, Aharon; Davis, Mark; Pournader, Roozbeh (2012-07-31), Proposal for Four Characters for Bidi
6.3	U+2066..2069	4		L2/12-239		Moore, Lisa (2012-08-14), "Consensus 132-C12", UTC #132 Minutes
6.3	U+2066..2069	4		L2/13-040		Pournader, Roozbeh; Lanin, Aharon (2013-01-29), Fasttracking Arabic Letter Mark (ALM)
6.3	U+2066..2069	4		L2/13-125	N4447	Constable, Peter (2013-06-10), Unicode Liaison Report to WG2
