= Obelism =

Editors' marks on manuscripts

Three basic variants of dotted obelos glyphs

Obelism is the practice of annotating manuscripts with marks set in the margins. Modern obelisms are used by editors when proofreading a manuscript or typescript. Examples are "stet" (which is Latin for "Let it stand", used in this context to mean "disregard the previous mark") and "dele" (for "Delete").

The obelos symbol (see obelus) gets its name from the spit, or sharp end of a lance in ancient Greek. An obelos was placed by editors on the margins of manuscripts, especially in Homer, to indicate lines that may not have been written by Homer. The system was developed by Aristarchus and notably used later by Origen in his Hexapla. Origen marked spurious words with an opening obelus and a closing metobelos ("end of obelus").

There were many other such shorthand symbols, to indicate corrections, emendations, deletions, additions, and so on. Most used are the editorial coronis, the paragraphos, the forked paragraphos, the reversed forked paragraphos, the hypodiastole, the downwards ancora, the upwards ancora, and the dotted right-pointing angle, which is also known as the diple periestigmene. Loosely, all these symbols, and the act of annotation by means of them, are obelism.

These nine ancient Greek textual annotation symbols are also included in the supplemental punctuation list of ISO/IEC 10646 standard for character sets.

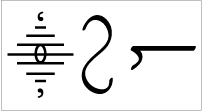
The coronis marked subsections.

The paragraphos was used for breaks.

The hypodiastole separated words before the use of spaces.

The dotted diple was also used for dubious lines.

== Modern encoding ==
Unicode encodes the following:

- U+2058 ⁘ FOUR DOT PUNCTUATION (used as an obelism)
- U+2059 ⁙ FIVE DOT PUNCTUATION (In this context, the Greek pentonkion)
- U+205A ⁚ TWO DOT PUNCTUATION (used as an obelism)
- U+205B ⁛ FOUR DOT MARK
- U+205C ⁜ DOTTED CROSS
- U+2E0E ⸎ EDITORIAL CORONIS
- U+2E0F ⸏ PARAGRAPHOS
- U+2E10 ⸐ FORKED PARAGRAPHOS
- U+2E11 ⸑ REVERSED FORKED PARAGRAPHOS
- U+2E12 ⸒ HYPODIASTOLE
- U+2E13 ⸓ DOTTED OBELOS
- U+2E14 ⸔ DOWNWARDS ANCORA
- U+2E15 ⸕ UPWARDS ANCORA
- U+2E16 ⸖ DOTTED RIGHT-POINTING ANGLE (diple periestigmene)

Some of these were also used in Ancient Greek punctuation as word dividers. The two-dot punctuation is used as a word separator in the Old Turkic script.

== See also ==
- Annotation – Item of metadata attached to a document
- Aristarchian symbols – Marks to annotate ancient Greek texts
- Dagger (mark) – Typographical symbol (†). A horizontal form of the dagger mark was used an obelus.
- Diple (textual symbol) – Symbol used in margins of Greek manuscripts to draw attention to something in text
- Marginalia – Marks made in margins of book pages
- List of proofreader's marks
- General Punctuation – Unicode block containing punctuation, spacing, and formatting characters
