= Obelos =

Obelos may refer to:

- Obol (coin), a coin in Ancient Greece
- Obelus, a historical typographic mark
