= Greek grammar =

Greek grammar may refer to:

- Ancient Greek grammar
- Koine Greek grammar
- Modern Greek grammar
