= Word divider =

Glyph that separates written words

	·	፡
space	Latin interpunct	Geʽez double point

In punctuation, a word divider is a glyph whose purpose is to separate words. In languages which use the Latin, Cyrillic, and Arabic scripts, as well as other scripts of Europe and West Asia, the word divider is a blank space, or whitespace. However, there are a number of other word divider characters in use as well, either currently or historically. For example, the interpunct, · often used in Latin inscriptions.

In character encoding, word segmentation depends on which characters are defined as word dividers.

== History ==
In Ancient Egyptian, determinatives may have been used as much to demarcate word boundaries as to disambiguate the semantics of words. Rarely in Assyrian cuneiform, but commonly in the later cuneiform Ugaritic alphabet, a vertical stroke 𒑰 was used to separate words. In Old Persian cuneiform, a diagonally sloping wedge 𐏐 was used.

As the alphabet spread throughout the ancient world, words were often run together without division, and this practice remains or remained until recently in much of South and Southeast Asia. However, not infrequently in inscriptions a vertical line, and in manuscripts a single (·), double (:), or triple (⁝) interpunct (dot) was used to divide words. This practice was found in Phoenician, Aramaic, Hebrew, Greek, Latin, and runes, and continues today with Ethiopic, though there, whitespace is gaining ground.

=== Scriptio continua ===
The early alphabetic writing systems, such as the Phoenician alphabet, had only signs for consonants (although some signs for consonants could also stand for a vowel, so-called matres lectionis). Without some form of visible word dividers, parsing a text into its separate words would have been a puzzle. With the introduction of letters representing vowels in the Greek alphabet, the need for inter-word separation lessened. The earliest Greek inscriptions used interpuncts, as was common in the writing systems which preceded it, but soon the practice of scriptio continua, continuous writing in which all words ran together without separation became common.

== Types ==
=== None ===
Alphabetic writing without inter-word separation, known as scriptio continua, was used in Ancient Egyptian. It appeared in Post-classical Latin after several centuries of the use of the interpunct.

Traditionally, scriptio continua was used for the Indic alphabets of South and Southeast Asia and hangul of Korea, but spacing is now used with hangul and increasingly with the Indic alphabets.

Today Chinese and Japanese are the most widely used scripts consistently written without punctuation to separate words, though other scripts such as Thai and Lao also follow this writing convention. In Classical Chinese, a word and a character were almost the same thing, so that word dividers would have been superfluous. Although Modern Mandarin has numerous polysyllabic words, and each syllable is written with a distinct character, the conceptual link between character and word or at least morpheme remains strong, and no need is felt for word separation apart from what characters already provide. This link is also found in the Vietnamese language; however, in the Vietnamese alphabet, virtually all syllables are separated by spaces, whether or not they form word boundaries.

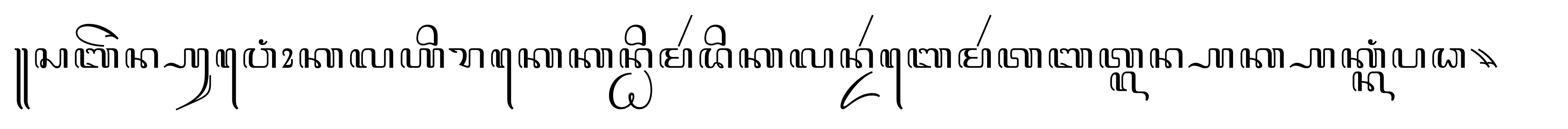
An example of Javanese script scriptio continua of the first article of declaration of human rights.

=== Space ===
Space is the most common word divider, especially in Latin script.

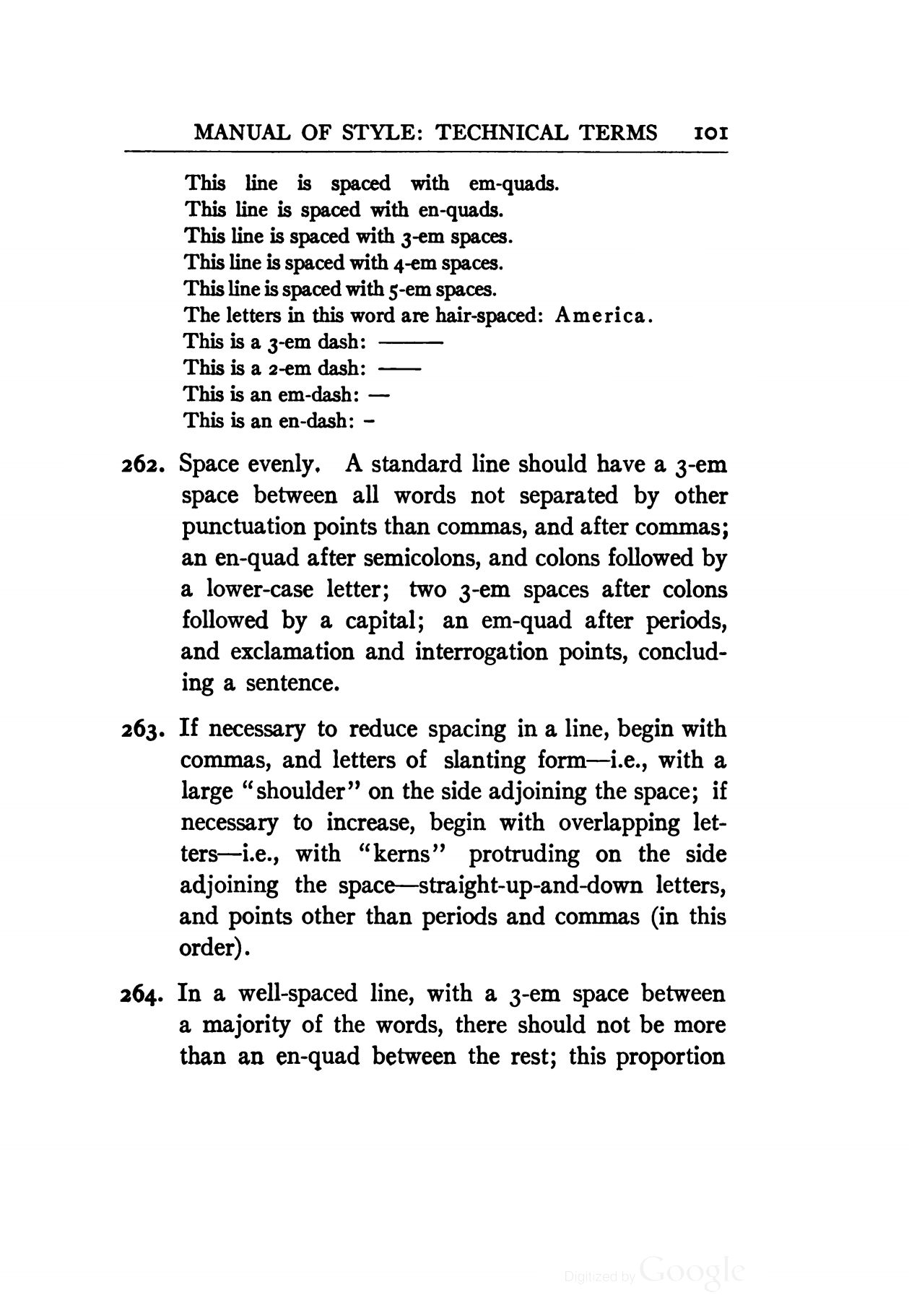
Traditional spacing examples from the 1911 Chicago Manual of Style

=== Vertical lines ===
Ancient inscribed and cuneiform scripts such as Anatolian hieroglyphs frequently used short vertical lines to separate words, as did Linear B. In manuscripts, vertical lines were more commonly used for larger breaks, equivalent to the Latin comma and period. This continues with many Indic scripts today (the danda).

=== Interpunct, multiple dots, and hypodiastole ===
arma·virvmqve·cano·troiae·qvi·primvs·ab·oris
italiam·fato·profvgvs·laviniaqve·venit
litora·mvltvm·ille·et·terris·iactatvs·et·alto
vi·svpervm·saevae·memorem·ivnonis·ob·iram

The Latin interpunct

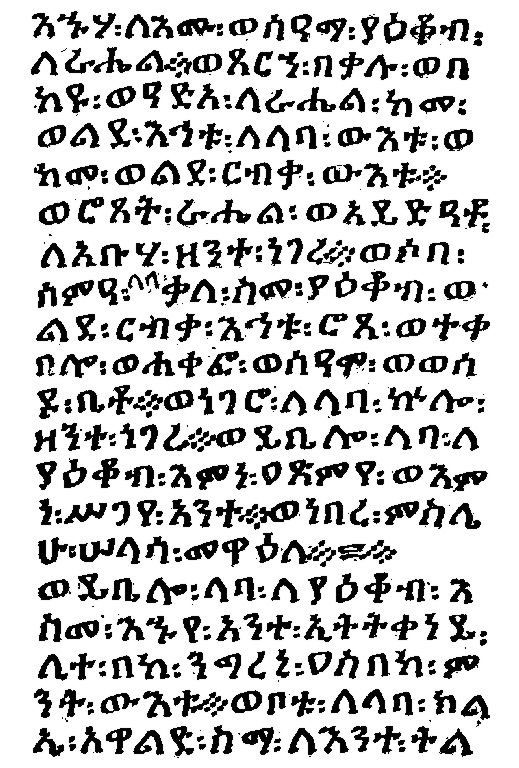
The Ethiopic double interpunct

As noted above, the single and double interpunct were used in manuscripts (on paper) throughout the ancient world. For example, Ethiopic inscriptions used a vertical line, whereas manuscripts used double dots (፡) resembling a colon. The latter practice continues today, though the space is making inroads. Classical Latin used the interpunct in both paper manuscripts and stone inscriptions. Ancient Greek orthography used between two and five dots as word separators, as well as the hypodiastole.

=== Different letter forms ===
In the modern Hebrew and Arabic alphabets, some letters have distinct forms at the ends and/or beginnings of words. This demarcation is used in addition to spacing.

=== Vertical arrangement ===
Nastaʿlīq used for Urdu (written right-to-left)

The Nastaʿlīq form of Islamic calligraphy uses vertical arrangement to separate words. The beginning of each word is written higher than the end of the preceding word, so that a line of text takes on a sawtooth appearance. Nastaliq spread from Persia and today is used for Persian, Uyghur, Pashto, and Urdu.

=== Pause ===
In finger spelling and in Morse code, words are separated by a pause.

== Unicode ==
For use with computers, these marks have codepoints in Unicode:

- See whitespace for many blank characters including U+0020 SPACE.
- U+00B7 · MIDDLE DOT
- U+003A : COLON
- U+2E31 ⸱ WORD SEPARATOR MIDDLE DOT
- U+1361 ፡ ETHIOPIC WORDSPACE
- U+10FB ჻ GEORGIAN PARAGRAPH SEPARATOR
- U+2056 ⁖ THREE DOT PUNCTUATION — linguist Nick Nicholas of Thesaurus Linguae Graecae remarks: "I am not familiar with U+2056 Three Dot Punctuation, which unlike the other multiple dot punctuations did not come from a TLG proposal; but even if a Greek had not come up with the idea of using three dots in a triangle as punctuation, no doubt someone else did".
- U+2058 ⁘ FOUR DOT PUNCTUATION
- U+2059 ⁙ FIVE DOT PUNCTUATION (according to researcher Nick Nicholas, this "also doubled as the pentonkion (a symbol for five ounces, which was also a 5 ounce silver coin)"
- U+205A ⁚ TWO DOT PUNCTUATION (According to Nick Nicholas, "often used to indicate the end of a sentence or a change of speaker, which is typographically distinguished in editions from the normal Roman colon by being made taller")
- U+205D ⁝ TRICOLON
- U+205E ⁞ VERTICAL FOUR DOTS
- U+2E19 ⸙ PALM BRANCH
- U+0830 ࠰ SAMARITAN PUNCTUATION NEQUDAA

In Linear B script:

- U+10100 𐄀 AEGEAN WORD SEPARATOR LINE
- U+10101 𐄁 AEGEAN WORD SEPARATOR DOT

== See also ==
- Sentence spacing – Horizontal space between sentences in typeset text
- Speech segmentation – Identification of constituent elements
- Substitute blank – Characters used to represent whitespace
- Underscore – Typographic symbol (underline)
- Whitespace – Computer text file character representing blank space
- Zero-width non-joiner – Non-printing character that separates two normally joined characters
- Zero-width space – Special character in text processing
