= Pentonkion =

A pentonkion was an ancient Greek coin worth five onkiae. Pentonkion is also the name for the characteristic symbol, ⁙, printed on such coins. This symbol was also used in Ancient Greek as punctuation, usually a word divider.

The situation is similar to the Roman coin quincunx, whose five indicatory dots, sometimes arranged into the ⁙ pattern, also led to that pattern being known as a quincunx.
