= Obelus =

Historical annotation mark or symbol

÷ † ⁒ ⸓o

Modern forms of the obelus
- In Unicode: U+00F7 ÷ DIVISION SIGN; U+2020 † DAGGER; U+2052 ⁒ COMMERCIAL MINUS SIGN; U+2E13 ⸓ DOTTED OBELOS

Different from
- Different from: U+0025 % PERCENT SIGN

Related
- See also: U+261E ☞ WHITE RIGHT POINTING INDEX

Three variants of obelus glyphs

An obelus (plural: obeluses or obeli) is a historical annotation mark in codicology that has come to have three distinct modern forms, meanings and typographical uses:

- Division sign ÷
- Dagger †
- Commercial minus sign ⁒ (limited geographical area of use)

The word "obelus" comes from ὀβελός (obelós), the Ancient Greek word for a sharpened stick, spit, or pointed pillar. This is the same root as that of the word 'obelisk'. In codicology, a (usually horizontal) obelus in the form of a dagger was used to indicate erroneous or dubious content. The third symbol is an obsolescent mark used in some European countries.

In mathematics, the ÷ symbol is mainly used in Anglophone countries to represent the mathematical operation of division (but has other meanings elsewhere) and is called an obelus in older textbooks. In modern typography, the second symbol, called a dagger mark † is used as a reference mark or footnote indicator. It also has other uses in a variety of specialist contexts.

== Use in text annotation ==
The modern dagger symbol originated from a variant of the obelus, originally depicted by a plain line −, or a line with one or two dots ⨪ ÷. It represented an iron roasting spit, a dart, or the sharp end of a javelin, symbolizing the skewering or cutting out of dubious matter.

Originally, one of these marks (or a plain line) was used in ancient manuscripts to mark passages that were suspected of being corrupted or spurious; the practice of adding such marginal notes became known as obelism. The dagger symbol †, also called an obelisk, is derived from the obelus, and continues to be used for this purpose.

The obelus is believed to have been invented by the Homeric scholar Zenodotus, as one of a system of editorial symbols. They marked questionable or corrupt words or passages in manuscripts of the Homeric epics. The system was further refined by his student Aristophanes of Byzantium, who first introduced the asterisk and used a symbol resembling a ⊤ for an obelus; and finally by Aristophanes' student, in turn, Aristarchus, from whom they earned the name of "Aristarchian symbols".

In some commercial and financial documents, especially in Germany and Scandinavia, a variant (U+2052 ⁒ COMMERCIAL MINUS SIGN) is used in the margins of letters to indicate an enclosure, where the upper point is sometimes replaced with the corresponding number. In Finland, the obelus (or a slight variant, $\cdot \! / \! \cdot$) is used as a symbol for a correct response (alongside the check mark, ✓, which is used for an incorrect response).

In the 7.0 release of Unicode, U+2E13 ⸓ DOTTED OBELOS was one of a group of "Ancient Greek textual symbols" that were added to the specification (in the block Supplemental Punctuation).

== In mathematics ==
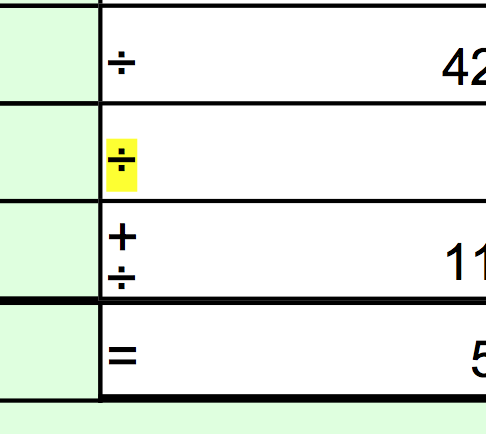
Plus and minuses. The obelus – or division sign – used as a variant of the minus sign in an excerpt from an official Norwegian trading statement form called «Næringsoppgave 1» for the taxation year 2010.

The form of the obelus as a horizontal line with a dot above and a dot below, ÷, was first used as a symbol for division by the Swiss mathematician Johann Rahn in his book Teutsche Algebra in 1659. This gave rise to the modern mathematical symbol ÷, used in anglophone countries as a division sign. This usage, though widespread in Anglophone countries, is neither universal nor recommended: the ISO 80000-2 standard for mathematical notation recommends only the solidus / or fraction bar for division, or the colon : for ratios; it says that ÷ "should not be used" for division. The ambiguity of mathematical expressions that involve the obelus and implicit multiplication has become a subject of Internet memes.

This form of the obelus was also occasionally used as a mathematical symbol for subtraction in Northern Europe; such usage continued in some parts of Europe (including Norway and, until fairly recently, Denmark). In Italy, Poland and Russia, this notation is sometimes used in engineering to denote a range of values (for example, "24.1÷25.6" means the range of values between 24.1 and 25.6).

In some commercial and financial documents, especially in Germany and Scandinavia, the symbol ÷ was used to signify a negative remainder of a division operation. (The Unicode Consortium has created a separate codepoint, U+2052 ⁒ COMMERCIAL MINUS SIGN, to represent that meaning. The representative glyph shown here is not significant: its precise form depends on the computer font used.)

== See also ==
- Manicule – Symbol depicting a pointing finger ( ☞ ) used for obelism.
- Obelisk – Tall, four-sided, narrow tapering monument which ends in a pyramid-like shape at the top
- Obelix – Cartoon character in the French comic book series Asterix
- Obol (coin) – Unit of ancient Greek coinage also known as an obelos.
- List of typographical symbols and punctuation marks
