= Diple (textual symbol) =

Symbol used in margins of Greek manuscripts to draw attention to something in text

Diple periestigmene (dotted diple) according to the variants in the "Proposal for the Universal Character Set" by Thesaurus Linguae Graecae, 2003

Diple (Ancient Greek: διπλῆ, meaning double, referring to the two lines in the mark >) was a mark used in the margins of ancient Greek manuscripts to draw attention to something in the text. It is sometimes also called antilambda because the sign resembles a Greek capital letter lambda (Λ) turned upon its side. In some ways its usage was similar to modern day quotation marks, which are derived from it.

Isidore of Seville remarks in his Etymologiae (I.21.13) that the diple was used to mark quotations from the Bible. He also talks about diple peri strichon (or sticon), which was used to draw attention to separate concepts, and diple periestigmene used (like obelos) to mark dubious passages. Diple obolismene was used according to Isidore to separate sentences in comedies and tragedies, so its usage was similar to that of paragraphos.

== See also ==
- Obelism – Editors' marks on manuscripts
- Coronis – Symbol found in ancient Greek papyri
- Greater-than quoting – Indicating a quotation using the sign >
- Usenet quoting – Conventions for text-based Internet fora
- Posting style – Conventions for text-based Internet fora
