= Hypodiastole =

Former Greek inter-word punctuation marker

Hypodiastole (left), in contrast to a comma (right)

The hypodiastole (Greek: ὑποδιαστολή, hypodiastolḗ, lit. 'lower separation [mark]'), also known as a diastole, was an interpunct developed in late Ancient and Byzantine Greek texts before the separation of words by spaces was common. In the scriptio continua then used, a group of letters might have separate meanings as a single word or as a pair of words. The papyrological hyphen (enotikon) showed a group of letters should be read together as a single word, and the hypodiastole showed that they should be taken separately. Compare ὅ⸒τι ('whatever') to ὅτι ('...that...').

The hypodiastole was similar in appearance to the comma and was eventually entirely conflated with it. In Modern Greek, ypodiastolī́ (υποδιαστολή) refers to the comma in its role as a decimal separator, and words such as ό,τι are written with standard commas. A separate Unicode point, ISO/IEC 10646 standard (U+2E12) (⸒), exists for the hypodiastole but is intended only to reproduce its historical occurrence in Greek texts.

== See also ==
- Interpunct
- Obelos
- Coronis
- Paragraphos
