= Tie (typography) =

Typographical symbol spanning letters)

◌͡◌o

Tie
- U+2040 ⁀ CHARACTER TIE

The tie is a symbol in the shape of an arc similar to a large breve, used in Central Alaskan Yupʼik, Greek, phonetic alphabets, and Z notation. It can be used between two characters with spacing as punctuation, non-spacing as a diacritic, or (underneath) as a proofreading mark. It can be above or below, and reversed. Its forms are called tie, double breve, enotikon or papyrological hyphen, ligature tie, and undertie.

== Uses ==
=== Cyrillic transliteration ===
In the ALA-LC romanization for Russian, a tie symbol is placed over some combinations of Latin letters that are represented by a single letter in the Cyrillic alphabet, e.g., T͡S for Ц and i͡a for Я. This is not uniformly applied, however; some letters corresponding to common digraphs in English, such as SH for Ш and KH for Х do not employ the tie. In practice, the tie ligature is often omitted.

=== Greek ===
The enotikon (ἑνωτικόν, henōtikón, lit. "uniter", from ἑνωτικός "a serving to unite or unify"), papyrological hyphen, or Greek hyphen was a low tie mark found in late Classical and Byzantine papyri. In an era when Greek texts were typically written scripta continua, the enotikon served to show that a series of letters should be read as a single word rather than misunderstood as two separate words. (Its companion mark was the hypodiastole, which showed that a series of letters should be understood as two separate words.) Although modern Greek now uses the Latin hyphen, the Hellenic Organization for Standardization included mention of the enotikon in its romanization standard and Unicode is able to reproduce the symbol with its characters U+203F ‿ UNDERTIE and U+035C ◌͜◌ COMBINING DOUBLE BREVE BELOW.

The enotikon was also used in Greek musical notation, as a slur under two notes. When a syllable was sung with three notes, this slur was used in combination with a double point and a diseme overline.

=== International Phonetic Alphabet ===
The International Phonetic Alphabet uses two types of ties: the ligature tie (IPA #433), above or below two symbols and the undertie (IPA #509) between two symbols.

==== Ligature tie ====
The ligature tie, also called double inverted breve, is used to represent double articulation (e.g. [k͡p]), affricates (e.g. [t͡ʃ]) or prenasalized consonants (e.g. [m͡b]) in the IPA. It is mostly found above but can also be found below when more suitable (e.g. [k͜p]).

On computers, it is encoded with characters U+0361 ◌͡◌ COMBINING DOUBLE INVERTED BREVE and, as an alternative when ascenders might be interfering with the bow, U+035C ◌͜◌ COMBINING DOUBLE BREVE BELOW.

==== Undertie ====
The undertie is used to represent linking (absence of a break) in the International Phonetic Alphabet. For example, it is used to indicate liaison (e.g. /vuz‿ave/) but can also be used for other types of sandhi.

On computers, the character used is U+203F ‿ UNDERTIE. This is a spacing character, not to be confused with the alternative (below-letter) form of the ligature tie (a͜b U+035C ◌͜◌ COMBINING DOUBLE BREVE BELOW), which is a combining character.

=== Uralic Phonetic Alphabet ===
The Uralic Phonetic Alphabet uses several forms of the tie or double breve:

- The triple inverted breve or triple breve below indicates a triphthong
- The double inverted breve, also known as the ligature tie, marks a diphthong
- The double inverted breve below indicates a syllable boundary between vowels
- The undertie is used for prosody
- The inverted undertie is used for prosody.

=== Vocal music scores ===
In musical score engraving, the undertie symbol is called an "elision slur" or "lyric slur", and is used to indicate synalepha: the elision of two or more spoken syllables into a single note; this is in contrast to the more common melisma, the extension of a single spoken syllable over multiple sung notes. Although rare in English texts, synalepha is often encountered in musical lyrics written in the Romance languages.

In use, the undertie is placed between the words of the lyric that are to be sung as one note to prevent the space between them being interpreted as a syllable break. For example, in the printed lyric "the‿im - mor - tal air", the undertie between "the" and "im-" instructs the singer to elide these two syllables into one, thus reducing five spoken syllables into four sung notes.

=== Other uses ===
Various forms of the tie

In proofreading, the undertie was used to indicate that word in a manuscript had been divided incorrectly by a space. (See Hyphen § Origin and history). The indicator used in modern practice is U+2050 ⁐ CLOSE UP.

In the field of computing, the Unicode character U+2040 ⁀ CHARACTER TIE is used to represent concatenation of sequences in Z notation. For example, "s⁀t" represents the concatenation sequence of sequences called s and t, while the notation "⁀/q" is the distributed concatenation of the sequence of sequences called q.

The double breve is used in the phonetic notation of the American Heritage Dictionary in combination with a double o, o͝o, to represent the near-close near-back rounded vowel (/ʊ/ in IPA).

The triple breve below is used in the phonetic writing Rheinische Dokumenta for three-letter combinations.

In the practical orthography of Central Alaskan Yup'ik, the tie is used in the digraphs ‹ u͡g, u͡r › and the trigraph ‹ u͡rr ›.

== Encoding ==
| name | character | HTML code | Unicode | Unicode name | sample |
non-spacing
| double breve | ◌͝◌ | &#861; | U+035D | combining double breve | o͝o |
| ligature tie | ◌͡◌ | &#865; | U+0361 | combining double inverted breve | /k͡p/ |
| ligature tie below, enotikon | ◌͜◌ | &#860; | U+035C | combining double breve below | /k͜p/ |
spacing
| undertie, enotikon | ‿ | &#8255; | U+203F | undertie | /vuz‿ave/ |
| tie | ⁀ | &#8256; | U+2040 | character tie | s⁀t |
| inverted undertie | ⁔ | &#8276; | U+2054 | inverted undertie | o⁔o |

The diacritic marks triple inverted breve, triple breve, and double inverted breve do not have explicit code-points in Unicode, but can be reproduced using combining half marks.

Unicode has characters similar to the tie:

- U+23DC ⏜ TOP PARENTHESIS and U+23DD ⏝ BOTTOM PARENTHESIS
- U+2322 ⌢ FROWN and U+2323 ⌣ SMILE
- U+2050 ⁐ CLOSE UP, which is a proofreading mark

== See also ==
- Typographic ligature – Glyph combining two or more letterforms
- Legato – Indicates that musical notes are played or sung smoothly and connected
- Breve – Bowl-shaped diacritic mark (◌̆)
- Inverted breve – Diacritical mark, ◌̑
- Underscore – Typographic symbol (underline)
