= Coronis (textual symbol) =

Symbol found in ancient Greek papyri

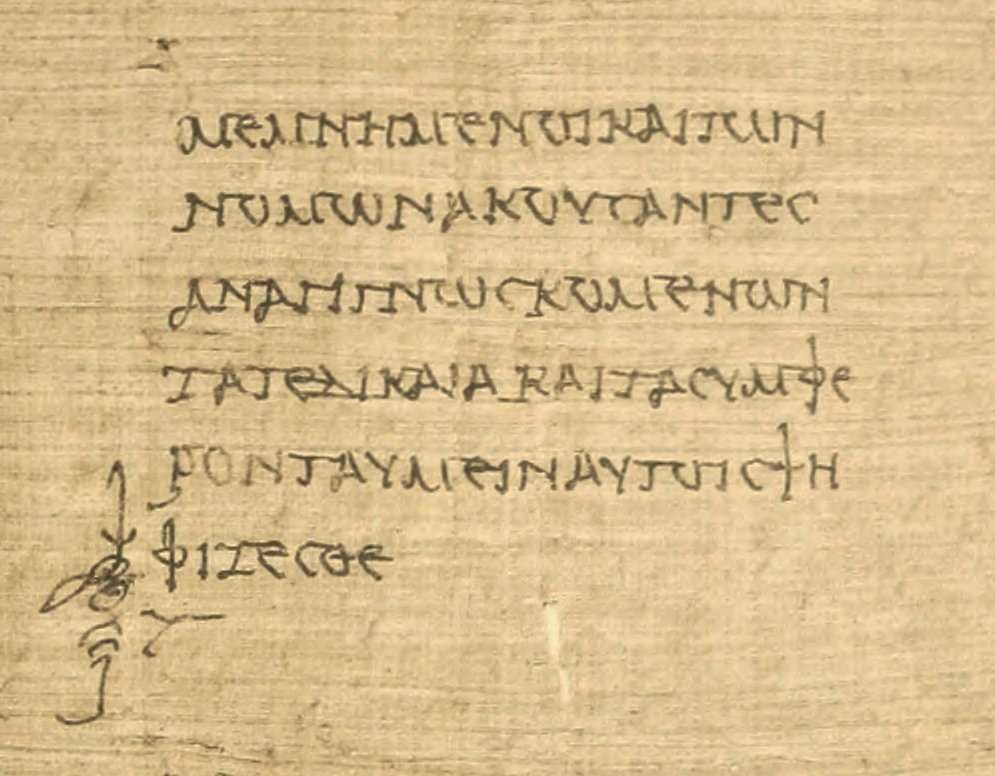
The final lines of Hypereides' In Philippidem with a coronis (in concert with a forked paragraphos) marking the end of the speech (P.Lit.Lond. 134 col. ix, 2nd century BCE).

A coronis ⸎ (Ancient Greek: κορωνίς, korōnís, pl. κορωνίδες, korōnídes) is a textual symbol found in ancient Greek papyri that was used to mark the end of an entire work or of a major section in poetic and prose texts. The coronis was generally placed in the left-hand margin of the text and was often accompanied by a paragraphos or a forked paragraphos (diple obelismene).

The coronis is encoded by Unicode as part of the Supplemental Punctuation block, at U+2E0E ⸎ EDITORIAL CORONIS.

== Etymology ==
Liddell and Scott's Greek–English Lexicon gives the basic meaning of korōnis as "crook-beaked" from which a general meaning of "curved" is supposed to have derived. Pierre Chantraine concurs and derives the word from κορώνη (korōnē), "crow", assigning the meaning of the epithet's use in reference to the textual symbol to the same semantic range of "curve". But, given the fact that the earliest coronides actually take the form of birds, there has been debate about whether the name of the textual symbol initially referred to use of a decorative bird to mark a major division in a text or if these pictures were a secondary development that played upon the etymological relation between korōnē, "crow", and korōnis, as in "curved".

== Examples ==
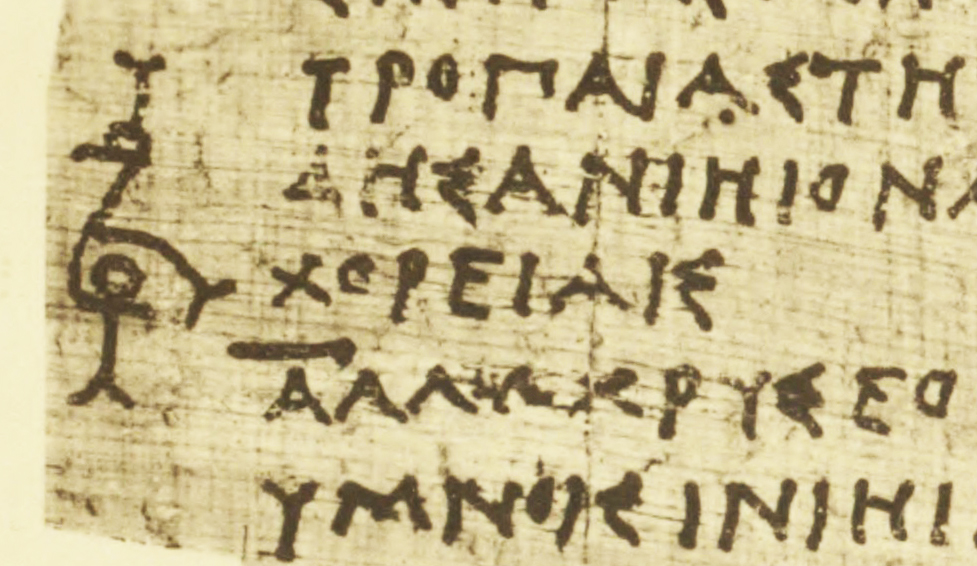
Detail of P.Berol. inv. 9875 col. v (late fourth or early third century BCE), showing the bird-shaped coronis at the beginning of the "sphragis" in the Persae of Timotheus of Miletus.

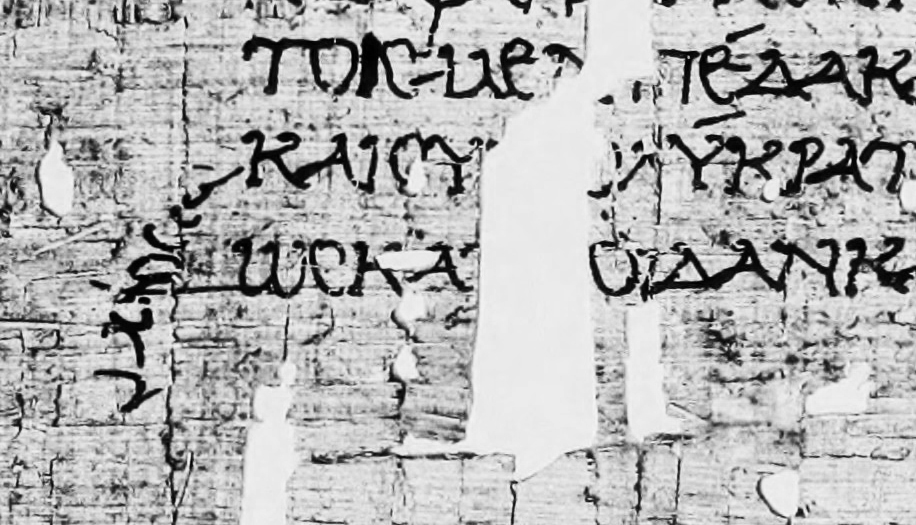
Detail of P.Oxy. XV 1790 fr. 2 + 3 col. ii (late second–early first century BCE): the coronis marks the end of a poem (and probably the end of a book of poetry) by Ibycus.

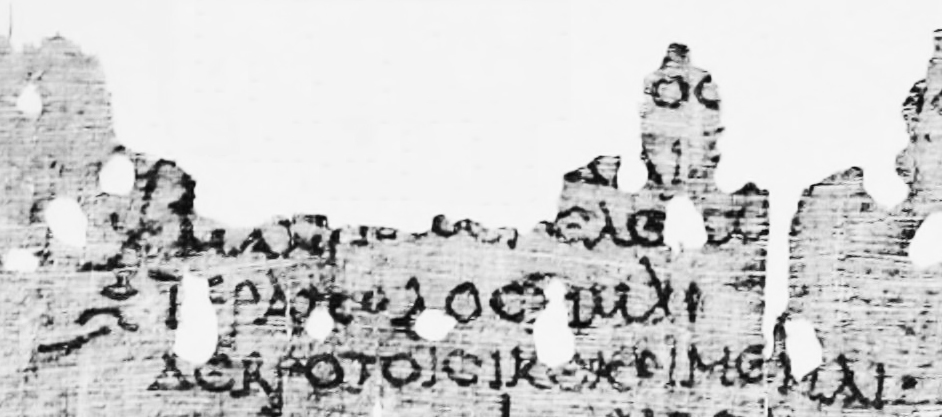
Detail of P.Oxy. IV 659 col. i (late first century BCE or early first century CE): Pindar, Partheneia with a coronis marking the end of a strophe.

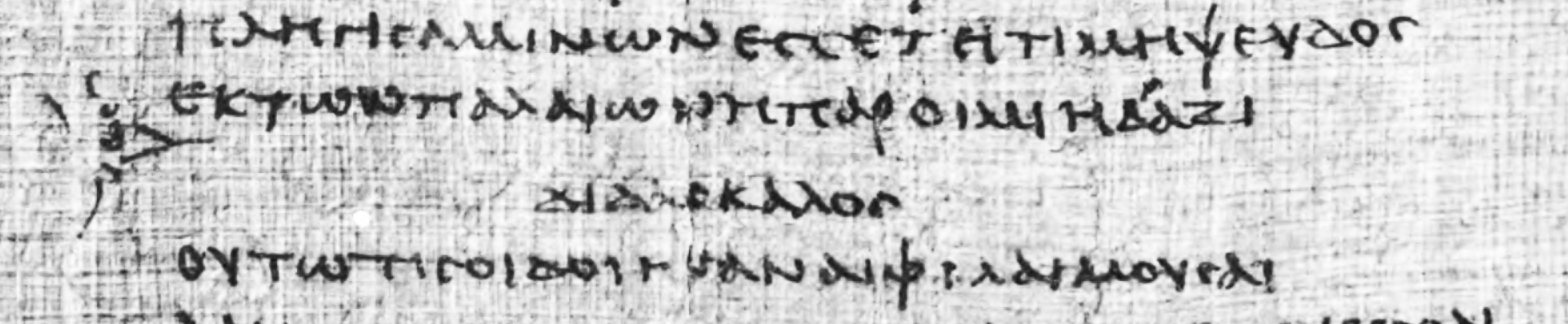
Detail of P.Lit.Lond. 96 col. xiii (late first–early second century CE): a coronis (with a forked paragraphos) marking the end of Herodas, Mimiamb 2 followed by the title and beginning of Mimiamb 3.

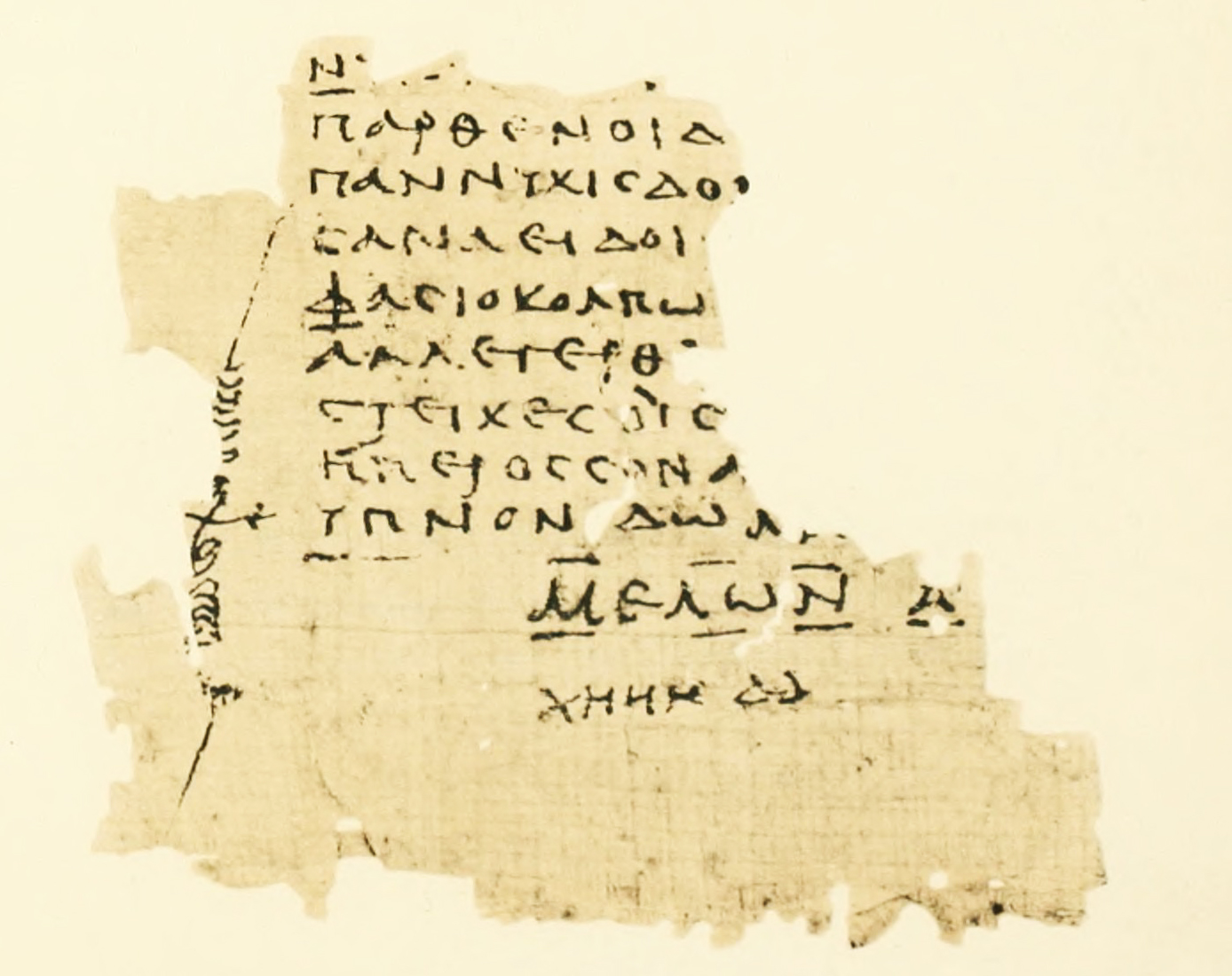
P.Oxy. X 1231 fr. 56 (second century CE), showing a coronis, end-title and verse count at the close of Sappho book one.

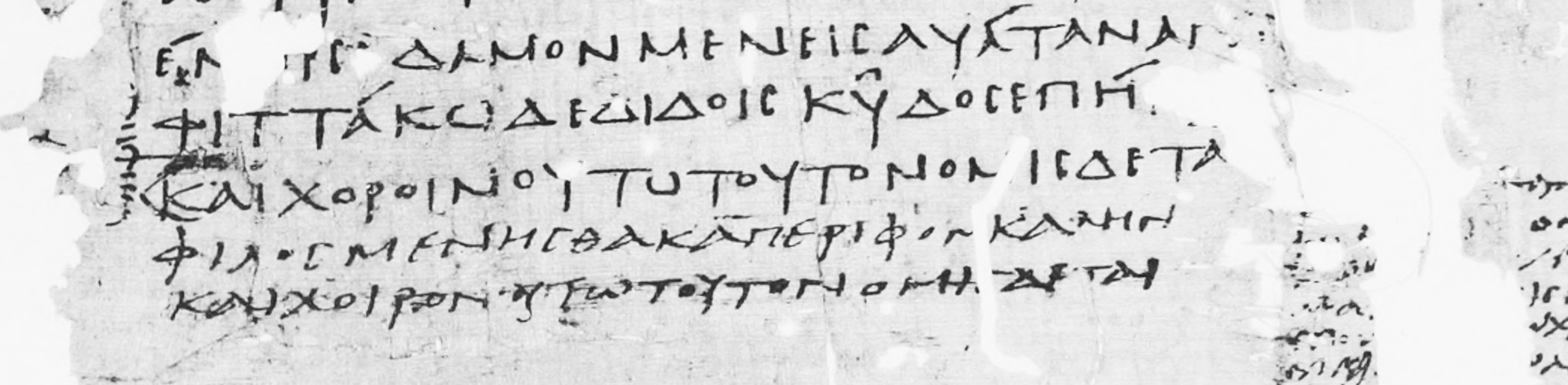
Detail of P.Oxy. X 1234 fr. 2 col. i (second century CE), with the coronis used to mark the end of a poem by Alcaeus.

== See also ==
- Obelism
