= Paragraphos =

Ancient Greek paragraph markers

Various paragraphoi

A paragraphos (Ancient Greek: παράγραφος, parágraphos, from para-, 'beside', and graphein, 'to write') was a mark in ancient Greek punctuation, marking a division in a text (as between speakers in a dialogue or drama). The earliest Classical Greek and Roman texts were written in all capital letters with minimal spacing; punctuation was sparse and not standardized. The paragraphos was also used to mark a change in topic in prose. It was sometimes added to completed texts as a form of obelism alongside other marginalia, including the obelus.

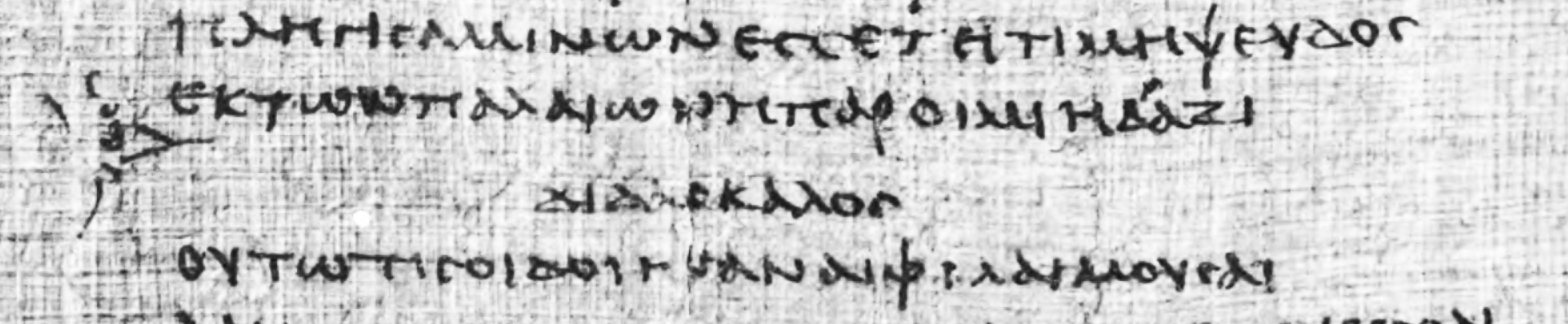
Early 2nd-century papyrus with a coronis (⸎) and a forked paragraphos marking the end of Herodas, Mimiamb 2, followed by the title and beginning of Mimiamb 3

There are many variants of this symbol, sometimes supposed to have been developed from Greek gamma (Γ), the first letter of the word graphos. It was usually placed at the beginning of a line and trailing a little way under or over the text. Two modern elements of writing derive their name and purpose from the paragraphos: the paragraph and the pilcrow. The paragraph, a section of prose typically dealing with the same topic, evolved from the use of the paragraphos, and its name comes from the French form of the term, paragraphe. The paragraphos symbol was moved from beside the block of text into it, and its form changed from a simple line to a K for kaput (Latin for head), to a C for capitulum (Latin for little head), to a stylized C sometimes referred to as a capitulum (⸿), and finally into the pilcrow (¶), also known as the paragraph mark. Ultimately the pilcrow was dropped, and paragraphs were indicated by spacing.

Aristotle commented on the paragraphos and was dismissive of its use. In Aristotle's Rhetoric, he argues that the end of section should be so clear from the language that it would not need to be marked.

Unicode encodes multiple versions:

- U+2E0F ⸏ PARAGRAPHOS
- U+2E10 ⸐ FORKED PARAGRAPHOS
- U+2E11 ⸑ REVERSED FORKED PARAGRAPHOS
- U+205A ⁚ TWO DOT PUNCTUATION

== See also ==
- Obelus and Obelism, Greek marginal notes
- Coronis, the Greek paragraph mark
- Pilcrow (¶), the English paragraph mark
- Section sign (§), the English section mark
