= Subsection =

Subsection may refer to:

- Subsection (botany), a taxonomic rank for plants, below section and above species
- Subsection (typography), a section within a section of a document
- Subsection (zoology), a taxonomic rank for animals, below section and above family
