= Iran System encoding =

Programming character encoding

Iran System encoding is an 8-bit character encoding scheme and was created by Iran System corporation for Persian language support. This encoding was in use in Iran in DOS-based programs. After the introduction of Microsoft code page 1256, this encoding became obsolete. However, some Windows and DOS programs using this encoding are still in use and some Windows fonts with this encoding exist. Now most programs use code page 1256 or Unicode.

== Character set ==
Only the upper half (characters 0x80–0xFF) of this extended ASCII table differs from code page 437, the lower half (0x00–0x7F) being the same. This character set encodes distinct visual forms separately.

IRAN SYSTEM
	0	1	2	3	4	5	6	7	8	9	A	B	C	D	E	F
0x	NUL	☺	☻	♥	♦	♣	♠	•	◘	○	◙	♂	♀	♪	♫	☼
1x	►	◄	↕	‼	¶	§	▬	↨	↑	↓	→	←	∟	↔	▲	▼
2x	SP	!	"	#	$	%	&	'	(	)	*	+	,	-	.	/
3x	0	1	2	3	4	5	6	7	8	9	:	;	<	=	>	?
4x	@	A	B	C	D	E	F	G	H	I	J	K	L	M	N	O
5x	P	Q	R	S	T	U	V	W	X	Y	Z	[	\	]		_
6x	`	a	b	c	d	e	f	g	h	i	j	k	l	m	n	o
7x	p	q	r	s	t	u	v	w	x	y	z	{	|	}	~	⌂
8x	۰	۱	۲	۳	۴	۵	۶	۷	۸	۹	،	ـ	؟	ﺁ	ﺋ†	ﺀ
9x	ﺍ	ﺎ	ﺏ‡	ﺑ†	ﭖ‡	ﭘ†	ﺕ‡	ﺗ†	ﺙ‡	ﺛ†	ﺝ‡	ﺟ†	ﭺ‡	ﭼ†	ﺡ‡	ﺣ†
Ax	ﺥ‡	ﺧ†	ﺩ‡	ﺫ‡	ﺭ‡	ﺯ‡	ﮊ‡	ﺱ‡	ﺳ†	ﺵ‡	ﺷ†	ﺹ‡	ﺻ†	ﺽ‡	ﺿ†	ﻁ*
Bx	░	▒	▓	│	┤	╡	╢	╖	╕	╣	║	╗	╝	╜	╛	┐
Cx	└	┴	┬	├	─	┼	╞	╟	╚	╔	╩	╦	╠	═	╬	╧
Dx	╨	╤	╥	╙	╘	╒	╓	╫	╪	┘	┌	█	▄	▌	▐	▀
Ex	ﻅ*	ﻉ	ﻊ	ﻌ	ﻋ	ﻍ	ﻎ	ﻐ	ﻏ	ﻑ‡	ﻓ†	ﻕ‡	ﻗ†	ﮎ‡	ﮐ†	ﮒ‡
Fx	ﮔ†	ﻝ‡	ﻻ	ﻟ†	ﻡ‡	ﻣ†	ﻥ‡	ﻧ†	ﻭ‡	ﻩ‡	ﻬ	ﻫ	ﯽ	ﯼ	ﯾ†	NBSP

† Initial or medial form.
‡ Final or isolated form.
