= Therefore sign =

Mathematical logical symbol of 3 dots

∴o

Therefore sign
- In Unicode: U+2234 ∴ THEREFORE (&there4;, &Therefore;, &therefore;)

Different from
- Different from: U+2235 ∵ BECAUSE

Related
- See also: Similar signs (below)

In logical argument and mathematical proof, the therefore sign, ∴, is generally used before a logical consequence, such as the conclusion of a syllogism. The symbol consists of three dots placed in an upright triangle and is read therefore. While it is not generally used in formal writing, it is used in mathematics and shorthand.

== History ==
According to Florian Cajori in A History of Mathematical Notations, the Swiss mathematician Johann Rahn used both an upright and an inverted triangle of dots to mean therefore. In the German edition of Teutsche Algebra (1659), he used the upright triangle with its modern meaning, but in the 1668 English edition Rahn used the inverted triangle more often to mean 'therefore'. Other authors in the 18th century also used three dots in a triangle shape to signify 'therefore', but as with Rahn, there was little consistency as to how the triangle was oriented. Use of an upright triangle exclusively to mean therefore (and an inverted triangle exclusively to mean because) appears to have originated in the 19th century. In the 20th century, the three-dot notation for 'therefore' became very rare in continental Europe, but it remains popular in Anglophone countries.

== Examples of use ==
Used in a syllogism:

All gods are immortal.
Zeus is a god.
∴ Zeus is immortal.

and in mathematics:

x + 1 = 10
∴ x = 9

== Other uses ==
=== Meteorology ===
In meteorology, a sign of three dots similar to the therefore sign is used to indicate "moderate rain" on a station model; the similar typographic symbol asterism (⁂, three asterisks) indicates moderate snow.

=== Freemasonry ===
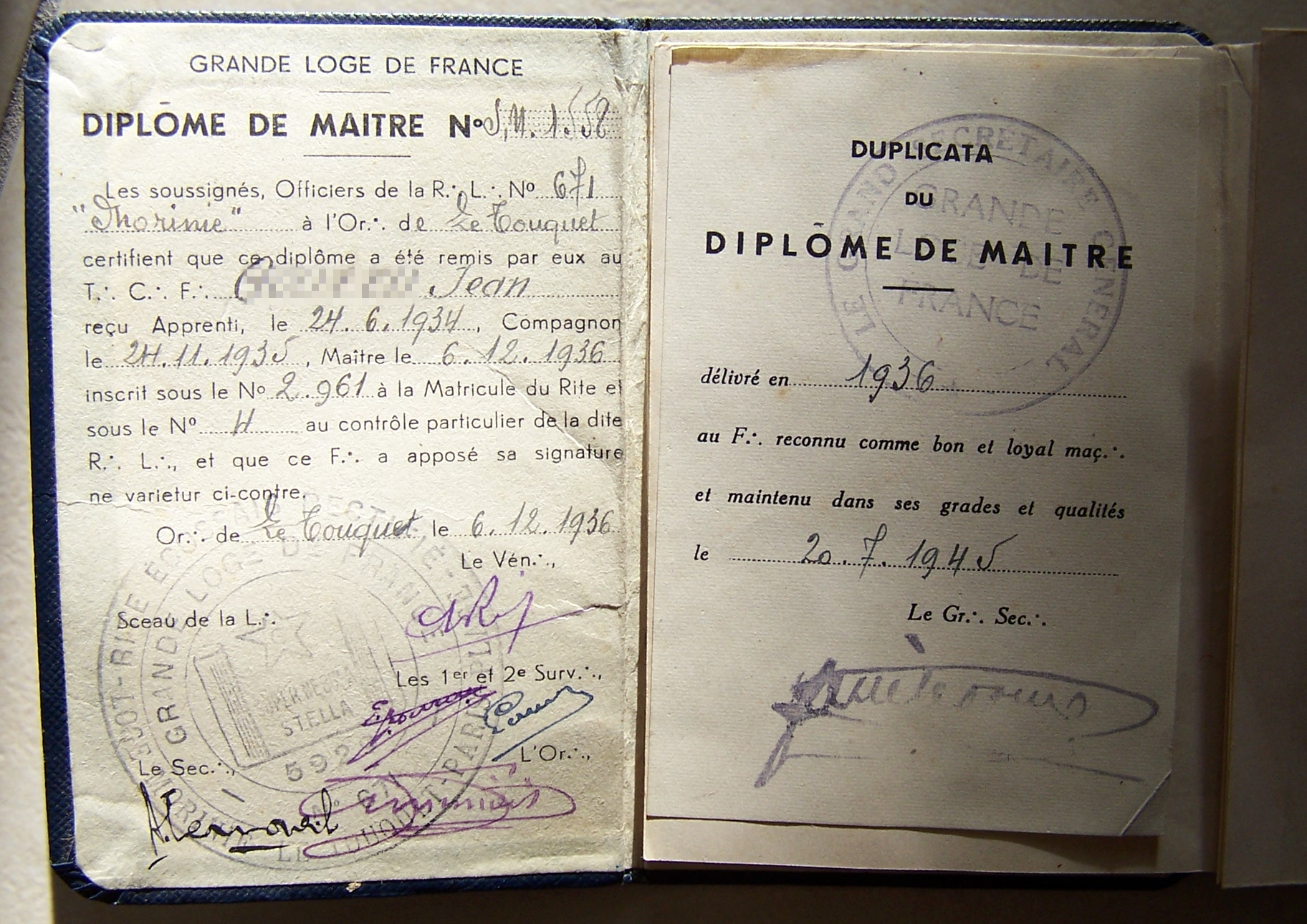
A diploma from the Masonic Grande Loge de France showing the symbol as a substitute for the dot of abbreviation

In Freemasonry and certain related traditions, the symbol is used to indicate a Masonic abbreviation (rather than the period mark used conventionally with some abbreviations). For example, "R∴W∴ John Smith" is an abbreviation for "Right Worshipful John Smith" (the term Right Worshipful is an honorific and indicates that Smith is a Grand Lodge officer).

=== Anarchism ===
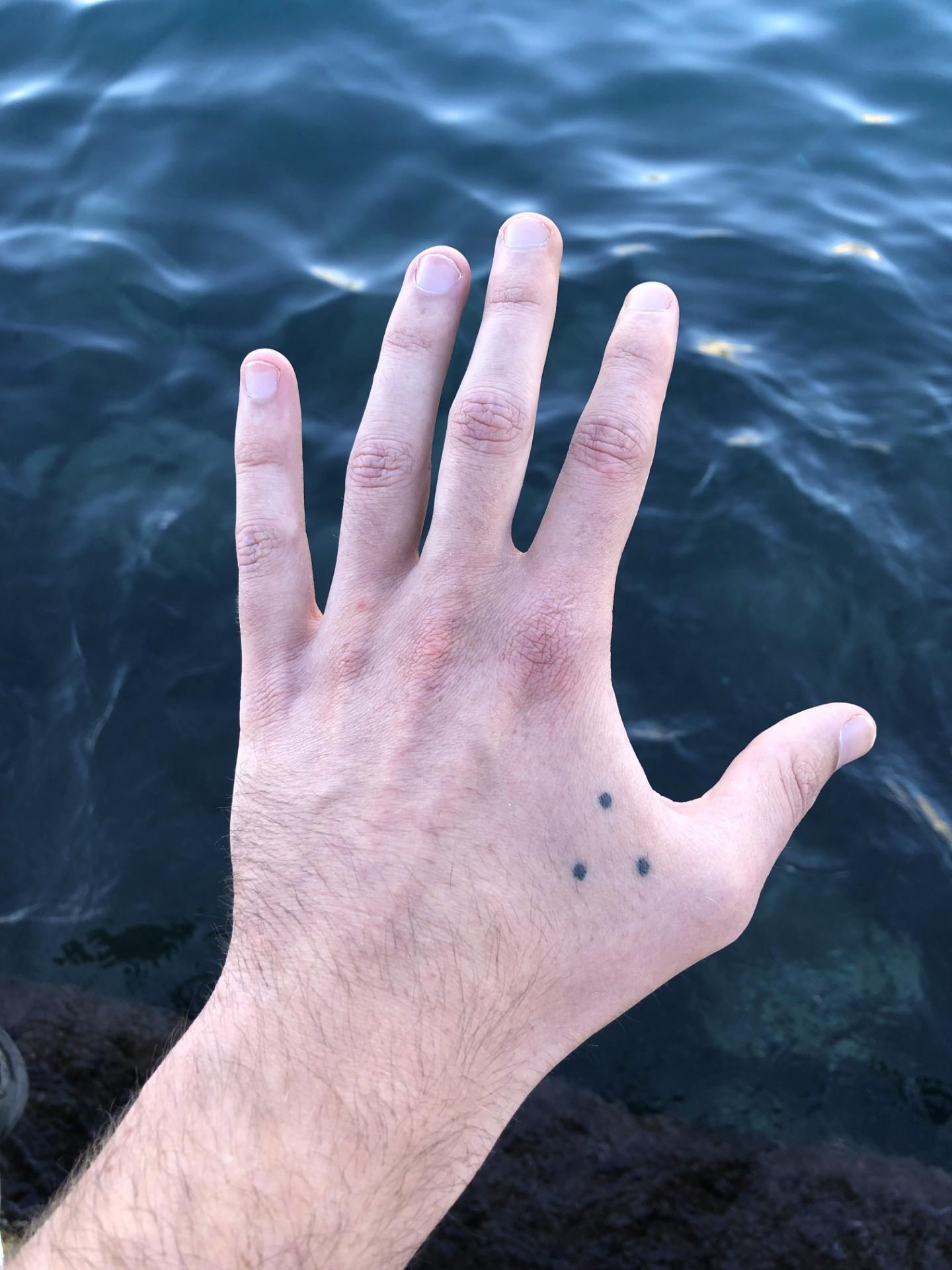
"Mort aux vaches" tatoo on a left hand.

Originating from 19th French Anarchism, the three dot symbol is used as an anti-military and anti-authority signal, representing the French phrase "Mort aux vaches !", which is equivalent to "Death to pigs" in English, although the original translates directly as "Death to Cows". It is frequently tattooed on the first metacarpal space.

== Unicode ==
The symbol has a Unicode code point at U+2234 ∴ THEREFORE (&there4;, &Therefore;, &therefore;). See Unicode input for keyboard-entering methods.

== LaTeX ==
One can write the symbol in LaTeX by using the amssymb package with the \therefore command.

== Similar signs ==
∵ ஃ ⁂ ⛬ ߷o

Similar signs
- In Unicode: U+2235 ∵ BECAUSE (&becaus;, &Because;, &because;); U+0B83 ஃ TAMIL SIGN VISARGA; U+2042 ⁂ ASTERISM; U+26EC ⛬ HISTORIC SITE; U+07F7 ߷ NKO SYMBOL GBAKURUNEN

The inverted form, ∵, known as the because sign, is sometimes used as a shorthand form of "because".

The character ஃ (visarga) in the Tamil script represents the āytam, a special sound of the Tamil language.

An asterism, ⁂, is a typographic symbol consisting of three asterisks (*) placed in a triangle. Its purpose is to "indicate minor breaks in text", to call attention to a passage, or to separate sub-chapters in a book.

A similar sign serves as a Japanese map symbol on the maps of the Geographical Survey Institute of Japan, indicating a tea plantation. On some maps, a version of the sign with thicker dots, ⛬, is used to signal the presence of a national monument, historic site or ruins; it has its own Unicode code point.

In Norwegian and Danish, a superficially similar symbol was formerly used as an explanatory symbol (forklaringstegnet). It can be typeset using the open o followed by a colon, thus: ɔ:. It is used for the meaning "namely", id est (i.e.), videlicet (viz.) or similar.

The punctuation mark ߷ (gbakurunen) of the N'Ko script—a modern writing system for the Manding languages of West Africa—is a paragraph mark which marks the end of a major section of text. Its function is similar to that of the asterism. It symbolizes three stones holding a cooking pot over a fire. It is also used by internet users to pictorially represent a fidget spinner.

== See also ==
- Q.E.D.
- List of mathematical jargon
- Three dots (disambiguation)
