= Asterism =

Asterism(s) may refer to:

- Asterism (astronomy), a pattern of stars
  - Constellation, an area of the sky named after a traditional pattern of stars
- Asterism (band), a Japanese rock band
- Asterism (gemology), an optical phenomenon in gemstones
- Asterism (typography), (⁂) a moderately rare typographical symbol denoting a break in passages
- Asterisms (album), a 2024 album by Sean Lennon

== See also ==
- Constellation (disambiguation)
