= ISO 2145 =

Standard for numbering divisions in text

International standard ISO 2145 defines a typographic convention for the "numbering of divisions and subdivisions in written documents". It applies to any kind of document, including manuscripts, books, journal articles, and standards.

== Description ==
The ISO 2145 numbering scheme is defined by the following rules:

- Only Arabic numerals (1, 2, 3, …) are used.
- The main divisions are numbered continuously starting from 1.
- Each main division (first level) can be divided further into subdivisions (second level), which are equally continuously numbered. This can be continued for further levels of subdivision.
- A full stop is placed between numbers that designate subdivisions of different levels. No full stop is placed after the number that designates the final subdivision.
- A number 0 (zero) can be assigned to the first division of each level if it forms an introduction, preface, foreword, or the like.

== Example ==
A table of contents might look like:

0	Foreword
1	Introduction
2	Methodology
2.1	Counting techniques
2.1.1	Manual procedures
2.1.1.1	Counting apples
2.1.1.2	Counting oranges
2.1.2	Automatic methods
2.2	Quality control
3	Results
4	Related work
4.1	Bean counting
4.2	Sheep counting
5	Conclusions

== Citations ==
Division and subdivision numbers are cited in written text as in:

- … in chapter 4 …
- … as lemma 3.4.27 shows …
- … the 3rd paragraph in 2.4.1.7 …

In spoken language, the full stops are omitted:

- "… in chapter four …"
- "… as lemma three four twenty-seven shows …"
- "… the third paragraph in two four one seven …"

== Support in word processing software ==
- All standard LaTeX document classes generate chapter, section, subsection, figure, table, etc. numbers as defined by ISO 2145.
- As of 2003, all Microsoft Word versions were by default set up to add a full stop after the final section number. This does not conform to ISO 2145. However, users can change style settings to match the ISO standard. In Word 16, for example, in the “Styles pane”, right-clicking on the relevant heading style to select “Modify Style”, then following Format/Numbering.../Outline Numbered leads to a graphical choice of numbering styles that includes one closely matching ISO 2145, which can then be customized to remove any trailing dot.

== See also ==
- Decimal section numbering
- Decimal separator
- Dot-decimal notation
