= Implementation Rule =

Chinese regulations

The Implementation Rules are regulations of the People’s Republic of China, which set the framework of the valid product standards. For each product group there is a specific implementation rule, which is set by the Chinese authorities.

== Content of the Implementation Rules ==
The Implementation Rules include 12 or 13 chapters, which determine the scope of the product certification. The following table provides an overview of the most common contents of the Implementation Rules:

1. Scope
2. Terms and definitions
3. Standards for certification
4. Certification pattern
5. Individual product units
6. Certification commission
7. Certification procedure
8. Certificates
9. Approval procedure
10. Certification logo
11. Fees
12. Responsibilities
13. Certification rules

== Update of the Implementation Rules ==
In 2014, the Implementation Rules have been updated, so that from 2015 some changes have come into effect. For example, some product groups, which were previously grouped under one Implementation Rule, are now divided and subject to some different Implementation Rules. Furthermore, new products have been added, which are now subject to the mandatory certification. Further factory levels were introduced, so that the companies that carry out a product certification will be assigned a level (A-D) in future. Companies that receive particularly positive results on their products certification will receive level A.

== See also ==
- Standardization
- Certification
