= Constellation (disambiguation) =

A constellation is formally any of certain areas of the celestial sphere; or popularly and traditionally, a perceived pattern of stars.

Constellation or constellations may also refer to:

== Aerospace ==
- Constellation Airlines, a defunct Belgian charter airline
- Lockheed Constellation, a propeller-driven airliner
- Constellation program, a canceled NASA human space exploration program
- Satellite constellation, a group of satellites

== Arts, entertainment, and media ==
=== Music ===
==== Albums and EPs ====
- Constellation (Alabama Thunderpussy album), 2000
- Constellation (EP), an Extended Play by black metal band Arcturus, 1994
- Constellation (Jim Cuddy album), 2018
- Constellation (Sonny Stitt album), 1972
- Constellations, a 2010 album by Balmorhea
- Constellations (August Burns Red album), 2009
- Constellations (Dave Douglas album), 1995
- Constellations (Esprit D'Air album), 2017

==== Songs ====
- "Constellations" (song), the 2009 debut single by indie rock band Darwin Deez
- "Constellations", a song by Duster from the album Stratosphere

==== Other uses in music ====
- "Constellation" (composition), a 1948 contrafact of "I Got Rhythm" by Charlie Parker
- Constellation Records (disambiguation), the name of three different record labels
- The Constellations, an American hip hop/rock band

=== Science fiction ===
- Con†Stellation, an annual general-interest science fiction convention held in Huntsville, Alabama
- ConStellation, the 41st World Science Fiction Convention, held in Baltimore in 1983
- Constellation (TV series), a 2024 science fiction TV series
- Constellations (2005 book), a 2005 science fiction anthology
- Constellations: Stories of the Future, a 1980 science fiction anthology

=== Other uses in arts, entertainment, and media ===
- Constellation (Fabergé egg), one of two Easter eggs made under the supervision of Peter Carl Fabergé in 1917
- Constellation (film), a 2007 film set in Huntsville, Alabama
- Constellation (sculpture), a sculpture by Santiago Calatrava
- Constellation (sculpture series), a 2000 series of outdoor bronze sculptures by Tad Savinar
- Constellation Theatre Company, Washington, D.C., US
- "Constellations", a Series C episode of the television series QI (2005)
- Constellations (Miró), a 1939 artwork series by Joan Miró
- Constellation (nightclub), a performing arts venue in Chicago, Illinois
- Constellations (play), a 2012 play premiered at the Royal Court Theatre
- Constellations (writers' festival), a one-off festival in Adelaide in 2026
- Sozvezdie (film festival), a Russian film festival that translates to "Constellation"

== Business and industry ==
- Constellation Brands, a major wine, beer and spirits company
- Constellation (energy company), a power generation company
- EURion constellation, an anti-counterfeiting scheme
- Sozvezdie, a Russian electronic warfare company, meaning "Constellation"

== Science and technology ==
- Prime constellation, a pattern of prime numbers
- Constellation diagram, a means of representing a modulation scheme in digital communications
- Sun Constellation System, a petascale computing environment from Sun Microsystems

== Transport ==
- Volkswagen Constellation, a truck

=== Ships ===
- GTS Celebrity Constellation, a Celebrity Cruises ship
- USS Constellation, a series of U.S. Navy ships, and several fictional ships
- C/S Salamis Glory, a cruise ship, formerly named Constellation
- Constellation (yacht), 12-metre class yacht

==== Ship classes ====
- Constellation-class frigate, a U.S. Navy frigate class based on the FREMM international frigate design
- Constellation-class battlecruiser, an interwar U.S. Navy battlecruiser class cancelled due to the Washington Naval Treaty
- Constellation-class container ship, a container ship class used by COSCO

=== Fictional vehicles ===
- Constellation-class starship, a fictional class of spacecraft in Star Trek from the United Federation of Planets' 24th-century Starfleet

== Other ==
- Constellations (journal), a peer-reviewed sociology journal
- Family Constellations
- Le Constellation, a bar in Crans-Montana, Valais, Switzerland where a fire happened in 2026
