= Bullet (typography) =

Typographical symbol (•)

•o

Bullet
- In Unicode: U+2022 • BULLET (&bull;, &bullet;)

Different from
- Different from: U+00B7 · MIDDLE DOT; U+2219 ∙ BULLET OPERATOR

Related
- See also: other bullet characters

In typography, a bullet is a typographical mark placed before an item in a list. The common round form, •, is encoded in Unicode as U+2022 • BULLET (&bull;, &bullet;). Other glyphs and graphics can also be used as list markers. A list set with these marks is called a bulleted list. An individual entry is often called a bullet point.

== Use and styling ==
Bullets may take the form of solid or open circles, squares, triangles, dingbats, or other graphics.

Bulleted lists can contain nested levels. Nested items are usually indented, and typesetting or word-processing software may assign a different bullet form to each level.

Punctuation and capitalization depend on house style. Short fragments may be left without terminal punctuation, while complete sentences may end with periods. A list item that completes an introductory sentence may also take a period.

== History ==
The English word bullet comes from Middle French boulette, meaning a small ball, and boulet, meaning a missile. Both derive from boule, meaning ball.

Marks that direct readers toward particular passages predate the modern bullet. The manicule, a pointing-hand mark such as ☛, was written in manuscript margins and was later used in print. It was common in manuscript annotation before the spread of printing and remained in use in early printed books.

A 1950 New York News Type Book used "bullet" for the typographic device and placed bullets in a category called "Accessories", alongside asterisks and check marks. The book did not assign bullets a distinct list function.

== Modern use: bullet points ==
The compound noun "bullet point" is attested from 1983 in a book review published in Datamation.

Example:

Bullets are often used in technical writing, reference works, notes, and presentations.

This statement may be presented using bullets or other techniques:

Bullets are often used in:
- Technical writing
- Reference works
- Notes
- Presentations

Alternatives to bulleted lists are numbered lists and outlines (lettered lists, hierarchical lists). They are used either where the order is important or to label the items for later referencing.

== Computing ==
=== Historical systems ===
In the original IBM Personal Computer character set, some byte values assigned in ASCII for control codes were displayed visible glyphs. Decimal values 7 through 10 displayed •, ◘, ○ and ◙. The corresponding Unicode code points U+0007 through U+000A are BELL, BACKSPACE, CHARACTER TABULATION and LINE FEED.

Plain-text markup often uses ordinary ASCII characters in place of a literal bullet. CommonMark, a specification for Markdown, accepts *, - and + as bullet-list markers. The earlier Setext markup language used an asterisk followed by a space to mark a bulleted item.

=== Unicode ===
U+2022 • BULLET is in the General Punctuation block and has the descriptive alias "black small circle". Other Unicode characters have names or annotations that designate them as bullet forms.

Bullet-related Unicode characters
| Character | Code point | Unicode name |
|---|---|---|
| • | U+2022 | BULLET |
| ‣ | U+2023 | TRIANGULAR BULLET |
| ⁃ | U+2043 | HYPHEN BULLET |
| ⁌ | U+204C | BLACK LEFTWARDS BULLET |
| ⁍ | U+204D | BLACK RIGHTWARDS BULLET |
| ◘ | U+25D8 | INVERSE BULLET |
| ◦ | U+25E6 | WHITE BULLET |
| ☙ | U+2619 | REVERSED ROTATED FLORAL HEART BULLET |
| ❥ | U+2765 | ROTATED HEAVY BLACK HEART BULLET |
| ❧ | U+2767 | ROTATED FLORAL HEART BULLET |
| ⦾ | U+29BE | CIRCLED WHITE BULLET |
| ⦿ | U+29BF | CIRCLED BULLET |
| ◉ | U+25C9 | FISHEYE, also used in Japan as a bullet and called tainome |

The visually similar ∙ is U+2219 ∙ BULLET OPERATOR, a separate character in the Mathematical Operators block. U+2022 • BULLET is part of General Punctuation. In the Unicode mapping for Windows code page 437, byte F9_{16} maps to U+2219.

=== Web pages ===
In HTML, an unordered list uses the <ul> element, with each entry placed in an <li> element. Web browsers normally display unordered-list items with disc-shaped markers, though CSS can change their appearance. CSS can use another predefined marker, a character, a counter or an image.

The U+2022 character can be written in HTML as &bull; or &bullet;, or with a numeric character reference. These references produce a bullet glyph but do not make the surrounding text a list. HTML list elements give browsers and assistive technologies information about the relationship among the items.

A bulleted list does not assign numbers to its entries. In HTML, the <ul> element is used for a list in which changing the order of the items would not materially change the meaning. The <ol> element is used when the order is intentional. Individual entries use the <li> element.

=== LaTeX ===
In LaTeX, the itemize environment creates a bulleted list. Each \item command begins a new entry.

=== Wiki markup ===
In MediaWiki markup, an unordered-list item begins with an asterisk. More leading asterisks create nested levels.

=== Other uses in computing ===
WordPress navigation menus generated by wp_nav_menu() use an HTML <ul> element by default. A site's CSS can keep, change or remove the list marker.

In Microsoft Word, typing an asterisk followed by a space can begin a bulleted list automatically. The bullet symbol, size and formatting can then be changed through the list controls.

== Other uses ==
Bullets are also used to redact characters entered into password fields, a technique known as password masking. For example, password may be displayed as ••••••••.

== See also ==
- Dinkus
- End mark
- Fleuron (typography)
- Unicode input for methods to enter characters not on the user's default keyboard setting,
