= Dinkus =

Typographic device ( * * * ) to indicate a change

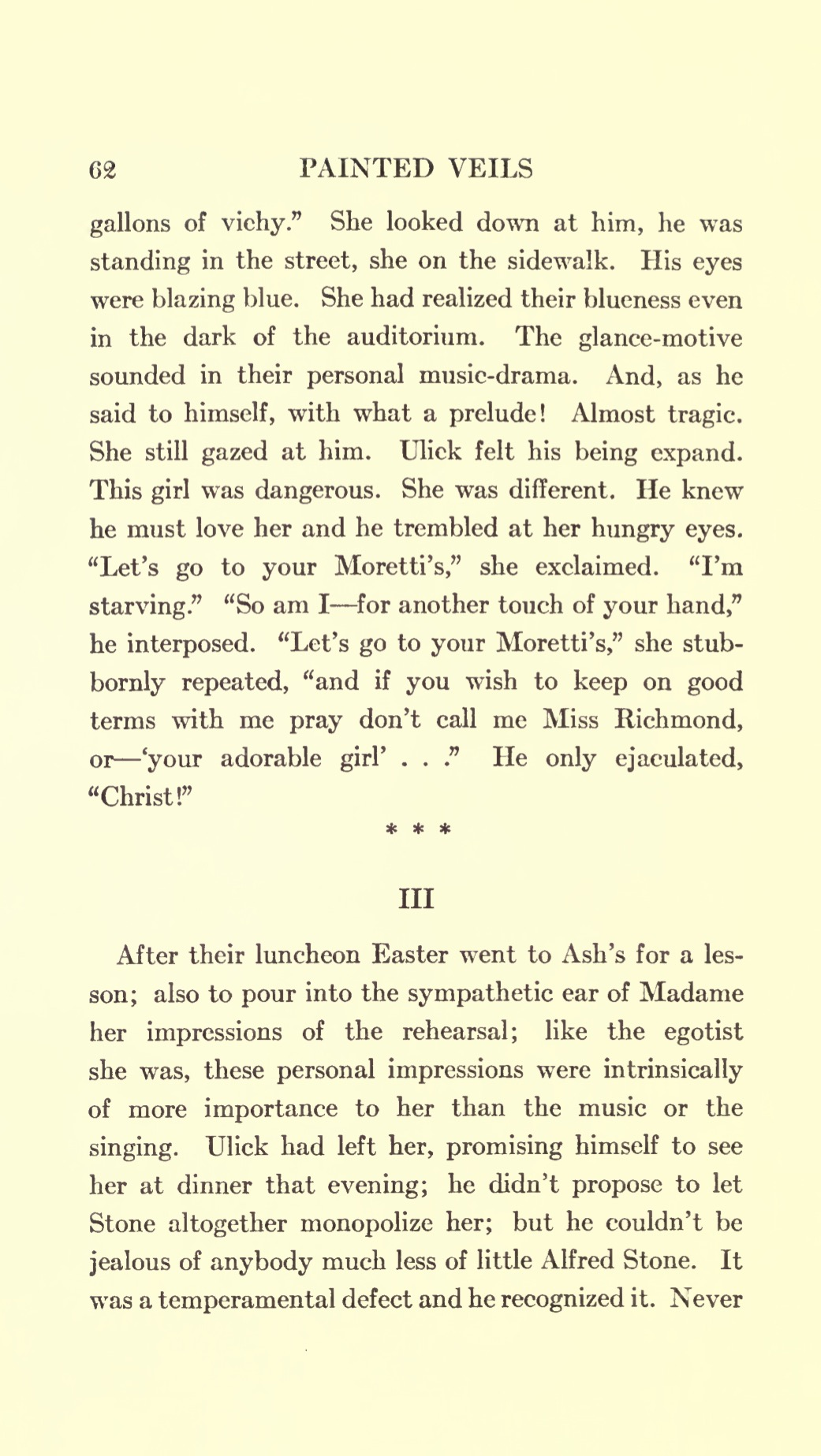
Three asterisks as a dinkus in the James Huneker novel Painted Veils.

In typography, a dinkus is a typographic device or convention that typically consists of three spaced asterisks or bullet symbols in a horizontal row, e.g. ∗ ∗ ∗ or • • • . The device has a variety of uses, and it usually denotes an intentional omission or a logical "break" of varying degree in a written work. This latter use is similar to a subsection, and it indicates that the subsequent text should be re-contextualized. Such a dinkus typically appears centrally aligned on a line of its own with vertical spacing before and after the device. The dinkus has been in use in various forms since c. 1850. Historically, the dinkus was often represented as an asterism, ⁂, though this has fallen out of favor and is now nearly obsolete.

== Etymology ==
The Macquarie Dictionary attributes the word's origin to the 1870's American slang word dingus, which refers to something that has a forgotten or unknown name.

== Usage ==
The dinkus is used for various purposes, but many of them are related to an intentional break in the flow of the text.

=== Subsection break ===
A dinkus can be used to accentuate a break between subsections of a single section. A dinkus dividing a larger section is intended is to maintain a sense of continuity within the overall chapter or section while changing elements of the setting or timeline. For instance, to introduce a flashback or other scene change, a dinkus can help denote the change within the overall theme of the chapter; in that case, it can be preferable to the initiation of a new chapter. This technique is used especially in literary fiction.

=== Intentionally omitted information ===
Many applications of the dinkus, including those that were common historically, have indicated intentional omission of information. Such a dinkus informs the reader that the information has been omitted. It can also mean "untitled" or that the author or title was withheld. This is evident, for example, in some editions of Album for the Young by composer Robert Schumann (№ 21, 26, and 30).

A dinkus can also be used in any context as a simple means of abbreviation of any text. The dinkus is used specifically in this capacity within the sphere of lawmaking, particularly for city ordinances. When used in legal text, the dinkus indicates an abbreviation within amendments to code while not implying the repeal of the omitted sections.

=== Ornamentation ===
Newspapers, magazines, and other works can use dinkuses as simple ornamentation, for solely aesthetic reasons. A primarily aesthetic dinkus often takes the form of a fleuron, e.g., ❧ or a dingbat.

=== Poetic symbolism ===
In some cases, a dinkus has been employed in poetry to convey non-verbal meaning. This is exemplified in the poem Thresholes by Lara Mimosa Montes, which frequently uses a circular dinkus, ○ , as a form of "punctuation at the level of the full text, rather than the phrase or the sentence".

== Variations ==
Many dinkuses are composed partially or entirely of asterisks. Other symbols include a series of dots, fleurons, asterisms, or small drawings. Esperanto Braille punctuation commonly uses a series of colons, ⠒⠒⠒, as a dinkus.

=== Gallery ===
Dinkuses in literary works
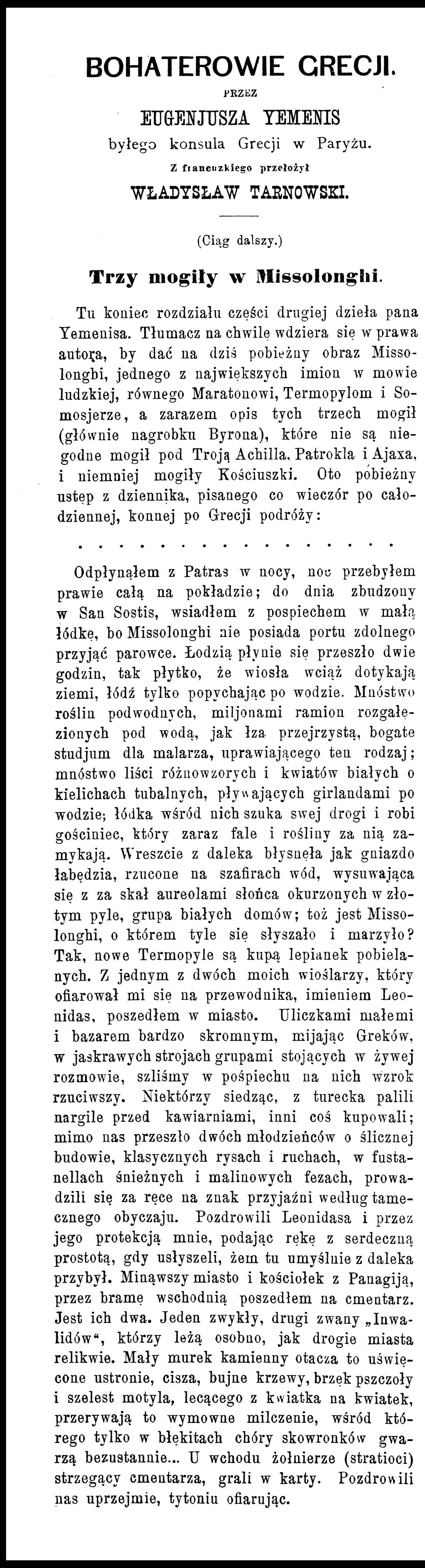
A Polish translation of a French work using a series of dots as a dinkus. The dinkus separates the translator's notes from the text.

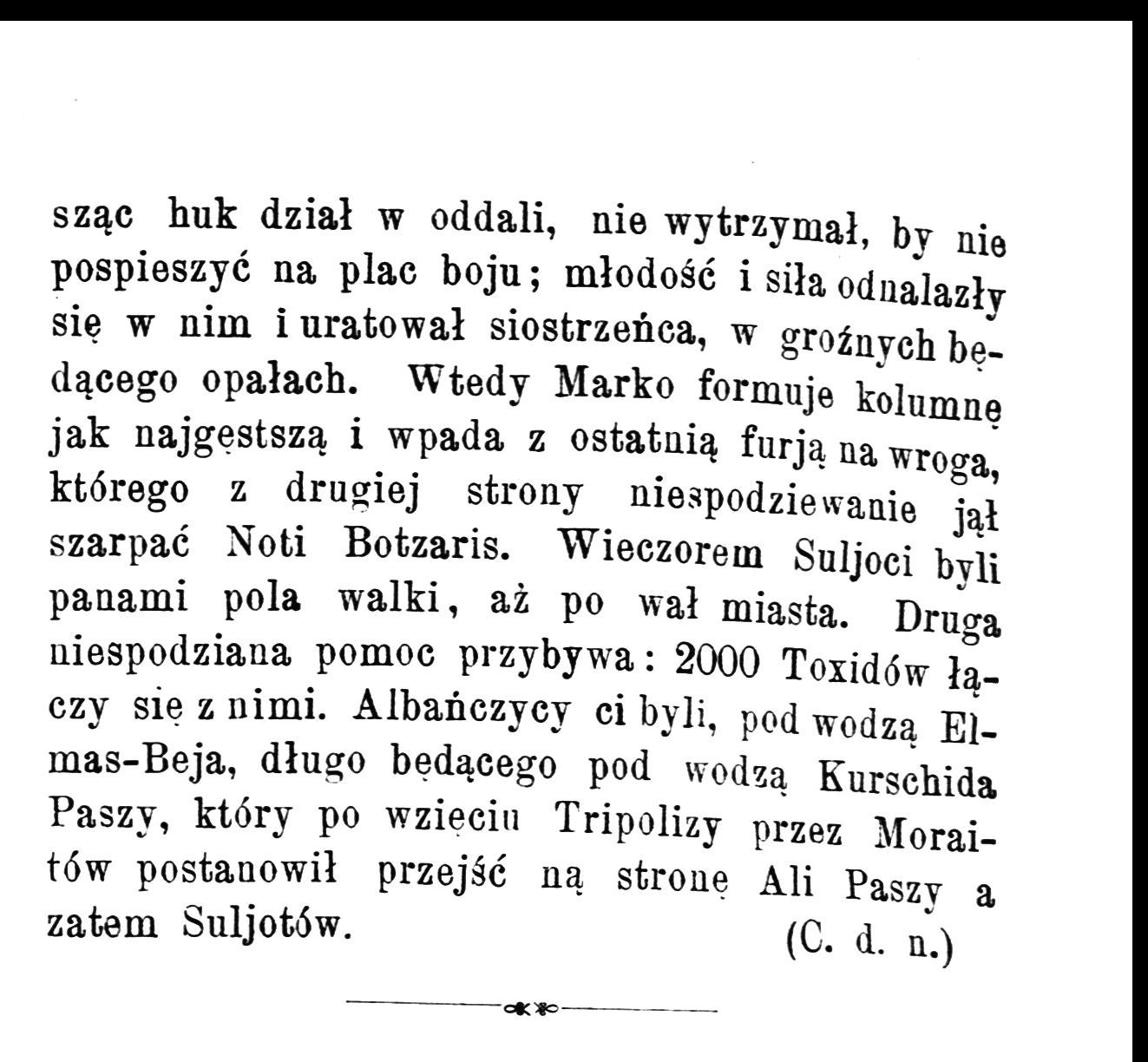
A combination of a fleuron and line-shaped dinkus in the same Polish work

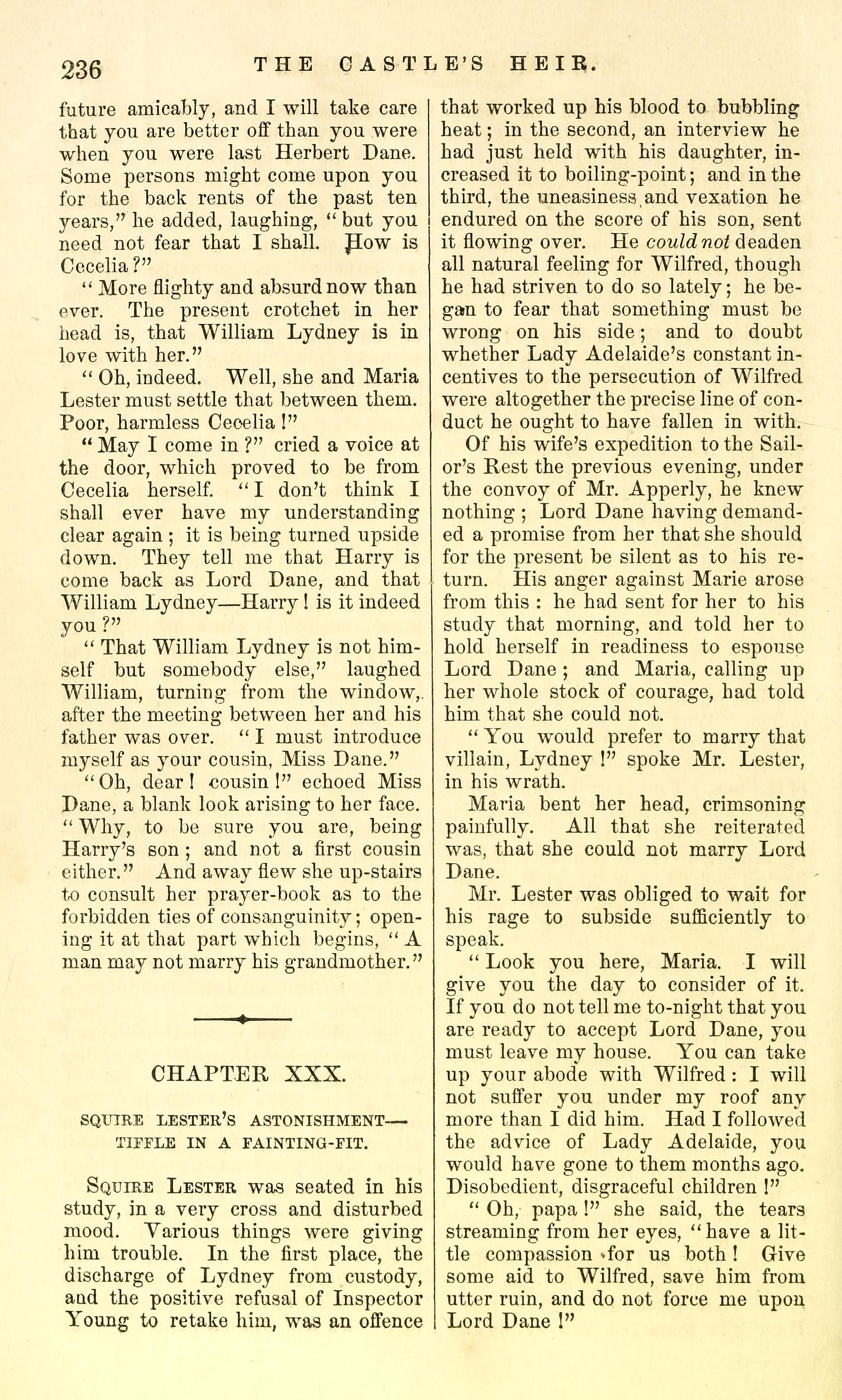
Mrs. Henry Wood's 19th-century novel exemplifying a line-shaped dinkus with a central diamond as a chapter break

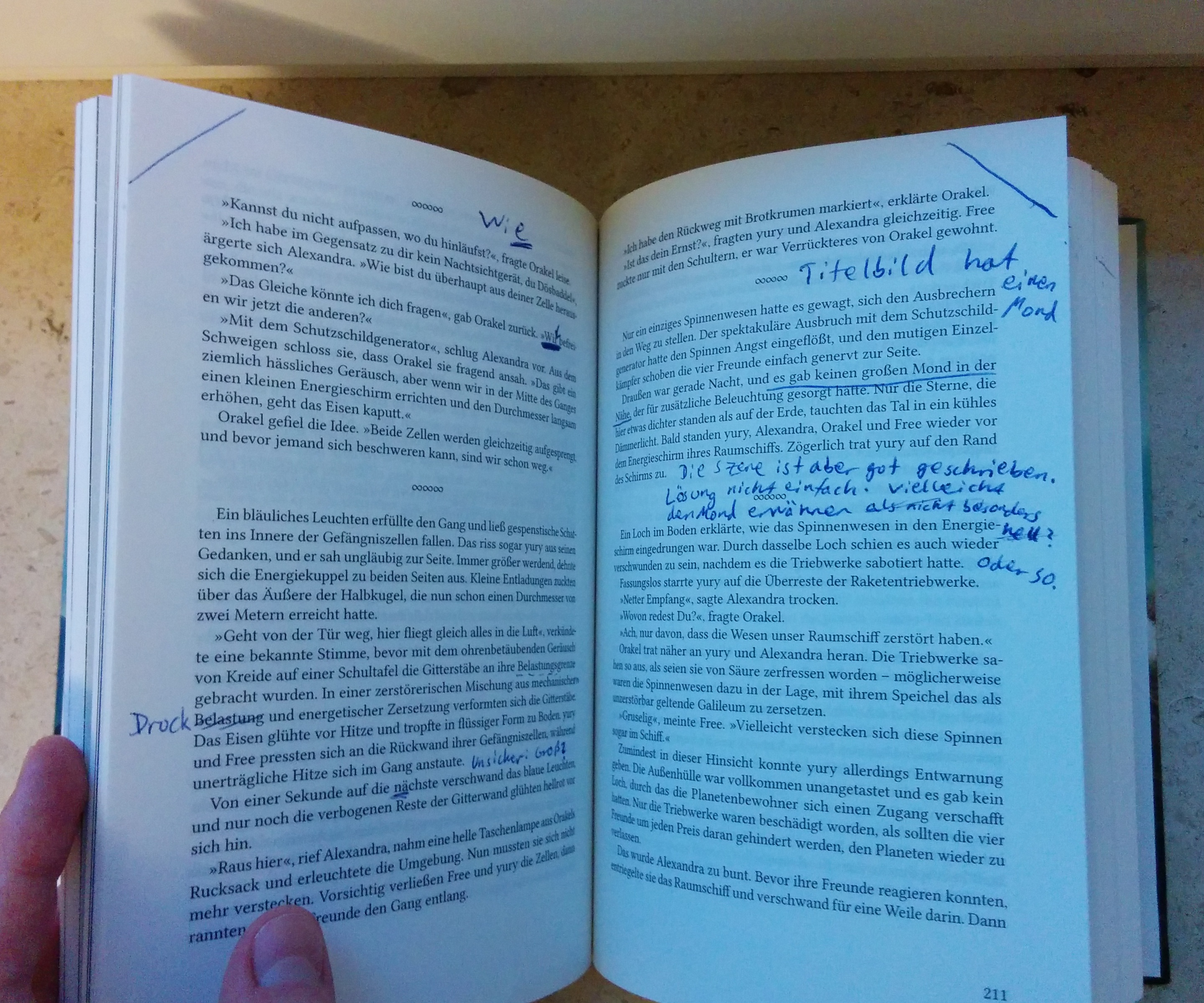
A German novel, Infinite Adventures, with an infinity symbol in triplicate as a dinkus

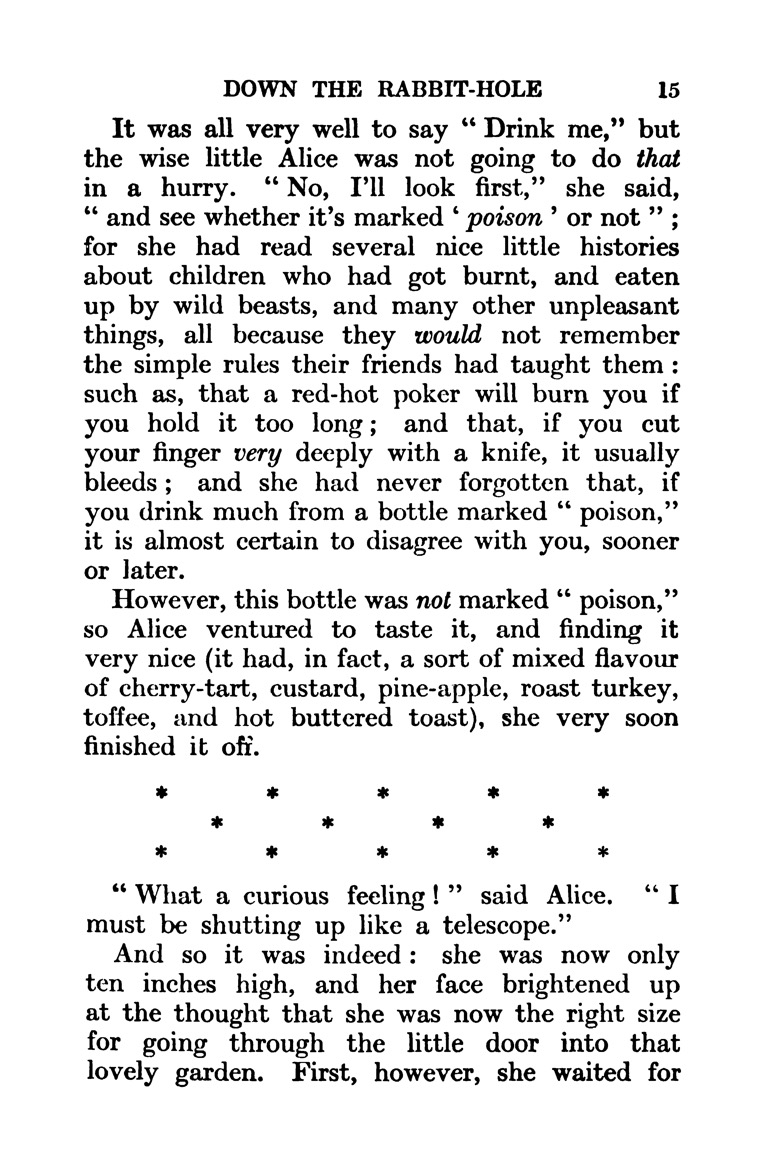
Lewis Carroll's Alice in Wonderland, in a print of indeterminate age, features dinkuses of asterisks forming a field of stars.

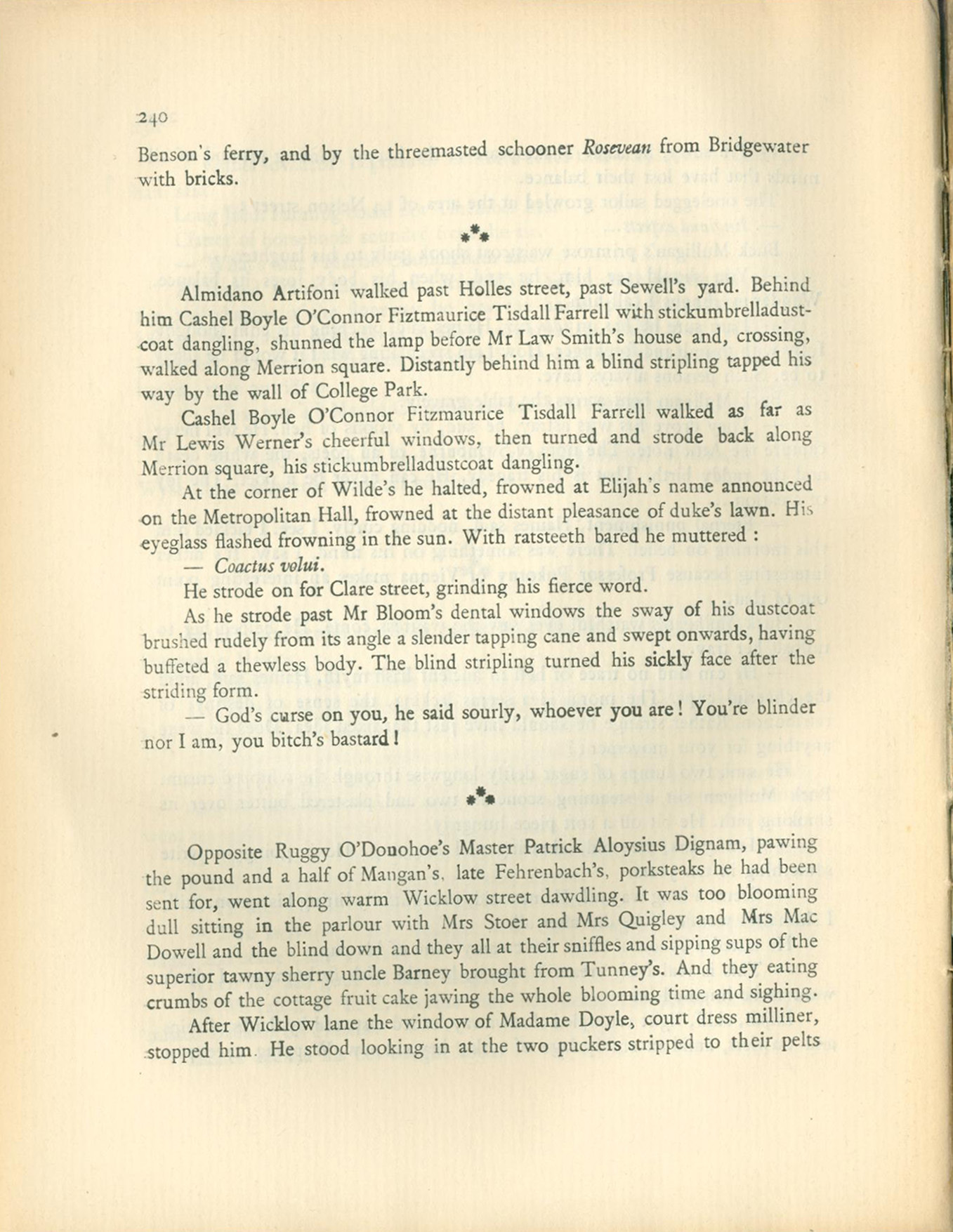
Ulysses by James Joyce uses an asterism as a dinkus in earlier prints, while newer editions replace it with three horizontal asterisks.

== Other uses of the term "dinkus" ==
Among older Hungarian Americans and Polish Americans, dinkus (or dyngus) is an archaic term for Easter Monday.

In Australian English, particularly in the news media, the word "dinkus" refers to a small photograph of the author of a news article. Outside Australia, this is often referred to as a headshot.
