= Reference mark =

Typographical mark (※)

※o

Reference mark
- In Unicode: U+203B ※ REFERENCE MARK (komejirushi, chamgopyo)

Different from
- Different from: U+205C ⁜ DOTTED CROSS; U+070D ܍ SYRIAC HARKLEAN ASTERISCUS; U+1360 ፠ ETHIOPIC SECTION MARK

Related
- See also: U+002A * ASTERISK; U+2020 † DAGGER

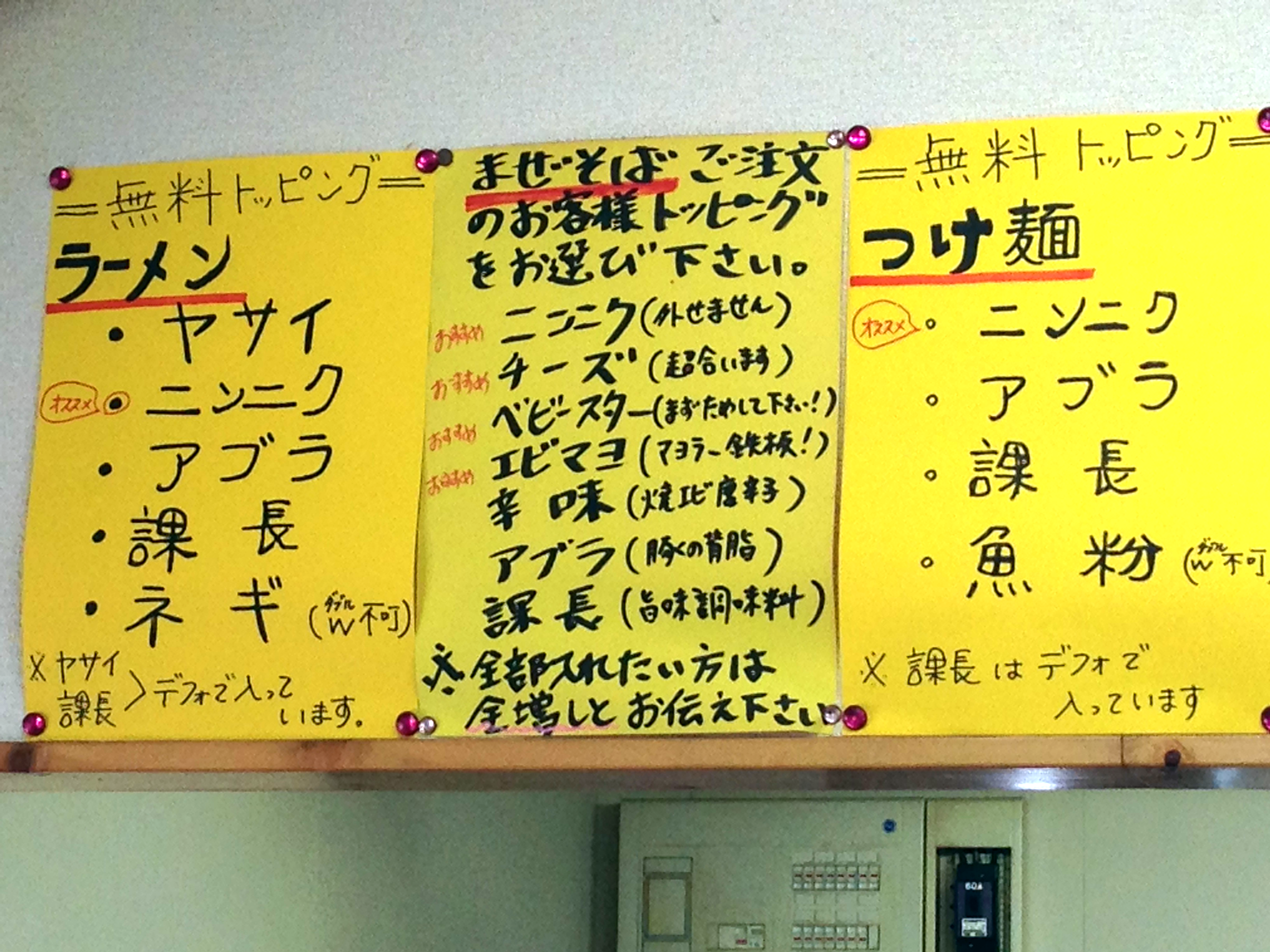
Handwritten notice in Japanese. Note the komejirushi at the bottom of each page, preceding the footnotes.

The reference mark or reference symbol "※" is a typographic mark or word used in Chinese, Japanese and Korean (CJK) writing.

The symbol was used historically to call attention to an important sentence or idea, such as a prologue or footnote. As an indicator of a note, the mark serves the same purpose as the asterisk in English. However, in Japanese usage, the note text is placed directly into the main text immediately after the reference mark, rather than at the bottom of the page or end of chapter as is the case in English writing.

== Names ==
In Chinese, the symbol is called cānkǎo biāojì (Chinese: 参考标记; lit. 'reference mark') or mǐ xīnghào (Chinese: 米星号; lit. 'rice asterisk' due to its visual similarity to 米 "rice"). It is not often used in Chinese writing.

The Japanese name, komejirushi (Japanese: こめじるし; 米印, pronounced [komedʑiꜜɾɯɕi], lit. 'rice symbol'), also refers to the symbol's visual similarity to the kanji for "rice" (米).

In Korean, the symbol's name, chamgopyo (Korean: 참고표; 參考標), simply means "reference mark". Informally, the symbol is often called danggujangpyo (당구장표; 撞球場標; lit. 'billiard hall mark'), as it is often used to indicate the presence of pool halls, due to its visual similarity to two crossed cue sticks and four billiard balls.

== Unicode ==
In Unicode, the symbol has the code point U+203B ※ REFERENCE MARK.

== See also ==
- Syncword – "Preamble" to communications message data after a header, also called reference signal or midamble in wireless communications.
- Dagger (mark) – Typographical symbol (†)
- Nota bene – Latin phrase meaning "note well"
