= SinaSoft Corporation =

Former Iranian software company

- Industry: Computer software
- Founded: 1985; 41 years ago
- Headquarters: Tehran, Iran
- Area served: Iran
- Products: Garce; Kelk; Nasher; Paradox; Payvand; Payvazh; Pishkar; Sayeh; Zarnegar
- Website: sinasoft.com

SinaSoft Corporation (شرکت نرم‌افزاری سینا) is an Iranian software company founded in 1985.

SinaSoft has been inactive since early 2000s, and most of the software development and support has been transferred to Sina Cultural and Software Foundation.
