= USS Constellation =

USS Constellation is a shipname.

== U.S. Navy ==
It may refer to the following ships of the United States Navy:

- USS Constellation (1797), was a 38-gun frigate launched in 1797 and scrapped in 1853
- USS Constellation (1854), is a sloop-of-war launched in 1854 and decommissioned in 1933, and preserved as a National Historic Landmark in Baltimore, Maryland
- USS Constellation (CC-2), was a battlecruiser laid down in 1920 and had construction cancelled in 1923
- USS Constellation (CV-64), was a Kitty Hawk-class aircraft carrier which served from 1961 to 2003
- USS Constellation (FFG-62), will be the lead ship of her class of guided missile frigates

== In fiction ==
- USS Constellation (NCC-1017), is a fictional spaceship found in Star Trek, which played a starring role in the 1967 TV episode The Doomsday Machine

== See also ==
- Constellation (disambiguation)
