= Constellation (sculpture) =

Sculpture by Santiago Calatrava in Chicago, Illinois, U.S.

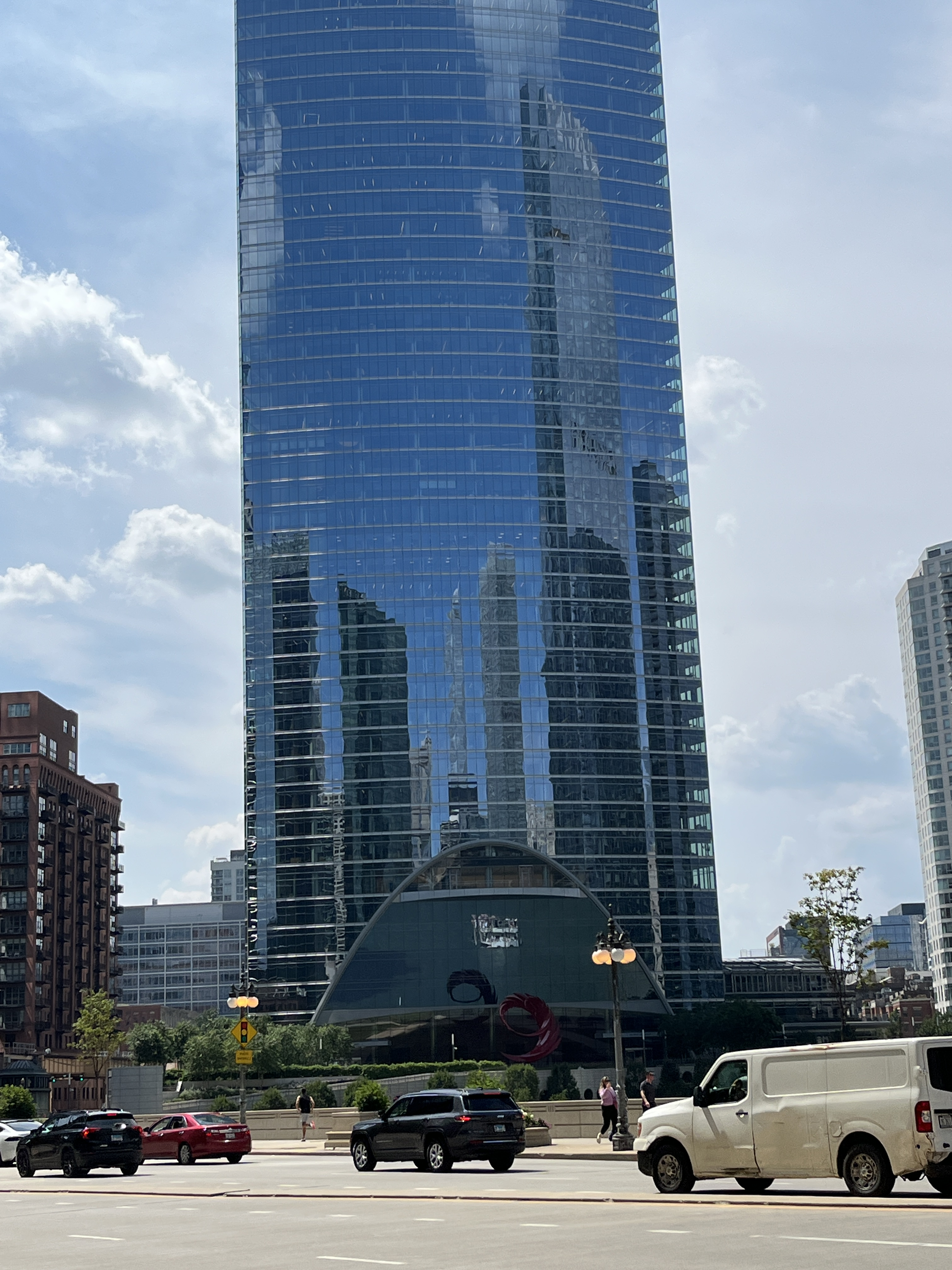
- Sculpture at the building's base, 2023
- Artist: Santiago Calatrava
- Location: Chicago, Illinois, U.S.
- 41°53′10.6″N 87°38′20.1″W

Constellation is a sculpture by Santiago Calatrava, installed along the Chicago River in Chicago, Illinois. The 29-foot-tall red sculpture was privately funded.
