= End mark =

End mark may refer to

- Any terminal punctuation at the end of a sentence
  - Especially the full stop (period)
- A symbol, such as a bullet, tombstone, or miniature logo, used primarily in magazine writing, that indicates the end of an article (especially one that has been interrupted by advertising or by being split up across different sections of the publication for layout purposes).
