= Constellation Records =

Constellation Records may refer to:

- Constellation Records (Canada), a Canadian indie label, founded 1997
- Constellation Records (Chicago), a Chicago-based label, active 1963–1966
- Constellation Records (Solar), a US sublabel of SOLAR Records, active 1981–1987
