= Asterism (typography) =

Triangular symbol of three asterisks

⁂o

Asterism (typography)
- In Unicode: U+2042 ⁂ ASTERISM

Different from
- Different from: U+0B83 ஃ TAMIL SIGN VISARGA; U+2234 ∴ THEREFORE; U+2235 ∵ BECAUSE; U+002A * ASTERISK

In typography, an asterism, ⁂, is a typographic symbol consisting of three asterisks placed in a triangle, which is used for a variety of purposes. The name originates from the astronomical term for a group of stars.

The asterism was originally used as a type of dinkus in typography, though increasingly rarely. It can also be used to mean "untitled" or author or title withheld – as seen, for example, in some editions of Album for the Young by composer Robert Schumann (№ 21, 26, and 30).

In meteorology, an asterism in a station model plot indicates moderate snowfall.

== Dinkus ==
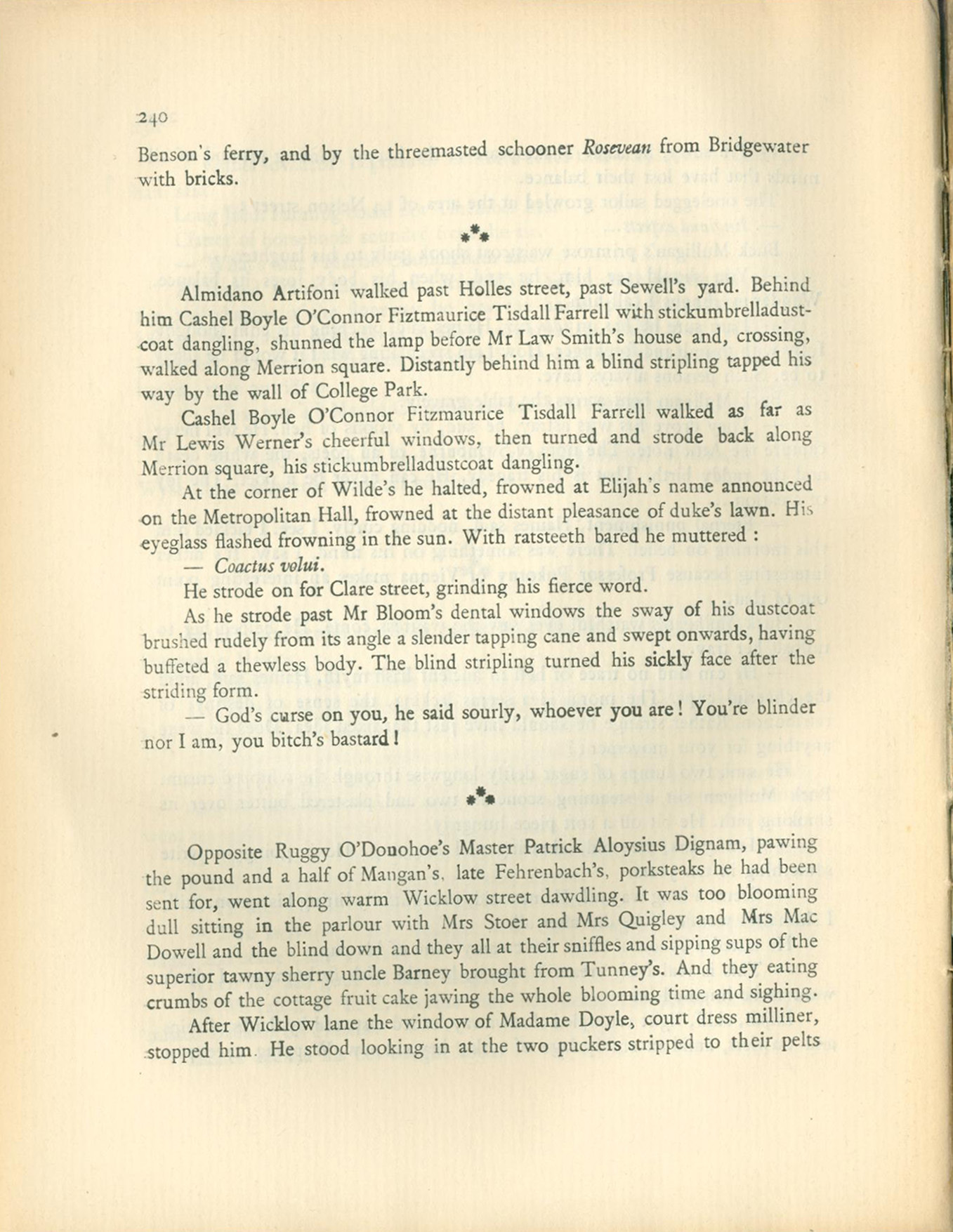
Asterisms used as dinkuses in the James Joyce novel Ulysses, the "Wandering Rocks" chapter, from the 1922 edition. The 1961 edition used a hollow white star (☆), and the 1984 edition used a row of three asterisks.

A dinkus is a typographical device to divide text, such as at section breaks. Its purpose is to "indicate minor breaks in text", to call attention to a passage, or to separate sub-chapters in a book. An asterism used this way is thus a type of dinkus: nowadays this usage of the symbol is nearly obsolete. More commonly used dinkuses are three dots or three asterisks in a horizontal row.

== See also ==
- Asterism (disambiguation) (other uses of the word)
- Dingbat – Typographic symbol class
- Ellipsis – Triple-dot punctuation mark
- Signature mark – Mark identifying a section in bookbinding
