= Section (typography) =

Subdivision of a chapter

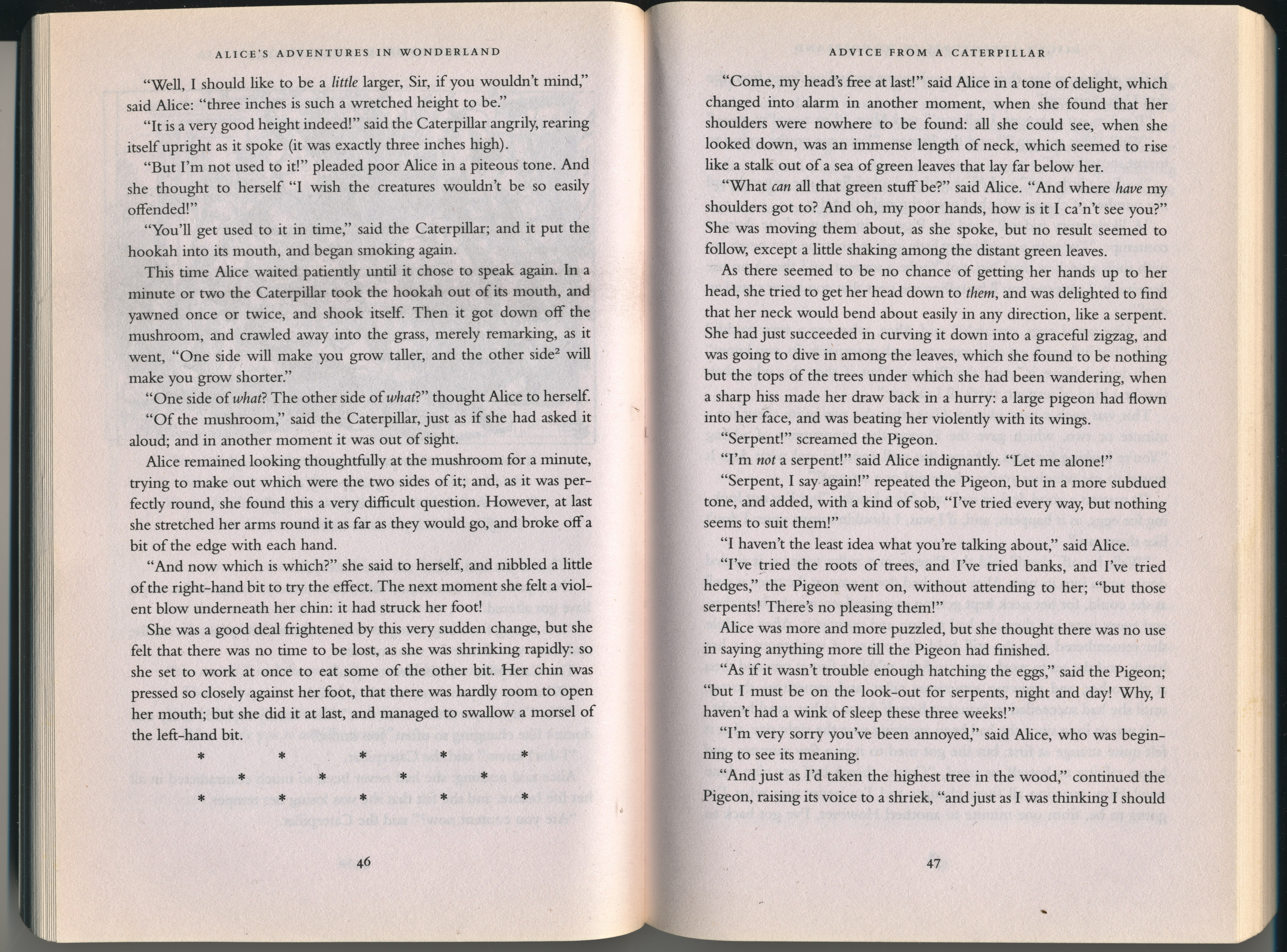
Open pages of the book Alice's Adventures in Wonderland, showing an ornate section break on the lower left page created from asterisks. It is used to signal a pause for the reader and a transition in the narrative.

In books and documents, a section is a subdivision, especially of a chapter.

In fiction, sections often represent scenes, and accordingly the space separating them is sometimes also called a scene break. Scene breaks represent gaps in story time that do not correspond to discourse time, and thus reveal the story-discourse distinction.

In law, sections are divisions of legislation that may be deeply nested to as little as single sentences.

== Section form and numbering ==
Some documents, especially legal documents, may have numbered sections, such as Section Two of the Canadian Charter of Rights and Freedoms or Internal Revenue Code section 183. The symbol § (section sign) prefixed to a number indicates that it is the number of a section detailed elsewhere.

The dotted-decimal section-numbering scheme commonly used in scientific and technical documents is defined by International Standard ISO 2145.

== In HTML ==
The <section> tag may be used in semantic HTML to mark part of a webpage as a section.

The <hr/> element originally represented a page-width horizontal rule, and now has the semantics of a "paragraph-level thematic break" which may be rendered in various ways. In the Wikipedia markup language, it is represented as four hyphens ---- on their own line and renders like this:

previous section

following section

== See also ==
- Asterism – Triangular symbol of three asterisks (⁂) sometimes used to indicate a section break in literature
- Dinkus – Typographic device ( * * * ) to indicate a change
- Fleuron (typography) – Printer's ornamental flourish (for example, ❦)
- Paragraph – Self-contained unit of discourse in writing
- Paragraphos – Ancient Greek paragraph markers
- Section (bookbinding) – Group of printed leaves, folded in the middle and bound together into a book binding
