= Chapter (books) =

Section of text in a book

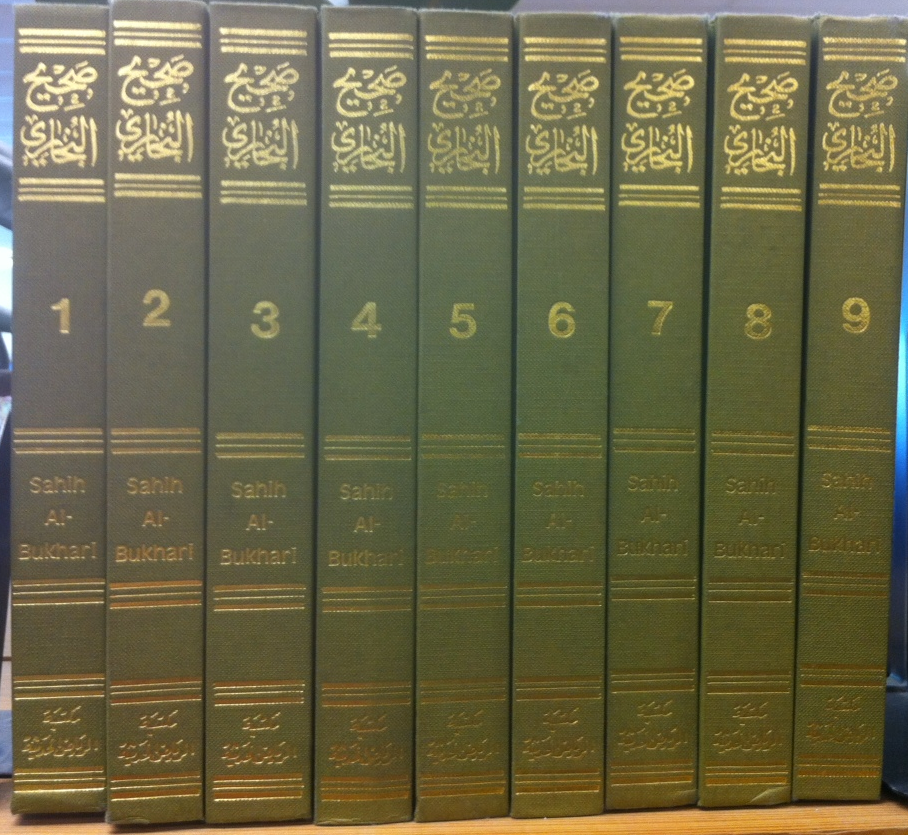
Books of Sahih Bukhari, featuring 3882 chapters.

A chapter (capitula in Latin; sommaires in French) is any of the main thematic divisions within a writing of relative length, such as a book of prose, poetry, or law. A book with chapters (not to be confused with the chapter book) may have multiple chapters that respectively comprise discrete topics or themes. In each case, chapters can be numbered, titled, or both. An example of a chapter that has become well known is "Down the Rabbit-Hole", which is the first chapter from Alice's Adventures in Wonderland.

== History of chapter titles ==
Many ancient books had neither word divisions nor chapter divisions. In ancient Greek texts, some manuscripts began to add summaries and make them into tables of contents with numbers, but the titles did not appear in the text, only their numbers. Some time in the fifth century CE, the practice of dividing books into chapters began. Jerome (d. 420) is said to have used the term capitulum to refer to numbered chapter headings and index capitulorum to refer to tables of contents. Augustine did not divide his major works into chapters, but in the early sixth century, Eugippius did. Medieval manuscripts often had no titles, only numbers in the text and a few words, often in red, following the number.

== Chapter structure ==
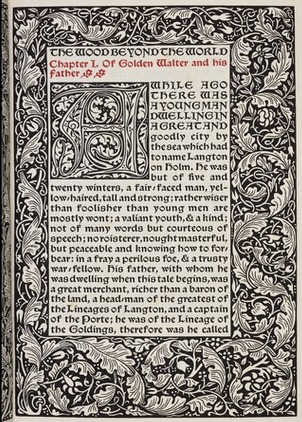
The opening page of The Wood Beyond the World (1894) by William Morris. The chapter title is at the top, in red text.

Many novels of great length have chapters. Non-fiction books, especially those used for reference, almost always have chapters for ease of navigation. In these works, chapters are often subdivided into sections. Larger works with a lot of chapters often group them in several 'parts' as the main subdivision of the book.

The chapters of reference works are almost always listed in a table of contents. Novels sometimes use a table of contents, but not always. If chapters are used they are normally numbered sequentially; they may also have titles, and in a few cases an epigraph or prefatory quotation. In older novels it was a common practice to summarise the content of each chapter in the table of contents and/or in the beginning of the chapter.

== Unusual numbering schemes ==
In works of fiction, authors sometimes number their chapters eccentrically, often as a metafictional statement. For example:

- Seiobo There Below by László Krasznahorkai has chapters numbered according to the Fibonacci sequence.
- The Curious Incident of the Dog in the Night-Time by Mark Haddon only has chapters which are prime numbers.
- At Swim-Two-Birds by Flann O'Brien has only one chapter: the first page is titled Chapter 1, but there are no further chapter divisions.
- God, A Users' Guide by Seán Moncrieff is chaptered backwards (i.e., the first chapter is chapter 20 and the last is chapter 1). The novel The Running Man by Stephen King also uses a similar chapter numbering scheme.
- Every novel in the series A Series of Unfortunate Events by Lemony Snicket has thirteen chapters, except the final instalment (The End), which has a fourteenth chapter formatted as its own novel.
- Mammoth by John Varley has the chapters ordered chronologically from the point of view of a non-time-traveler, but, as most of the characters travel through time, this leads to the chapters defying the conventional order.
- Ulysses by James Joyce has its 18 chapters labelled as episodes, with 3 books split between them.

== Book-like ==
In ancient civilizations, books were often in the form of papyrus or parchment scrolls, which contained about the same amount of text as a typical chapter in a modern book. This is the reason chapters in recent reproductions and translations of works of these periods are often presented as "Book 1", "Book 2" etc.

In the early printed era, long works were often published in multiple volumes, such as the Victorian triple decker novel, each divided into numerous chapters. Modern omnibus reprints will often retain the volume divisions. In some cases the chapters will be numbered consecutively all the way through, such that "Book 2" might begin with "Chapter 9", but in other cases the numbering might reset after each part (i.e., "Book 2, Chapter 1"). Even though the practice of dividing novels into separate volumes is rare in modern publishing, many authors still structure their works into "Books" or "Parts" and then subdivide them into chapters. A notable example of this is The Lord of the Rings which consists of six "books", each with a recognizable part of the story, although it is usually published in three volumes.

== Literature ==
- Dames, Nicholas (2023). The Chapter: A Segmented History from Antiquity to the Twenty-First Century. Princeton: Princeton University Press. ISBN 9780691135199.

== See also ==
- Asterism (typography)
- Chapter book
- Chapters and verses of the Bible
- Index (publishing)
- Section (typography)
- Table of contents
