= Asterisk =

Typographical symbol (*)

*o

Asterisk
- In Unicode: U+002A * ASTERISK (&ast;, &midast;)

Related
- See also: U+203B ※ REFERENCE MARK (komejirushi); U+A673 ꙳ SLAVONIC ASTERISK

The asterisk (/ˈæstərɪsk/), *, is a typographical symbol that is a stylised image of a star. (Note: There are many other typographical symbols resembling stars with which the asterisk should not be confused.) An asterisk is usually five- or six-pointed in print and six- or eight-pointed when handwritten, though more complex forms exist. Its most common use is to call out a footnote. It is also often used to censor words considered offensive. It is often vocalized as star, especially by computer scientists and mathematicians (as, for example, in the A* search algorithm or C*-algebra).

== Etymology ==
The English term asterisk is from Late Latin asteriscus, from Ancient Greek ἀστερίσκος, asteriskos, "little star".

The word asterisk is sometimes said as if it were pronounced astericks or asterix due to a process called metathesis. Because of this, some people have erroneously inferred that astericks is the plural of a singular asterick. A 2014 survey of the Usage Panel of The American Heritage Dictionary of the English Language found that 24% of panelists thought the asterix pronunciation was acceptable and 19% found asterick to be acceptable. However, only 7% and 6% of panelists preferred the pronunciation of asterix and asterick respectively.

== History ==
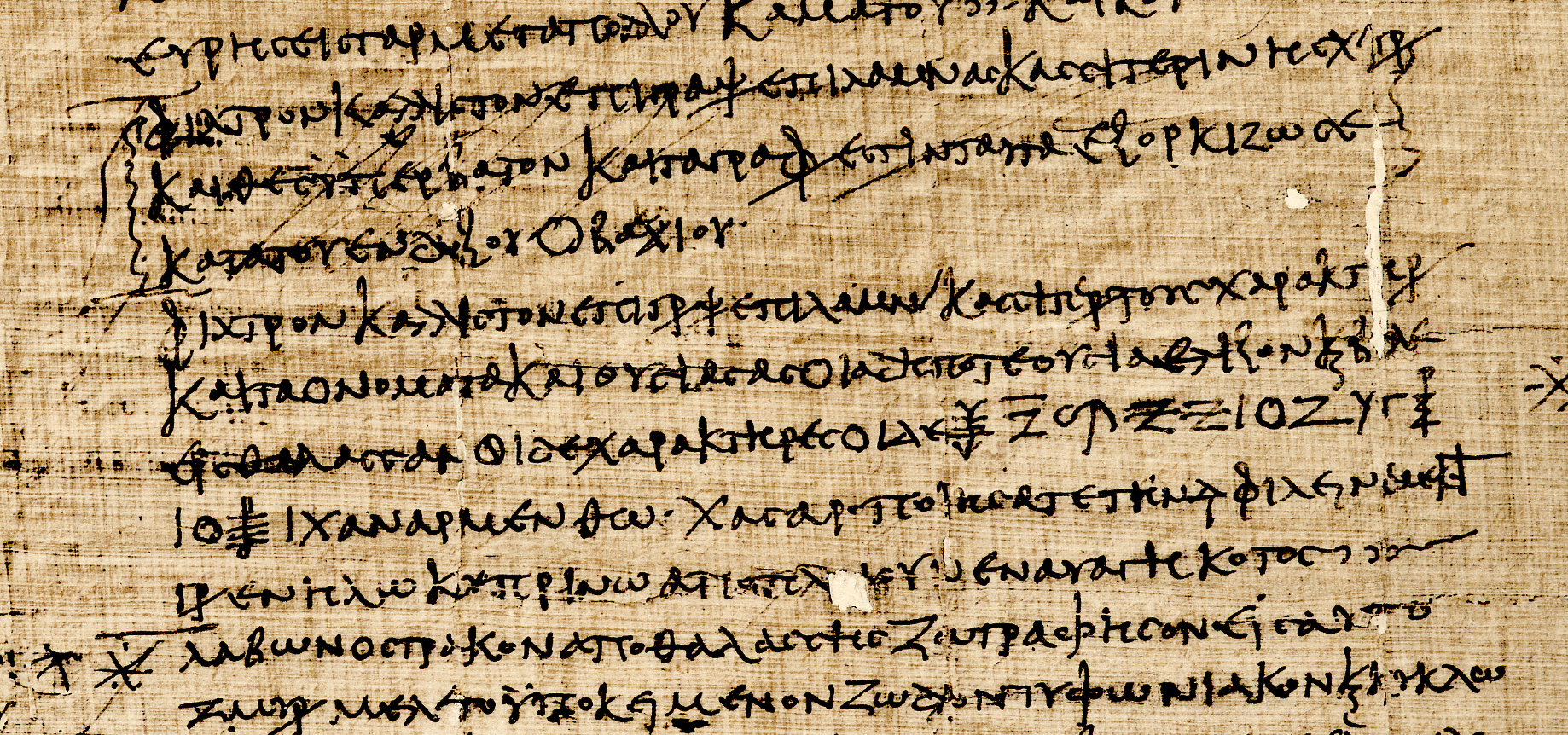
The asteriskos used in an early Greek papyrus.

One hypothesis for the origin of the asterisk used to mark notes is that it stems from the 5,000-year-old Sumerian character dingir, 𒀭, though this hypothesis seems to only be based on visual appearance.

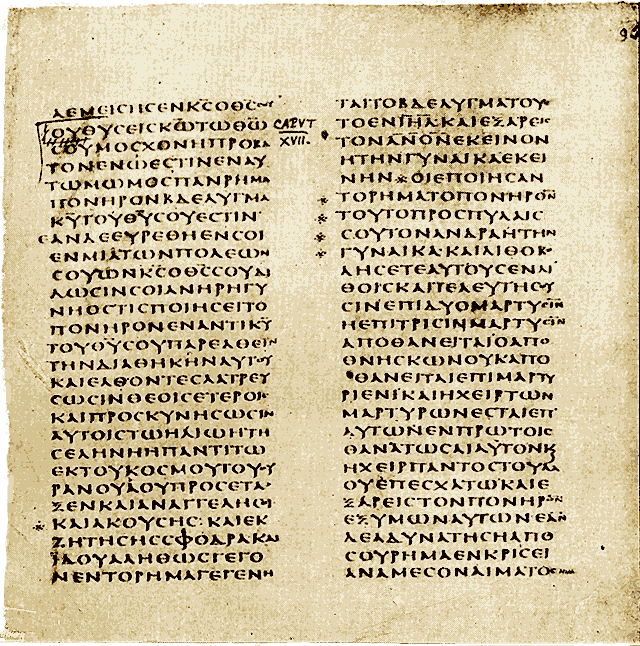
Early asterisks seen in the margin of Greek papyrus.

The asterisk was one of several symbols developed by scholars of Homeric poetry at the Library of Alexandria over 2,000 years ago. Zenodotus, the first librarian at the Alexandrian Mouseion, used the obelus, a symbol placed in the margins to indicate a line found to be spurious. A later librarian, Aristophanes, continued the use of the obelus along with other textual notations like a small star for passages that did not make sense. Aristophanes' student and successor, Aristarchus of Samothrace, introduced a formal system of textual criticism marks including the obelus, asteriskos, and several other Aristarchian symbols. Aristarchus used the asteriskos to mark lines that were duplicated elsewhere, and the asterisk combined with the obelus to indicate lines considered to be spurious duplications. Origen is known to have later used the asteriskos to mark missing Hebrew lines from his Hexapla. In the Middle Ages, the asterisk (along with other symbols like the manicule) was used to emphasize a particular part of a text, often linking those parts of the text to a marginal comment. The asterisk was frequently used to indicate footnotes in the era of print media.

== Usage ==
=== Censorship ===
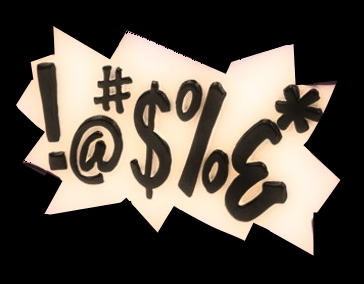
Grawlix ending in an asterisk

When toning down expletives, asterisks are often used to replace letters. For example, the word "badword" might become "ba***rd", "b*****d", "b******" or even "*******". Vowels tend to be censored with an asterisk more than consonants, but the intelligibility of censored profanities with multiple syllables such as "b*dw*rd" and "b*****d" or "ba****d", or uncommon ones is higher if put in context with surrounding text. In comics, an entire swear word may be replaced with a grawlix, a string of typographic symbols used to indicate undefined profanity.

Asterisks are one method used to redact nonpublic information. When a document containing classified information is published, the document may be redacted or "sanitized" by replacing the classified information with asterisks. This has notably been the case in the public release of the UK's Intelligence and Security Committee Russia report.

=== Competitive sports and games ===
In colloquial usage, an asterisk attached to a sporting record indicates that it is somehow tainted. This is because results that have been considered dubious or set aside are recorded in the record books with an asterisk rendering to a footnote explaining the reason or reasons for concern. During the first decades of the 21st century, the asterisk came to denote a tainted accomplishment, initially due to its use in North American sports records. This "tainted" usage soon spread to American politics.

==== Baseball ====
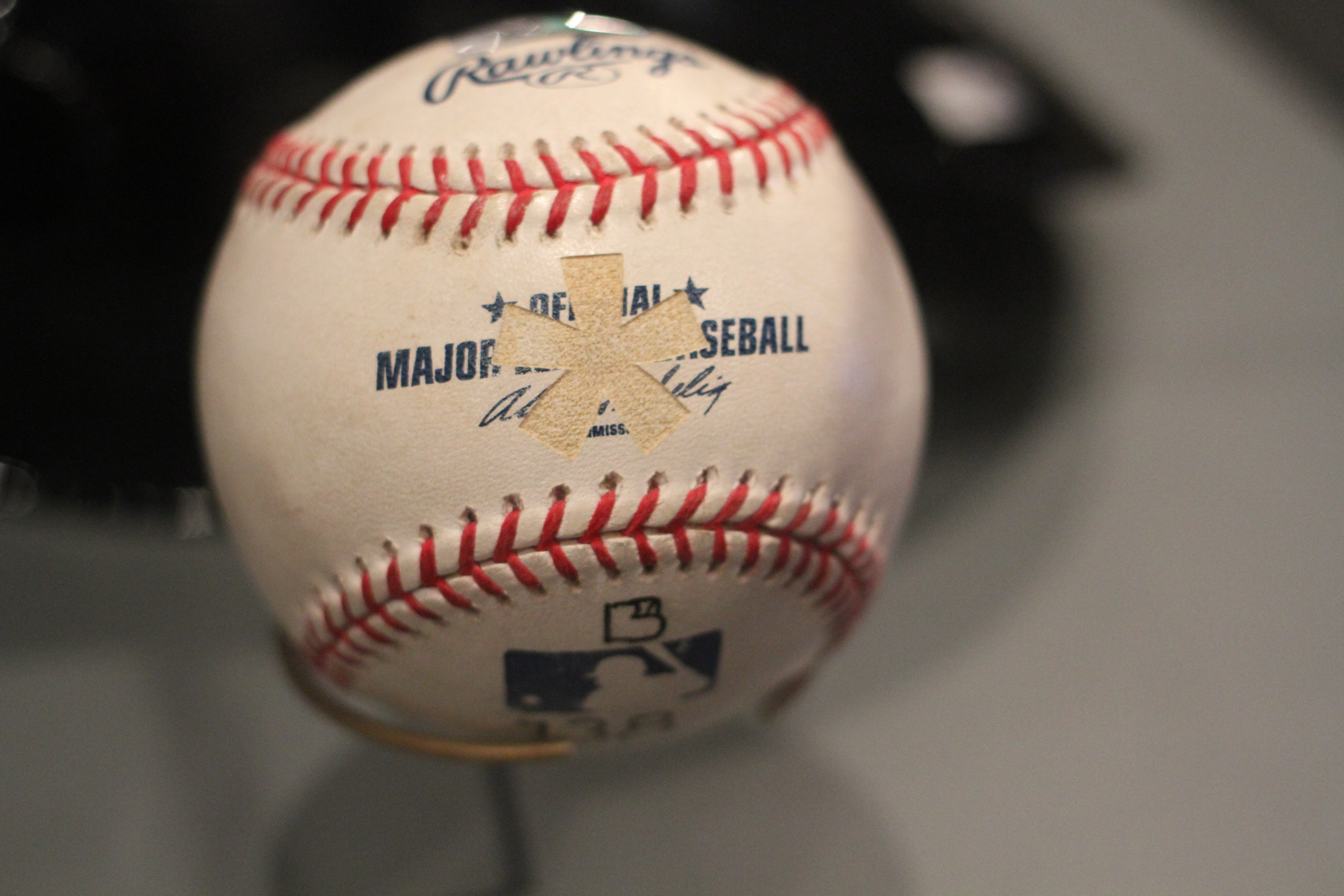
Barry Bonds' 756th* home run baseball at the National Baseball Hall of Fame and Museum

The usage of the term in sports arose during the 1961 baseball season in which Roger Maris of the New York Yankees was threatening to break Babe Ruth's 34-year-old single-season home run record. Ruth had amassed 60 home runs in a season with only 154 games, but Maris was playing the first season in the American League's newly expanded 162-game season. Baseball Commissioner Ford C. Frick, a friend of Ruth's during the legendary slugger's lifetime, held a press conference to announce his "ruling" that should Maris take longer than 154 games both records would be acknowledged by Major League Baseball, but that some "distinctive mark" [his term] be placed next to Maris', which should be listed alongside Ruth's achievement in the "record books". The asterisk as such a mark was suggested at that time by New York Daily News sportswriter Dick Young, not Frick. The reality, however, was that MLB had no direct control over any record books until many years later, and it all was merely a suggestion on Frick's part. Within a few years the controversy died down and all prominent baseball record keepers listed Maris as the single-season record holder for as long as he held the record.

Nevertheless, the stigma of holding a tainted record remained with Maris for many years, and the concept of a real or figurative asterisk denoting less-than-accepted "official" records has become widely used in sports and other competitive endeavors. A 2001 TV movie about Maris's record-breaking season was called 61* (pronounced sixty-one asterisk) in reference to the controversy.

Uproar over the integrity of baseball records and whether or not qualifications should be added to them arose again in the late 1990s, when a steroid-fueled power explosion led to the shattering of Maris' record. Even though it was obvious - and later admitted - by Mark McGwire that he was heavily on steroids when he hit 70 home runs in 1998, ruling authorities did nothing - to the annoyance of many fans and sportswriters. Three years later self-confessed steroid-user Barry Bonds pushed that record out to 73, and fans once again began to call for an asterisk in the sport's record books.

Fans were especially critical and clamored louder for baseball to act during the 2007 season, as Bonds approached and later broke Hank Aaron's career home run record of 755.

The Houston Astros' 2017 World Series win was marred after an investigation by MLB revealed the team's involvement in a sign-stealing scheme during that season. Fans, appalled by what they perceived to be overly lenient discipline against the Astros players, nicknamed the team the "Houston Asterisks".

==== Cricket ====
The asterisk has several uses in cricket:

- It signifies a total number of runs scored by a batsman without losing their wicket; e.g. "107*" means "107 not out".
- Where only the scores of the two batsmen that are currently in are being shown, an asterisk following a batsman's score indicates that he is due to face the next ball to be delivered.
- When written before a player's name on a scorecard, it indicates the captain of the team.
- It is also used on television when giving a career statistic during a match. For example, "47*" in a number of matches column means that the current game is the player's 47th.

=== Computing ===
In computer science, the asterisk is commonly used as a wildcard character, or to denote pointers, repetition, or multiplication.

- In regular expressions, the asterisk is used to denote zero or more repetitions of a pattern; this use is also known as the Kleene star or Kleene closure after Stephen Kleene.
- In Unified Modeling Language, the asterisk is used to denote zero to many classes.
- In some command line interfaces, such as Unix shells and Microsoft's CMD, the asterisk is the wildcard character (or wildcard symbol) and stands for any string of characters. A common use of the wildcard is in searching for files on a computer. For instance, if a user wished to find a document called Document 1, search terms such as Doc* and D*ment* would return this file. Due to being a wildcard, they could also return files like Document 2 and (only the latter) Dark Knight Monument.jpg. Document* would in fact return any file that begins with Document, and D*ment* any file that began with D and had 'ment' somewhere in its name.
- In some graphical user interfaces, an asterisk is pre- or affixed to the current working document name shown in a window's title bar to indicate that unsaved changes exist.
- In many computing and Internet applications, an asterisk is displayed in place of the characters of sensitive or confidential visible information, such as a password.
- In Commodore (and related) file systems, an asterisk appearing next to a filename in a directory listing denotes an improperly closed file, commonly called a "splat file".
- In travel industry Global Distribution Systems, the asterisk is the display command to retrieve all or part of a Passenger Name Record.
- In HTML web forms, a (usually red) asterisk can be used to denote required fields.
- Chat room etiquette calls on one asterisk to correct a misspelled word or typo that has already been submitted. For example, one could post lck, then follow it with *luck or luck* (the placement of the * on the left or right is a matter of personal style) to correct the word's spelling, or if it's someone else that notices the mistake, they might also use *luck or luck*. This also applies to typos that result in a different word from the intended one but are correctly spelled.
- In comics, enclosing a word or phrase between two asterisks is used to denote an action the subject is "performing", e.g. *cough*.
- In Markdown and other markup languages, surrounding a set of characters or words in one asterisk italicizes, two asterisks bolds, and three asterisks both italicizes and bolds. See the table below for examples of all three uses of the asterisk in Markdown, including how it translates to HTML and how it renders.

Markdown	Italicized text is the *cat's meow*.	I just love **bold text**.	This text is ***really important***.
HTML	Italicized text is the <em>cat's meow</em>.	I just love <strong>bold text</strong>.	This text is <em><strong>really important</strong></em>.
Rendered Output	Italicized text is the cat's meow.	I just love bold text.	This text is really important.

==== Adding machines and printing calculators ====
- Some models of adding machines and printing calculators use the asterisk to denote the total, or the terminal sum or difference of an addition or subtraction sequence, respectively. The symbol is sometimes given on the printout to indicate this total.

==== Programming languages ====
Many programming languages and calculators use the asterisk as a symbol for multiplication. It also has a number of special meanings in specific languages, for instance:

- In some languages such as C, C++, Rust and Go, the asterisk is used to dereference or declare a pointer variable.
- In Common Lisp, the names of global variables are conventionally set off with asterisks, *LIKE-THIS*.
- In Ada, Fortran, Perl, Python, Ruby, some dialects of Pascal, and many others, a double asterisk is used to signify exponentiation: 5**3 is 5^{3} = 125.
- In Perl, the asterisk is used to refer to the typeglob of all variables with a given name.
- In Ruby and Python, the asterisk has two specific uses. First, the unary * operator applied to a list object inside a function call will expand that list into the positional arguments of the function call. Second, a parameter preceded by * in the parameter list in a function definition will result in any extra positional parameters being aggregated into a tuple (Python) or array (Ruby), and likewise a parameter preceded by ** will result in any extra keyword parameters being aggregated into a dictionary (Python) or hash (Ruby). An example in Python 3:

def function1(a, b, c, d):
    print(a, b, c, d)
    
def function2(first, *args):
    # args will be a tuple
    # the name 'args' is convention: it may be any parameter name
    print(args)
    
def function3(first, **kwargs):
    # kwargs will be a dict
    # the name 'kwargs' is convention: it may be any parameter name
    print(kwargs)

function1(1, 2, 3, 4) # prints 1 2 3 4
function1(*[1, 2, 3, 4]) # prints 1 2 3 4
function1(**{"a": 5, "b": 6, "c": 7, "d": 8}) # prints 5 6 7 8

function2(1, 2, 3, 4) # prints (2, 3, 4), 1 is not part of args
function2(99) # prints (), unfilled *parameter will be ()

function3(0, e = 3, f = 9) # prints {'e': 3, 'f': 9}, 0 is not part of kwargs
function3(0) # prints {}, unfilled **parameter will be {}

- In APL, the asterisk represents the exponential and exponentiation functions, with *X representing e^{X}, and Y*X representing Y^{X}.
- In IBM Job Control Language, the asterisk has various functions, including in-stream data in the DD statement, the default print stream as SYSOUT=*, and as a self-reference in place of a procedure step name to refer to the same procedure step where it appears.
- In Haskell, the asterisk represents the set of well-formed, fully applied types; that is, a 0-ary kind of types.

===== Comments in programming languages =====
In the B programming language and languages that borrow syntax from it, such as C, PHP, Java, or C#, comments in the source code (for information to people, ignored by the compiler) are marked by an asterisk combined with the slash:

 /* This section displays message if user input was not valid
    (comment ignored by compiler) */

CSS also uses this comment format:

body {
  /* This ought to make the text more readable for far-sighted people */
  font-size: 24pt;
}

Some Pascal-like programming languages, such as Object Pascal, Modula-2, Modula-3, and Oberon, and other languages such as ML, Wolfram Language (Mathematica), AppleScript, OCaml, Standard ML, and Maple, use an asterisk combined with a parenthesis:

 (* Do not change this variable - it is used later
    (comment ignored by compiler) *)

Each computing language has its own way of handling comments; /* ... */ and similar notations are not universal.

==== History of information technology ====
The asterisk was a supported symbol on the IBM 026 Keypunch (introduced in 1949 and used to create punch cards with data for early computer systems). It was also included in the FIELDATA character encoding and the ASCII standard.

=== Economics ===
- In economics, the use of an asterisk superscript indicates that the variable such as price, output, or employment is at its optimal level (that which is achieved in a perfect market situation). For instance, $p^*$ is the price level $p$ when output $y$ is at its corresponding optimal level of $y^*$.
- Also in international economics asterisks are commonly used to denote economic variables in a foreign country. So, for example, $p$ is the price of the home good and $p^*$ is the price of the foreign good, etc.

=== Education ===
- In the A-Level examinations in the United Kingdom and the PSLE in Singapore, A* ("A-star") is a special top grade that is distinguished from grade A.
- In the Hong Kong Diploma of Secondary Education (HKDSE) examination in Hong Kong, 5** (5-star-star) and 5* (5-star) are two special top grades that are distinguished from Level 5. Level 5** is the highest level a candidate can attain in HKDSE.

=== Fluid mechanics ===
In fluid mechanics an asterisk in superscript is sometimes used to mean a property at sonic speed.

=== Games ===
- Certain categories of character types in role-playing games are called splats, and the game supplements describing them are called splatbooks. This usage originated with the shorthand "*book" for this type of supplement to various World of Darkness games, such as Clanbook: Ventrue (for Vampire: The Masquerade) or Tribebook: Black Furies (for Werewolf: The Apocalypse), and this usage has spread to other games with similar character-type supplements. For example, Dungeons & Dragons Third Edition has had several lines of splatbooks: the "X & Y" series including Sword & Fist and Tome & Blood prior to the "3.5" revision, the "Complete X" series including Complete Warrior and Complete Divine, and the "Races of X" series including Races of Stone and Races of the Wild.
- In Magic: The Gathering, an asterisk is used on a creature's power and/or toughness when it's a variable amount.
- In many MUDs and MOOs, as well as "male", "female", and other more esoteric genders, there is a gender called "splat", which uses an asterisk to replace the letters that differ in standard English gender pronouns. For example, h* is used rather than him or her. Also, asterisks are used to signify doing an action, for example, "*action*".
- Game show producer Mark Goodson used a six-pointed asterisk as his trademark. It is featured prominently on many set pieces from The Price Is Right.
- Scrabble players put an asterisk after a word to indicate that an illegal play was made.

=== Human genetics ===
- In human genetics, * is used to denote that someone is a member of a haplogroup and not any of its subclades (see * (haplogroup)).

=== Linguistics ===
In linguistics, an asterisk may be used for a range of purposes depending on what is being discussed. The symbol is used to indicate reconstructed words that are not attested for in surviving texts, including words of proto-languages. For modern languages, it may be placed before posited problematic word forms, phrases or sentences to flag that they are hypothetical, ungrammatical, unpronounceable, etc.

Historical linguist August Schleicher is cited as first using the asterisk for linguistic purposes, specifically for unattested forms that are linguistic reconstructions.

Using the asterisk for descriptive and not just historical purposes arose in the 20th century. By analogy with its use in historical linguistics, the asterisk was variously prepended to "hypothetical" or "unattested" elements in modern language. Its usage also expanded to include "non-existent" or "impossible" forms. Leonard Bloomfield (1933) uses the asterisk with forms such as *cran, impossible to occur in isolation: cran- only occurs within the compound cranberry. Such usage for a "non-existent form" was also found in French, German and Italian works in the middle of the 20th century.

Asterisk usage in linguistics later came to include not just impossible forms, but "ungrammatical sentences", those that are "ill formed for the native speaker". The expansion of asterisk usage to entire sentences is often credited to Noam Chomsky, but Chomsky in 1968 already describes this usage as "conventional". Linguist Fred Householder claims some credit, but Giorgio Graffi argues that using an asterisk for this purpose predates his works. (Note: "...Chomsky adopted, with some delay, a convention which had been (possibly) circulated among generative grammarians by Householder. However, Householder (who was not a generative grammarian) was simply following a practice which had already been introduced by others, and which was so automatic as to be adopted almost unconsciously.")

The meaning of the asterisk usage in specific linguistic works may go unelucidated so can be unclear. (Note: The numerous and confusing uses are detailed in Householder (1973).) Linguistics sometimes uses double asterisks (**), another symbol such as the question mark, or both symbols (e.g. ?*) to indicate degrees of unacceptability.

==== Historical linguistics ====
In historical linguistics, the asterisk marks words or phrases that are not directly recorded in texts or other media, and that are therefore reconstructed on the basis of other linguistic material by the comparative method.

In the following example, the Proto-Germanic word *ainlif is a reconstructed form.

- *ainlif → endleofan → eleven

A double asterisk (**) sometimes indicates an intermediary or proximate reconstructed form (e.g. a single asterisk for reconstructed thirteenth century Chinese and a double asterisk for reconstructions of older Ancient Chinese or a double asterisk for proto-Popolocan and a single asterisk for intermediary forms).

In other cases, the double asterisk denotes a form that would be expected according to a rule, but is not actually found. That is, it indicates a reconstructed form that is not found or used, and in place of which another form is found in actual usage:

- For the plural, **kubar would be expected, but separate masculine plural akābir أكابر and feminine plural kubrayāt كبريات are found as irregular forms.

==== Ungrammaticality ====
In most areas of linguistics, but especially in syntax, an asterisk in front of a word or phrase indicates that the word or phrase is not used because it is ungrammatical.

- wake her up / *wake up her

An asterisk before a parenthesis indicates that the lack of the word or phrase inside is ungrammatical, while an asterisk after the opening bracket of the parenthesis indicates that the existence of the word or phrase inside is ungrammatical. For example:

- go *(to) the station
- go (*to) home

Use of an asterisk to denote forms or sentences that are ungrammatical is often complemented by the use of the question mark (?) to indicate a word, phrase or sentence that is avoided, questionable or strange, but not necessarily outright ungrammatical. (Note: One article notes succinctly that "...common practice in linguistics [is that] an asterisk preceding a word, a clause or a sentence is used to indicate ungrammaticality or unacceptability, while a question mark is used to indicate questionable usage", another that, "A question mark indicates that the example is marginal; an asterisk indicates unacceptability" and another that "examples preceded by an asterisk are ungrammatical, and those preceded by a question mark would be considered strange".)

Other sources go further and use several symbols (e.g. the asterisk, question mark, and degree symbol °) to indicate gradations or a continuum of acceptability. (Note: One example is "rough approximations of acceptability are given in four gradations and indicated as follows: normal and preferred, no mark; acceptable but not preferred, degree sign °; marginally acceptable, question mark (?); unacceptable, asterisk (*).")

===== Ambiguity =====
Since a word marked with an asterisk could mean either "unattested" or "impossible", it is important in some contexts to distinguish these meanings. In general, authors retain asterisks for "unattested", and prefix ^{x}, **, †, or ? for the latter meaning. (Note: For example, one linguistic article states that, "A question mark (?) denotes uncertainty; an asterisk (*) indicates a classificatory base not encountered in my own data.") An alternative is to append the asterisk (or another symbol, possibly to differentiate between even more cases) at the end.

==== Optimality theory ====
In optimality theory, asterisks are used as "violation marks" in tableau cells to denote a violation of a constraint by an output form.

==== Phonetic transcription ====
In phonetic transcription using the International Phonetic Alphabet and similar systems, an asterisk was historically used to denote that the word it preceded was a proper noun. See this example from W. Perrett's 1921 transcription of Gottfried Keller's Das Fähnlein der sieben Aufrechten:

ˈkɑinə ˈreːdə, virt ˈniçts daˈraˑus! zɑːktə *ˈheːdigər ˈkurts.
(»Keine Rede, wird nichts daraus!« sagte Hediger kurz.)

This convention is no longer usual.

=== Mathematics ===
The asterisk has many uses in mathematics. The following list highlights some common uses and is not exhaustive.

stand-alone

- An arbitrary point in some set. Seen, for example, when computing Riemann sums or when contracting a simply connected group to the singleton set $\{\ast\}$.

as a unary operator, denoted in prefix notation

- The Hodge star operator on vector spaces $*: A^k \rightarrow A^{n-k}$.

as a unary operator, written as a subscript

- The pushforward (differential) of a smooth map $f$ between two smooth manifolds, denoted $f_*$.
- And more generally the application of any covariant functor, where no doubt exists over which functor is meant.

as a unary operator, written as a superscript

- The complex conjugate of a complex number (the more common notation is $\bar{z}$).
- The conjugate in a composition algebra
- The conjugate transpose, Hermitian transpose, or adjoint matrix of a matrix.
- Hermitian adjoint.
- The multiplicative group of the units of a ring; when the ring is a field, this is the group of all nonzero elements. For example, $\mathbb{C}^* = \mathbb{C}\setminus\{0\}.$
- The dual space of a vector space $V$, denoted $V^*$.
- The combination of an indexed collection of objects into one example, e.g. the combination of all the cohomology groups $H^k(X)$ into the cohomology ring $H^*(X)$.
- The reflexive transitive closure of a binary relation.
- In statistics, $z^*$ and $t^*$ are given critical points for $z$-distributions and $t$-distributions, respectively.

as a binary operator, in infix notation

- A notation for an arbitrary binary operator.
- The free product of two groups.
- $f \ast g$ is a convolution of $f$ with $g$.
- A notation for the horizontal composition of two natural transformations.
- A notation to denote a parallel sum of two operands (most authors, however, instead use a $:$ or $\parallel$ sign for this purpose).

The asterisk is used in all branches of mathematics to designate a correspondence between two quantities denoted by the same letter – one with the asterisk and one without.

==== Mathematical typography ====
In fine mathematical typography, the Unicode character U+2217 ∗ ASTERISK OPERATOR (in HTML, &lowast;; not to be confused with U+204E ⁎ LOW ASTERISK) is available. This character also appeared in the position of the regular asterisk in the PostScript symbol character set in the Symbol font included with Windows and Macintosh operating systems and with many printers. It should be used for a large asterisk that lines up with the other mathematical operators, sitting on the math centerline rather than on the text baseline.

=== Music ===
- In musical notation the sign (U+1D1AF 𝆯 MUSICAL SYMBOL PEDAL UP MARK) indicates when the sustain pedal of the piano should be lifted.
- In liturgical music, an asterisk is often used to denote a deliberate pause.

=== Religious texts ===
- In the Geneva Bible and the King James Bible, an asterisk is used to indicate a marginal comment or scripture reference.
- In the Leeser Bible, an asterisk is used to mark off the seven subdivisions of the weekly Torah portion. It is also used to mark the few verses to be repeated by the reader of the Haftara.
- In American printings of the Book of Common Prayer, an asterisk is used to divide a verse of a Psalm in two portions for responsive reading. British printings use a spaced colon (" : ") for the same purpose.
- In pointed psalms, an asterisk is used to denote a break or breath.

=== Star of Life ===
The Star of Life may represent emergency medical services

A Star of Life, a six-bar asterisk overlaid with the Rod of Asclepius (the symbol of health), may be used as an alternative to cross or crescent symbols on ambulances.

=== Statistical results ===
In many scientific publications, the asterisk is employed as a shorthand to denote the statistical significance of results when testing hypotheses. When the likelihood that a result occurred by chance alone is below a certain level, one or more asterisks are displayed. Popular significance levels are <0.05 (*), <0.01 (**), and <0.001 (***).

=== Telephony ===
On a tone dialling telephone keypad, the star key is one of the two special keys (the other is the square key – almost invariably replaced by the number sign # (called 'pound sign' (US), 'hash' (other countries), or 'hex'), and is found to the left of the zero). For the star key, the International Telecommunication Union recommends U+26B9 ⚹ SEXTILE (in E.161). The Unicode Consortium suggests U+2217 ∗ ASTERISK OPERATOR as a valid alternative usage of that character They are used to navigate menus in systems such as voice mail, or in vertical service codes and Unstructured Supplementary Service Data (USSD; quick codes/feature codes).

=== Typography ===
- The asterisk is used to call out a footnote, especially when there is only one on the page. Less commonly, multiple asterisks are used to denote different footnotes on a page (i.e., *, **, ***). Typically, an asterisk is positioned after a word or phrase and preceding its accompanying footnote. Other characters are also used for this purpose, such as dagger (†, ‡) or superscript letters and numbers (as in Wikipedia). In marketing and advertising, asterisks or other symbols are used to refer readers discreetly to terms or conditions for a certain statement, the "small print".
- In English-language typography the asterisk is placed after all other punctuation marks (for example, commas, colons, or periods) except for the dash.

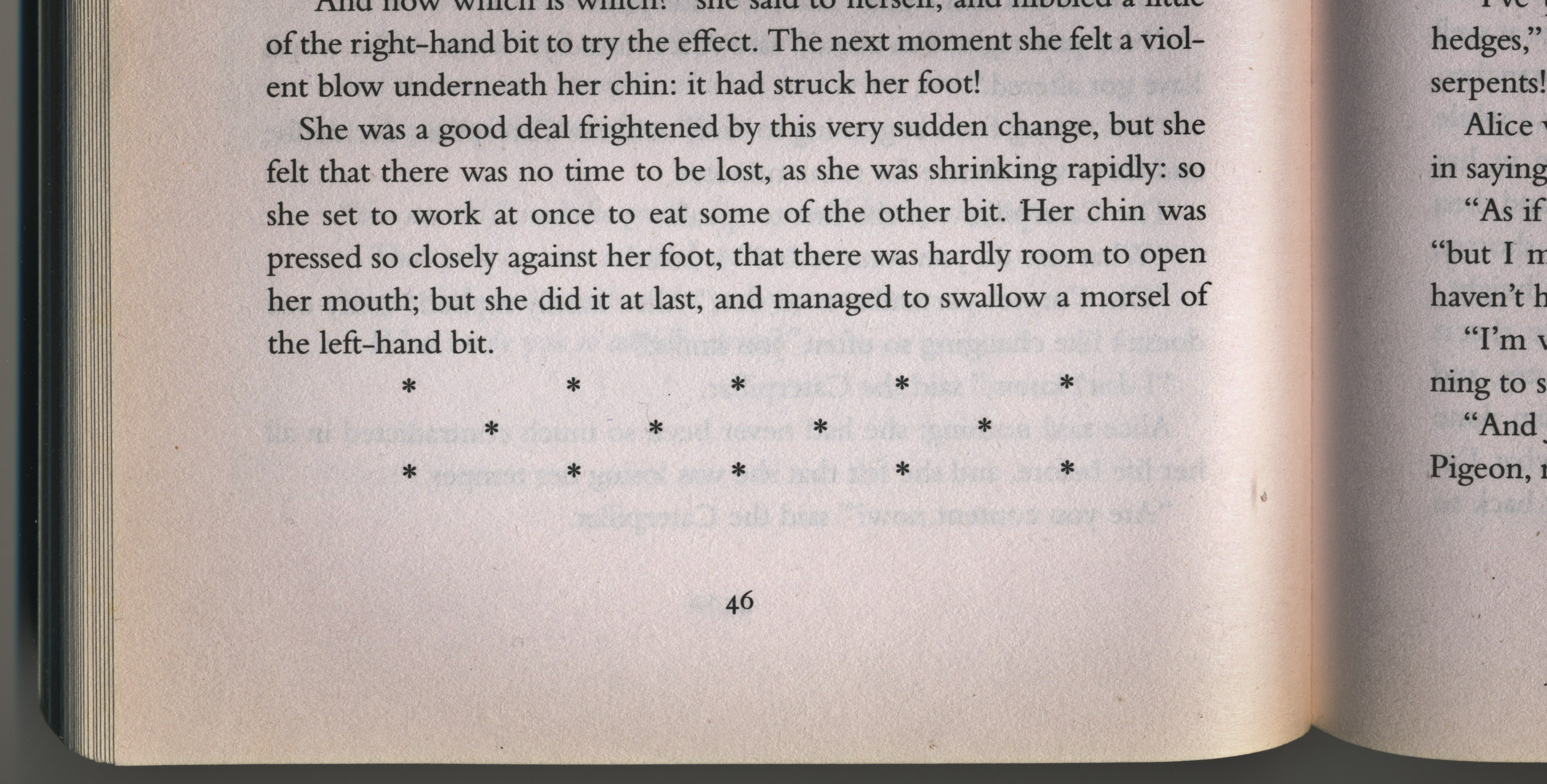
Asterisks used to illustrate a section break in Alice's Adventures in Wonderland

- Three spaced asterisks centered on a page is called a dinkus and may represent a jump to a different scene, thought, or section.
- A group of three asterisks arranged in a triangular formation is called an asterism. It may be used instead of a name on a title page.
- One or more asterisks may be used as censorship over all or part of a word.
- Asterisks are sometimes used as an alternative to typographical bullets to indicate items of a list.
- Asterisks can be used in textual media to represent *emphasis* when bold or italic text is not available (e.g., Twitter, text messaging).
- Asterisks may denote conversational repair, or corrections to misspelling or misstatements in previous electronic messages, particularly when replacement or retraction of a previous writing is not possible, such as with "immediate delivery" messages or "instant messages" that can not be edited. Usually this takes the form of a message consisting solely of the corrected text, with an asterisk placed before (or after) the correction. For example, one might send a message reading "*morning" or "morning*" to correct the misspelling in the message "I had a good mroning".
- Bounding asterisks as "a kind of self-describing stage direction", as linguist Ben Zimmer has put it. For example, in "Another gas station robbery *sigh*", the writer uses *sigh* to express disappointment (but does not necessarily literally sigh).
- Bounding asterisks can also represent an action in online situations where they aren't shown.

=== Unique uses in other languages ===
==== German ====
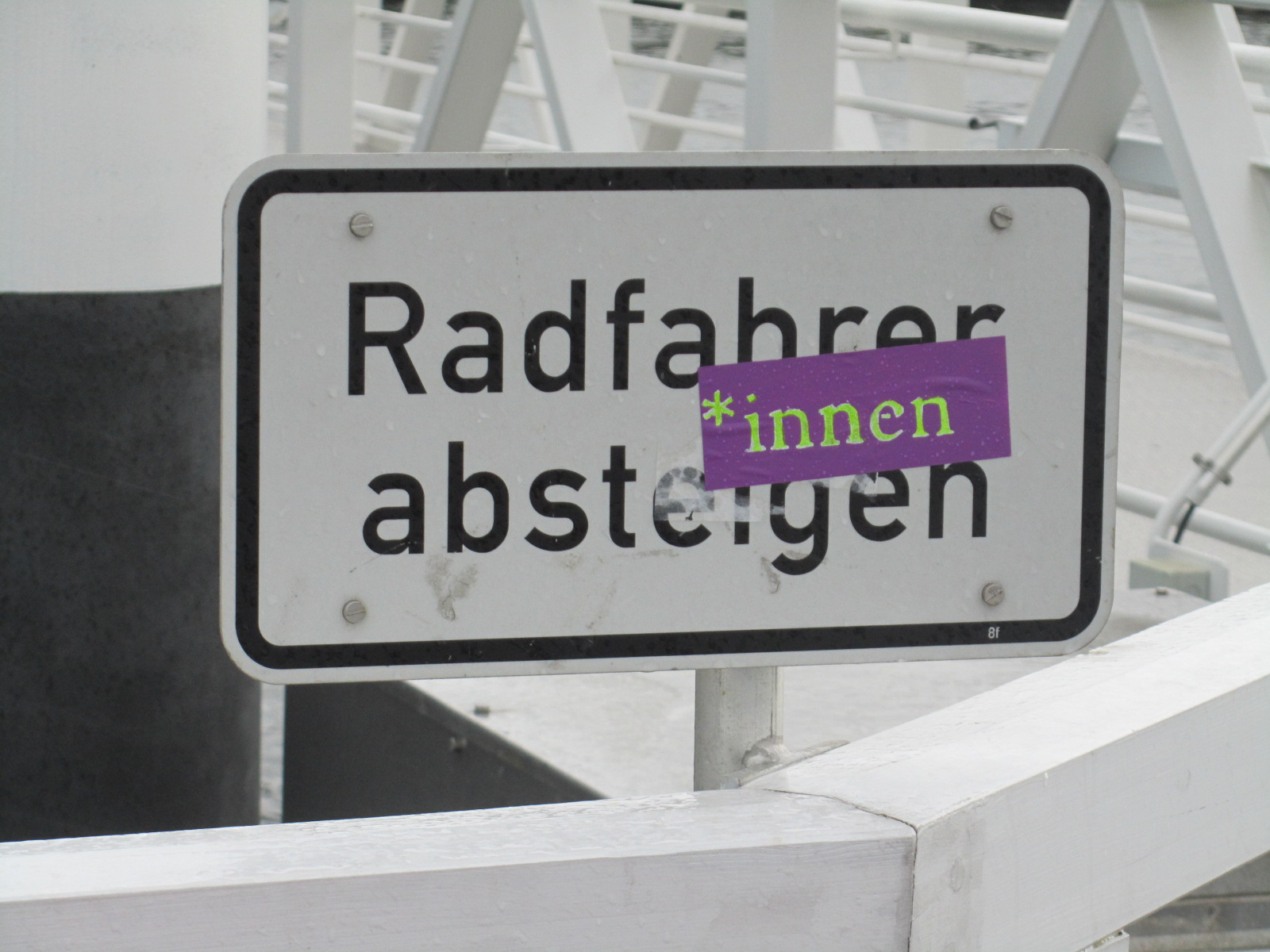
This sign, reading Radfahrer absteigen (Cyclists, dismount), has been amended with a gender star to make it gender-neutral.

The gender star (German: Genderstern, or diminutive Gendersternchen; lit. 'gender asterisk') is a nonstandard typographic style used by some authors in gender-neutral language in German.

It is formed by placing an asterisk after the stem and appending the feminine plural suffix "-innen". For example, Fahrer ([male] driver, singular & plural) becomes Fahrer*innen (drivers). The gender star makes it possible to refer to all genders while also including non-binary people.

In speech, the gender star is sometimes signalled by a glottal stop.

Alternatives to the gender star include Binnen-I (with medial capital I), the gender gap (where an underscore takes the place of the asterisk) or using inherently gender neutral terms, such as 'people' instead of 'man' or 'woman'.

The gender star was named the German Anglicism of the Year in 2018 by the Leibniz-Institut für Deutsche Sprache.

== Encodings ==
The Unicode standard has a variety of asterisk-like characters, compared in the table below. (Characters will display differently in different browsers and fonts.) The reason there are so many is chiefly because of the controversial decision to include in Unicode the entire Zapf Dingbats symbol font.

Asterisk	Asterisk operator	Heavy asterisk	Small asterisk	Full-width asterisk	Open-centre asterisk
*	∗	✱	﹡	＊	✲

Low asterisk	Arabic star	East Asian reference mark	Teardrop-spoked asterisk	Sixteen-pointed asterisk
⁎	٭	※	✻	✺

=== In Unicode ===
- U+002A * ASTERISK (&ast;, &midast;)
- U+0359 ◌͙ COMBINING ASTERISK BELOW͙
- U+066D ٭ ARABIC FIVE POINTED STAR
- U+203B ※ REFERENCE MARK
- U+2055 ⁕ FLOWER PUNCTUATION MARK
- U+2042 ⁂ ASTERISM
- U+204E ⁎ LOW ASTERISK
- U+2051 ⁑ TWO ASTERISKS ALIGNED VERTICALLY
- U+20F0 ◌⃰ COMBINING ASTERISK ABOVE
- U+2217 ∗ ASTERISK OPERATOR (&lowast;) May be used as the star key (telephony)
- U+229B ⊛ CIRCLED ASTERISK OPERATOR (&circledast;, &oast;)
- U+2722 ✢ FOUR TEARDROP-SPOKED ASTERISK
- U+2723 ✣ FOUR BALLOON-SPOKED ASTERISK
- U+2724 ✤ HEAVY FOUR BALLOON-SPOKED ASTERISK
- U+2725 ✥ FOUR CLUB-SPOKED ASTERISK
- U+2731 ✱ HEAVY ASTERISK
- U+2732 ✲ OPEN CENTRE ASTERISK
- U+2733 ✳ EIGHT SPOKED ASTERISK
- U+273A ✺ SIXTEEN POINTED ASTERISK
- U+273B ✻ TEARDROP-SPOKED ASTERISK
- U+273C ✼ OPEN CENTRE TEARDROP-SPOKED ASTERISK
- U+273D ✽ HEAVY TEARDROP-SPOKED ASTERISK
- U+2743 ❃ HEAVY TEARDROP-SPOKED PINWHEEL ASTERISK
- U+2749 ❉ BALLOON-SPOKED ASTERISK
- U+274A ❊ EIGHT TEARDROP-SPOKED PROPELLER ASTERISK
- U+274B ❋ HEAVY EIGHT TEARDROP-SPOKED PROPELLER ASTERISK
- U+29C6 ⧆ SQUARED ASTERISK
- U+2A6E ⩮ EQUALS WITH ASTERISK (&easter;)
- U+A673 ꙳ SLAVONIC ASTERISK
- U+FE61 ﹡ SMALL ASTERISK
- U+FF0A ＊ FULLWIDTH ASTERISK
- U+1D1AF 𝆯 MUSICAL SYMBOL PEDAL UP MARK
- U+1F7AF 🞯 LIGHT FIVE SPOKED ASTERISK
- U+1F7B0 🞰 MEDIUM FIVE SPOKED ASTERISK
- U+1F7B1 🞱 BOLD FIVE SPOKED ASTERISK
- U+1F7B2 🞲 HEAVY FIVE SPOKED ASTERISK
- U+1F7B3 🞳 VERY HEAVY FIVE SPOKED ASTERISK
- U+1F7B4 🞴 EXTREMELY HEAVY FIVE SPOKED ASTERISK
- U+1F7B5 🞵 LIGHT SIX SPOKED ASTERISK
- U+1F7B6 🞶 MEDIUM SIX SPOKED ASTERISK
- U+1F7B7 🞷 BOLD SIX SPOKED ASTERISK
- U+1F7B8 🞸 HEAVY SIX SPOKED ASTERISK
- U+1F7B9 🞹 VERY HEAVY SIX SPOKED ASTERISK
- U+1F7BA 🞺 EXTREMELY HEAVY SIX SPOKED ASTERISK
- U+1F7BB 🞻 LIGHT EIGHT SPOKED ASTERISK
- U+1F7BC 🞼 MEDIUM EIGHT SPOKED ASTERISK
- U+1F7BD 🞽 BOLD EIGHT SPOKED ASTERISK
- U+1F7BE 🞾 HEAVY EIGHT SPOKED ASTERISK
- U+1F7BF 🞿 VERY HEAVY EIGHT SPOKED ASTERISK
- U+E002A TAG ASTERISK

== See also ==
- Arabic star – Punctuation mark used for Arabic
- Asterism (typography) – Triangular symbol of three asterisks
- Dagger (mark) – Typographical symbol (†)
- Dinkus – Typographic device ( * * * ) to indicate a change
- Obelism – Editors' marks on manuscripts, for example to identify errors
- List of typographical symbols and punctuation marks
- Reference mark (komejirushi), the symbol used in Chinese, Japanese and Korean typography for an equivalent purpose
- Sextile – an asterisk-like astrological symbol (⚹), six lines radiating at 60⁰ intervals
