= 2010 Australia Day Honours =

The 2010 Australia Day Honours are appointments to various orders and honours to recognise and reward good works by Australian citizens. The list was announced on 26 January 2010 by the Governor General of Australia, Quentin Bryce.

The Australia Day Honours are the first of the two major annual honours lists, the first announced to coincide with Australia Day (26 January), with the other being the Queen's Birthday Honours, which are announced on the second Monday in June.

† indicates an award given posthumously.

== Order of Australia ==
=== Companion (AC) ===
==== General Division ====
Recipient	Citation	Notes
Donald Robert Argus AO	For eminent service to business and commerce through leadership in the mining and finance industries, and to the community through the promotion of philanthropy, and executive roles in conservation, health, charitable and sporting organisations.	
Professor Elizabeth Helen Blackburn	For eminent service to science as a leader in the field of biomedical research, particularly through the discovery of telomerase and its role in the development of cancer and ageing of cells and through contributions as an international adviser in Bioethics.	
James Oswald Fairfax AO	For eminent service to the community through support and philanthropy for the visual arts, conservation organisations and building programs for medical research and educational facilities.	
The Honourable Justice Robert Shenton French	For eminent service to the law and to the judiciary, to legal education and administration in the areas of constitutional, competition and native title law, and to legal reform.	

==== Military Division ====
Branch	Recipient	Citation	Notes
Army	Lieutenant General David John Hurley AO DSC	For eminent service to the Australian Defence Force as Chief of Capability Development Group, Chief of Joint Operations and Vice Chief of the Defence Force.	

=== Officer (AO) ===
==== General Division ====
Recipient	Citation	Notes
Neil Richard Balnaves	For service to the community through philanthropic support for the arts, education, medical research and Indigenous programs, and to business.	
The Honourable Justice Bernard Daniel Bongiorno	For service to the law, particularly as a Justice of the Supreme Court of Victoria, and through leadership roles within the Italian community.	
Professor Anthony Lawrence Cunningham	For service to medicine, particularly in the field of viral research and through the development and leadership of medical and biomedical research.	
Michael D'Ascenzo	For service to public administration, particularly through reform and innovative engagement with the taxation profession and other Government agencies.	
The Honourable Justice Bruce Malcolm Debelle	For service to the law and the judiciary, particularly through the Supreme Court of South Australia, and to the community.	
Professor Jennifer Marshall Graves	For service to scientific research in the field of genetics, particularly of Australian marsupials and monotremes and their relevance to international understanding of human evolution.	
The Honourable Raymond John Groom	For service to the Parliament of Tasmania as Premier and through a range of portfolio responsibilities, and to the community through leadership roles within organisations supporting Indigenous, aged and welfare groups.	
Dr Stephen John Gumley	For service to public sector management, particularly through leadership of the Defence Materiel Organisation, and the development and implementation of significant reforms in procurement and sustainment of military equipment.	
Dr Jeffrey Allan Harmer	For service to public administration through leadership of key policy initiatives, particularly programs for housing assistance, child support, mental health, the disabled and insurance reform, and through initiatives for Indigenous Australians.	
Professor Wendy Elizabeth Hoy	For service to medical research in the field of chronic disease, particularly renal disease, through the promotion of health service delivery reform and as an advocate for Indigenous health in Australia and the United States of America.	
Mark Johnson	For service to business, particularly through contributions to the Asia-Pacific Economic Cooperation and the Australian Strategic Policy Institute, through development and leadership roles within the finance sector, and to health care organisations.	
Stephen Russell Lawrence	For service to the community through leadership roles in the development and implementation of not-for-profit ventures to create social change, particularly for youth and the long-term unemployed.	
Hieu Van Le	For service to the community in South Australia, particularly through roles contributing to the enhancement of a multicultural society.	
The Reverend Dr Peter John L'Estrange	For service to higher education and to the community through the Catholic Church as an administrator and academic.	
The Honourable David Daniel Levine RFD QC	For service to the judiciary and to the law through the Supreme Court of New South Wales and leadership of state and national boards of review.	
Paul Alexander Little	For service to the development of the transport and logistics industries through strategic leadership and promotion of corporate social and environmental responsibility, and to the community through philanthropic support of sporting and medical research organisations.	
Professor John Denison McMillan	For service to the law as the Commonwealth Ombudsman, particularly in the areas of immigration and law enforcement, through leadership roles in professional bodies and as an academic.	
Ian Robert McRae	For service to the performing arts through leadership, executive and advisory roles, particularly of The Australian Ballet, Bangarra Dance Theatre and through contributions to UNESCO.	
Robert Lee Maple-Brown	For service to the community through leadership and executive roles with a range of charitable organisations in the areas of the arts, health, welfare, medical research and education, and through philanthropy.	
Naomi Milgrom	For service to business as a leader and mentor in the fashion industry, and to the community through advisory and management roles of a wide range of arts, health and philanthropic bodies.	
His Excellency Mr Paul Thomas O'Sullivan	For service to public administration through significant contributions to the advancement of Australia's security and the development of international relations.	
Dr George Romano Santoro AM	For service to medicine through contributions to a wide range of advisory and professional bodies, and to the Italian community.	
Dr Ronald Silberberg	For service to the building and construction industries through the promotion of housing affordability, contributions to improved public and social housing and the development of youth training programs.	
Virginia Scott Simmons	For service to education as a leader and advocate for vocational education and training, through reform of the Victorian TAFE Association, contributions to professional organisations, international advisory roles and as a mentor to women.	
Steven Michael Skala	For service to the visual and performing arts through roles supporting wider community access, to business and commerce, and to the community through the promotion of educational opportunities for young Australians.	
Richard Leo Tognetti	For service to music through leadership of the Australian Chamber Orchestra, as an internationally acclaimed violinist, through the development and promotion of educational programs for children, support for emerging artists and contributions to charitable organisations.	
The Honourable Murray Rutledge Wilcox QC	For service to the law as a Judge and a Law Reform Commissioner, particularly in the areas of environmental, native title and industrial law.	

==== Military Division ====
Branch	Recipient	Citation	Notes
Navy	Vice Admiral Russell Harry Crane AM, CSM, RAN	For distinguished service as Deputy Chief of Navy and as Chief of Navy.	
Army	Major General Anthony Peter Fraser AM, CSC	For distinguished service to the Australian Army in the fields of aviation and project management as Director General Army Aviation Systems Branch and Head Helicopter Systems Division in the Defence Materiel Organisation.	
Army	Major General David Lindsay Morrison AM	For distinguished service to the Australian Army in the fields of training and education, military strategic commitments and force structure and capability; in particular, as Commander Australian Defence College, Head Military Strategic Commitments and Deputy Chief of Army.	

=== Member (AM) ===
==== General Division ====
Recipient	Citation	Notes
Dr Mohammed Taha Alsalami	For service to the community, particularly through roles assisting refugees and migrants.	
Dr William Edward (Bill) Andersen	For service to religious education through a range of academic and professional roles, and to the Scripture Union movement.	
Dr Richard Huish Ashby	For service to emergency medicine, to medical administration, and to a range of professional associations.	
Geoffrey David Askew	For service to the aviation industry through contributions to security policy and the development of improved crisis management programs.	
Sheree Gai Bailey	For service to humanitarian aid through the International Campaign to Ban Landmines, and through programs assisting survivors.	
The Honourable Bruce George Baird	For service to the Parliament of Australia, and to the community of New South Wales through a range of business, tourism and welfare organisations.	
Kathleen Evelyn Baker	For service to the nursing profession through contributions to education and the promotion of clinical excellence in health care.	
Maureen Patricia Barron	For service to the Australian film and television industry through administrative and representational roles.	
Barbara Belcher	For service to public sector management and administration, particularly in the areas of policy development, advice and delivery and through the advancement of ethical standards and values.	
Professor David William Black	For service to education and to the social sciences, particularly through the promotion and preservation of the political and parliamentary history of Western Australia.	
Andrew Phillip Blair	For service to education through the development and implementation of innovative programs and policies and through contributions to a range of professional associations.	
Dr Leslie Edward Bolitho	For service to medicine as a clinician and educator and through the development of rural and regional health services in north east Victoria.	
Gregory Colin Boulton	For service to Australian Rules football administration, to the community of South Australia, and to business.	
Dr Michael Joseph Boyer	For service to medical oncology as an educator and clinical researcher and through the development of integrated care facilities for people with cancer.	
David Gary Boymal	For service to accountancy, and to the development and implementation of financial reporting standards in Australia.	
Peter Phillip Brennan	For service to the community of the Macarthur region through a range of health, educational and social welfare organisations, and to the housing industry.	
Professor Peter Michael Brooks	For service to medicine, particularly in the field of rheumatology, as an academic, researcher and clinician.	
Professor Graham Vallancey Brown	For service to medicine in the field of infectious diseases, particularly malaria and through a range of professional, research and advisory organisations.	
Philip John Bruem	For service to the dairy industry, particularly through the implementation and promotion of advanced technology, and to the community.	
Professor Peter Jude Butcher	For service to teacher education, particularly in the Catholic sector, and to the community through contributions to social justice.	
Gary Byron	For service to court administration, particularly through executive and administrative roles.	
Professor John Francis Cade	For service to medicine in the field of intensive care as a clinician, researcher and educator and through contributions to professional associations.	
The Honourable George Cash	For service to the Parliament of Western Australia, and to the community.	
Dr Turab Chakera	For service to diagnostic radiology as a clinician and educator and through a range of professional associations.	
Professor John Christodoulou	For service to human genetics, particularly the metabolic disorders of children as a researcher and clinician.	
John Cloney	For service to the insurance industry, particularly through professional associations, and to the community through the CREATE Foundation and a range of youth and sporting organisations.	
Suzanne Noreen Colbert	For service to people with disabilities through a range of employment programs and work experience initiatives.	
Professor Max Coltheart	For service to cognitive psychology as a researcher and academic, and to people with learning difficulties.	
Mark Raymond Compton	For service to the community, particularly through St John Ambulance Australia and through executive and volunteer roles with a range of hospital, health care and medical research organisations.	
Murray James Cook	For service to the arts, particularly children's entertainment, and to the community as a benefactor and supporter of a range of charities.	
The Honourable John Alexander Cowdell	For service to the Parliament of Western Australia, to regional development, and to the community, particularly through contributions to history and heritage.	
Professor William Charles Curnow	For service to the construction industry, particularly as an architect of correctional, educational and bio-secure facilities, through the promotion and support of collaborative research projects and as an educator.	
Ian Sidney Curtis	For service to overseas humanitarian aid, particularly through executive roles with World Vision International.	
John Simon Curtis	For service to business, and to the community through roles supporting charitable, youth and welfare organisations.	
Professor Annette Jane Dobson	For service to public health and biostatistics as a researcher and academic, particularly through the collection and analysis of data relating to cardiovascular disease and women's and veterans' health.	
Roger Kevin Drake	For service to the grocery industry in South Australia, and to the community through support for a range of charitable organisations.	
Anne Murren Dunn	For service to rural women, to a range of arts and cultural organisations, and to local government through administrative roles.	
Professor Patricia Lynn Easteal	For service to the community, education and the law through promoting awareness and understanding of violence against women, discrimination and access to justice for minority groups.	
Emeritus Professor Kenneth John Eltis	For service to education through teaching, administrative and research roles and through the design and implementation of innovative curriculum and reporting methods.	
Jeffrey Wayne Fatt	For service to the arts, particularly children's entertainment, and to the community as a benefactor and supporter of a range of charities.	
Anthony Donald Field	For service to the arts, particularly children's entertainment, and to the community as a benefactor and supporter of a range of charities.	
The Honourable Gavin Leonard Fielding	For service to the law, and to industrial relations as a practitioner and educator, and to the community of Western Australia.	
Karen Marie Flanagan	For service to the community in the area of child protection through contributions to policy and program development and legislative reform.	
Professor Michael Henry Fraser	For service to the arts, particularly through the promotion of the interests and rights of Australian authors and artisans.	
Sandra Anne French	For service to local government in Tasmania, and to the community through a range of health, women's, arts and youth organisations.	
Karen Margaret Fryar	For service to the community of the Australian Capital Territory as a magistrate and through contributions to the prevention of family violence.	
Professor Robert Alexander Gardiner	For service to medicine and to medical research in the field of urology.	
Dr Patricia Jessie Giles	For service to the community through organisations and advisory bodies that promote the interests of women, and to the Parliament of Australia.	
Roslyn Joy Giles	For service to the community, particularly in the field of social work, as an educator, researcher and practitioner, through professional associations and health care.	
Donald Alexander Gillies	For service to marine engineering and naval architecture, particularly through education and the development of professional standards, and to the community.	
The Reverend Dr Geoffrey Thomas Glassock	For service to the community through the development of programs and services to assist people experiencing grief and bereavement, and to the Anglican Church of Australia.	
Dr Peter David Goldsworthy	For service to literature as an author and poet, through arts administration, and to the community.	
Dr Susan Heather Graham-Taylor	For service to conservation and the environment through executive roles with a range of organisations, through the development of protection measures relating to air quality and the management of waste, and as an historian.	
Roger Ernest Greenman	For service to medical administration, to the development of social outreach programs, and to church and charitable organisations.	
Professor Jenny Gregory	For service to the community as an historian and academic and through the promotion and preservation of local and regional history in Western Australia.	
Dr Ian Edward Grey	For service to science, particularly in the field of mineralogy as a crystallographer, and to the mineral sands export industry.	
Patrick Grier	For service to the health care industry through executive and administrative roles, to the provision of improved services for psychiatric care and as a supporter of a range of medical and charitable organisations.	
Richard Andrew Gross	For service to local government, particularly through the Municipal Association of Victoria, as a contributor to environmental reform initiatives in the area of waste management, and to the community of Port Phillip.	
Peter James Hall	For service to the community through philanthropic contributions to a range of medical, arts and charitable organisations, and to the finance management industry.	
Tonina Louise Harvey	For service to nurse education through the development of clinical guidelines and programs for the nursing care of patients affected by drug and alcohol abuse, to professional organisations, as a clinician and as an administrator.	
Matthew Lawrence Hayden	For service to cricket, and to the community through support for a range of health, youth and charitable organisations.	
Kenneth Francis Helm	For service to the Australian wine industry as a winemaker, through the promotion of the Riesling white grape variety and as a supporter of cool climate wine producers, and to the community of the Canberra/Yass region.	
Alan Gilbert Henderson PSM	For continued service to public administration, particularly in the area of policy formulation and advice, and to the management of taskforces of the 2002 Commonwealth Heads of Government Meeting and the 2007 Asia-Pacific Economic Co-operation Meeting.	
John Byrne Horgan	For service to the Australian wine industry as a producer and exporter, to the promotion of wine-based tourism in Western Australia, to tertiary education through advisory roles, and to the community.	
James Wilson Howard RFD	For service to the Australian pharmaceutical industry through executive roles, to legislative reform, and to the financial management and education sectors.	
Timothy John Jarvis	For service to conservation and the environment, particularly through advisory roles to developing countries regarding land sustainability and resource management, as an explorer, and to the community.	
David Wynne Jones OAM	For continued service to youth through executive roles with the Scouting movement and as the national coordinator of the Scouts 100 Year Water Tank Project.	
Dr Peter Douglas Jones	For service to the information technology industry, to the promotion of internet-based communications networks, and to science education.	
Professor Robert McLaren Jones	For service to medicine as a surgeon, researcher and author, particularly in the area of liver transplantation laparoscopic surgery, as a mentor and through support for organ donation programs.	
Peter Charles Joseph OAM	For service to the community, particularly through the establishment of the Black Dog Institute and contributions to the redevelopment and improvement of health care facilities.	
Diane Faye Kargas	For service to the community of the Australian Capital Territory, particularly through the establishment of the Capital Region Community Foundation, to aged persons, and to diabetes research organisations.	
Julia Marion King	For service to business through executive roles with a range of organisations, and to the community, particularly as a supporter of arts and charitable bodies.	
Professor Roger Laurence Kitching	For service to conservation science as an academic, researcher and educator, particularly in the field of tropical rainforest ecology and ecosystem management.	
Professor Byron Barnard Lamont	For service to conservation and the environment, particularly Australian flora as an educator, researcher and author.	
Francis Rex Langthorne	For service to people with an intellectual disability through activities supporting participation in sports and personal development programs through Special Olympics Australia.	
Dr David Philip Leonard	For service to psychiatric medicine as a practitioner, through contributions to public mental health services in Victoria, and through medical administration.	
Richard Denis Lester	For service to the community of Western Australia through contributions to education, health and medical research organisations, and to business.	
Dr Peter Hugh Lewis-Hughes	For service to public and medical administration in Queensland, particularly through the reform of the pathology service delivery system.	
Professor Merilyn Joyce Liddell	For service to tertiary education and administration, particularly in the discipline of medicine, and to cross-cultural exchange and co-operation with Malaysia.	
Dennis Keith Lillee MBE	For service to cricket as a player, coach and administrator at a national and international level, and through roles with charitable organisations including those providing support for children with special needs.	
Kenneth Brian Lloyd	For service to arts administration in South Australia, particularly through the development of festivals and policy and program initiatives for regional communities.	
Associate Professor Lesley Elizabeth Long	For service to medical administration, particularly in the area of nursing, to the education of nurses, and to clinical service planning.	
Steven Mark Lowy	For service to business, particularly in the retail sector, and through fundraising and philanthropic support for the arts and cultural, medical research and social policy organisations.	
John Garry McBride	For service to international relations, particularly the facilitation of business and cultural links between Australia and Japan, as a supporter of emerging artists, and to arts organisations.	
Djambawa Miniyawainy Marawili	For service to the arts as a sculptor and painter, to the preservation of Indigenous culture, to arts administration, and as a mentor of emerging artists.	
Raymond George Martin	For service to the community through voluntary roles with charitable, Indigenous, health and sporting organisations, and to the media as a television journalist.	
Neta Anne Maughan	For service to music education as a teacher of piano, voice and music theory, to professional organisations, and as a mentor of young performers.	
David Edward Meiklejohn	For service to the business sector, particularly in the field of finance, and to sport through the Melbourne Cricket Club.	
James Stephen Mein	For service to the Uniting Church in Australia through a range of roles, to the promotion of inter-faith dialogue, to education, and to the community.	
Gordon Stanley Merchant	For service to business, particularly the manufacturing sector, as a supporter of medical, youth and marine conservation organisations, and to surf lifesaving.	
John Alfred Michell	For service to the Australian wool industry, particularly through roles with professional associations and as a wool processor and exporter, and to the community.	
Nigel Stephen Milan	For service to the Australian radio and television industries, and to the community, particularly eye-health, medical and arts organisations.	
Professor Philip Bowden Mitchell	For service to medical education, particularly in the field of psychiatry, as an academic, researcher and practitioner, through contributions to the understanding, treatment and prevention of mental illnesses.	
William McLennan (Bill) Mitchell	For service to the community of Western Australia, particularly through contributions to the local government sector, to conservation and resource management, and to sporting and social welfare organisations.	
Nicholas Paul Newland	For service to conservation and the environment through a range of executive roles with natural resource organisations, as a contributor to biological management programs for rabbit population control, and to the community.	
Desmond Livingstone Nicholl	For service to the meat and dairy industries through leadership roles, to the corporate sector through business restructure and reconstruction programs, and to tennis.	
Gregory John Page	For service to the arts, particularly children's entertainment, and to the community as a benefactor and supporter of a range of charities.	
Dr Marjorie Pawsey	For service to community health as a contributor to the development of health care standards, quality assurance systems and professional accreditation programs, particularly in the area of women's health.	
Professor Alan Pearson	For service to nursing as an educator and leader in the development of evidence-based health care and clinical best practice.	
Wellesley Noel Potter	For service to architecture through a range of executive roles in professional organisations, practice education and the development and mentoring of younger members of the profession.	
Professor Ronald James Quinn	For service to scientific research, particularly in the field of chemistry as a leader in the development of therapeutic compounds from marine organisms and plant materials.	
Professor Peter John Ravenscroft	For service to the development of palliative care and medicine, particularly as an advocate for improved education of doctors and health workers in the therapeutics of palliative care.	
Dr Michael Anthony Raymond	For service to forensic science in the field of law enforcement through the development of technological advances, including blood pattern analysis and DNA-related identification, and through leadership and advisory roles.	
Eda Natalie Ritchie	For service to the community through a range of cultural, environmental, charitable and health organisations.	
Phillip John Rizk	For service to the Lebanese community through the promotion of multicultural relations and the integration of migrants into the broader community.	
Clive Walter Robartson OAM	For service to the community through local government and through the development of waste management systems.	
Dr Denise Margaret Robinson	For service to medical administration, particularly through the development of multi-agency strategies to address public health issues and the improvement of Indigenous health outcomes.	
Patricia Alice Roessler	For service to the development of relations with Vietnam through the higher education sector and a range of charitable, welfare and business organisations.	
Dr James Robert Ross	For service to geoscience through advocacy of mineral industry interests, leadership in developing research and education and the establishment of the University of Western Australia's Geoscience Foundation.	
Judith Rutherford	For service to the community through the promotion of Asian arts and culture, the advancement of clinical music therapy, and through local government.	
Diana Margaret Ryall	For service to business through executive roles in the information technology industry, as a mentor to women, and to the community.	
Dorothy Rose Sales OAM	For service to people with disabilities, particularly through the establishment of community housing for those with acquired brain injury.	
Dr Glen Richard Saunders	For service to the protection of Australia's biodiversity and agricultural production as a research leader in vertebrate pest management strategies and technologies.	
Robert Murray Savage	For service to business and commerce through executive roles in the information technology, retail, and financial sectors.	
Professor David Ferguson Scott	For service to medicine as a pioneer in the field of transplant surgery and through executive roles in professional organisations.	
Professor Frank Athol Shann	For service to medicine as a paediatrician, particularly as a leader in intensive care for children, through contributions to the World Health Organisation and to rural medicine, and as an advocate for child health.	
Henry Robert Smerdon	For service to financial management as a contributor to reform in a range of public and private sector organisations, to tertiary education, and to the arts.	
Terence John Smith MBE RFD ED	For service to the health insurance industry, particularly as a contributor to policy development and through executive roles in professional organisations.	
Ezekiel (Zeke) Solomon	For service to the law, the development of international trade and relations, and to the arts.	
Rothrewel Donald (Don) Stein	For service to the earthmoving and contracting industry, particularly as a pioneer in the rental and hire sector, and to the community through a range of health and service organisations.	
John Michael Stringer ESM OAM	For service to the maritime community through the Royal Volunteer Coastal Patrol and the integration of marine rescue resources.	
Dr Andrew Darcy Sutherland	For service to medicine as an orthopaedic surgeon, an innovator in the field of surgical education and assessment, and as a mentor of young doctors.	
Gregory Brian Sword	For service to the union movement, and to the community through leadership and voluntary roles in a range of organisations.	
Leslie Edward Taylor	For service to the financial sector, particularly in the field of banking law and corporate governance and as a contributor to the development of electronic conveyancing.	
Rodney John Taylor	For service to visual arts and art education as the Founder of the Adelaide Central School of Art and through the development of curriculum and academic standards.	
Emeritus Professor Bruce Graham Thom	For service to the environment as an adviser and advocate for the ecological management of the coastal zone, as a contributor to public debate on natural resource policy, and to the academic and professional discipline of geography.	
Robert Tong	For service to the Anglican Church of Australia through a range of diocesan and national executive and administrative roles, and to the law as a practitioner and as an academic.	
Graham David Tribe	For service to community health as a promoter of research into multiple sclerosis and through executive roles with MS Australia.	
Joyce Lorraine (Joy) Vickerstaff	For service to health care through the development of nurse education and patient care standards.	
The Honourable Justice Lloyd Stacy Waddy RFD	For service to the law, the constitutional debate, and to the community through a range of educational and arts organisations.	
Roy Ian Wakelin-King	For service to community celebrations through World Youth Day 2008, and to the public transport sector through the development of infrastructure and services.	
Leslie Nicholl Walford	For service to the performing arts, particularly in the field of theatre restoration and decoration, and to the profession of interior design.	
Professor Garry Leigh Warne	For service to medicine in the field of paediatric endocrinology, and to the improvement of child health care and infrastructure in developing countries.	
Warwick Arthur Watkins	For service to spatial information and natural resource management through leadership roles within a range of public sector agencies.	
Professor Frederick Garnett (Fred) Watson	For service to astronomy, particularly the promotion and popularisation of space science through public outreach.	
Reginald James (Reg) Watson	For service to the media as a pioneer in the creation and production of serial television drama.	
Professor Robin Jennifer Watts	For service to nursing through the development of nurse education, promotion of evidence-based health care and the establishment of ethical research standards.	
Karrie Ann Webb	For service to golf, and to the community as a benefactor and supporter of a range of health and disability organisations.	
Professor Roger Llewellyn Wettenhall	For service to education, particularly as a scholar and researcher in the field of public administration, management and governance.	
Professor Gregory Whelan	For service to medicine, particularly in the fields of gastroenterology, hepatology and addiction, through academic and executive roles.	
Allen John Windross	For service to the gaming and horseracing industries through leadership roles, particularly in the introduction of new technologies and through the promotion of responsible gambling.	

==== Military Division ====
Branch	Recipient	Citation	Notes
Navy	Rear Admiral Trevor Norman Jones CSC, RAN	For exceptional service as the Director General Navy Capability, Performance and Plans and as the Director General Military Strategic Commitments.	
Navy	Commodore Ian Richard Middleton RAN	For exceptional service to the Royal Australian Navy in a range of demanding command and management appointments, particularly as the Australian Navy Surface Force Element Group Commander.	
Navy	Commodore Robyn Margaret Walker RAN	For exceptional service as a medical officer in the Australian Defence Force.	
Army	Brigadier Ian Ross Errington CSC	For exceptional service to the Australian Defence Force as a Project Director in the Multi-National Security Transition Command – Iraq and as Head of Australian Defence Staff in Jakarta.	
Army	Lieutenant Colonel Benjamin Nicholas James	For exceptional service and leadership as the Staff Officer Grade One Personnel of Headquarters 1st Division from 2005 to 2007 and as Commanding Officer of the 2nd Battalion, Royal Australian Regiment from 2007 to 2009.	
Army	Colonel Bruce McEwan Murray	For exceptional service to the Australian Army in the fields of career management, personnel and training, particularly as the Commanding Officer of the School of Military Engineering and as the Commanding Officer of the Soldier Career Management Agency.	
Army	Brigadier Andrew Alexander Nikolic CSC	For exceptional service to the Australian Defence Force in the field of operations and international policy.	
Army	Lieutenant Colonel Stuart David Yeaman	For exceptional service as the Commander, Reconstruction Task Force Rotation Four, during Operation SLIPPER in Afghanistan from April to October 2008.	
Air Force	Wing Commander Jason Gregory Murray	For exceptional service to the Royal Australian Air Force in the fields of project management, aircraft engineering and technical training.	
Air Force	Wing Commander Simon Cullen Sauer CSC	For exceptional service to the Royal Australian Air Force as Staff Officer Force Protection at Headquarters Combat Support Group and as Commanding Officer, Royal Australian Air Force Security and Fire School.	
Air Force	Air Vice Marshal Mark Alan Skidmore	For exceptional service as the Air Commander Australia, as the Director General-Air Joint Operations Command, and as the Joint Force Air Component Commander.	

=== Medal (OAM) ===
==== General Division ====
Recipient	Citation	Notes
Elizabeth Ann Adnams	For service to youth through the Guiding movement.	
Phyllis May Andersson	For service to athletics as an official and administrator.	
Dr Dorothy Joan Angell	For service to nursing, and to the community.	
Vernon Brent Armstrong	For service to the community of Hobart through local government.	
Ruth Beverley Arnold	For service to water safety as an instructor, and to the community of Wellington.	
Janice Enid Atkins	For service to the community of Deloraine.	
Victor Graham Barker	For service to the community as a supporter of a range of charitable and social welfare organisations.	
Mavis Barnes	For service to the community of Kendall.	
Roland John Bartlett	For service to the restoration and preservation of Murray River paddle steamers, and to the community of Goolwa.	
Christopher David Bearman	For service to the community as a contributor to the development of music education and performance in the Central Coast region.	
Jeffrey James Bendall	For service to the community through a range of programs supporting youth.	
Linda Williamstown Bergin	For service to the protection and preservation of the environment, particularly heritage sites on the Sydney Harbour foreshore.	
Malcolm John Bergmann	For service to tennis through administrative roles.	
Stephen Russell Bernard	For service to cricket as a player and selector and as Manager of the Australian Men's Team.	
Evan Charles Best	For service to the study of family history, particularly through the Society of Australian Genealogists	
Anthony John Bleasdale	For service to the community as a supporter of charitable organisations, and to local government in the Blacktown area.	
Kevin James Bockmann	For service to public sector administration, and through volunteer roles with medical, historical and sporting organisations.	
Michael Shayne Bohl	For service to swimming as a competitor and coach.	
Michael Paul Braybrooks	For service to the community of Cootamundra, and to local government.	
Nancy Joy Brazier	For service to youth, particularly through the Guiding movement in Western Australia.	
Emeritus Professor Robert James Breakspere	For service to science and technology as an academic and researcher.	
Dr Fabio Robert Brecciaroli	For service to medicine, particularly through the provision of palliative care services, and to the community of the Sunshine Coast.	
George Ernest Brennan	For service to youth through the Scouting movement.	
Dr Philomena Susanne Brennan	For service to music education.	
Larry James Brennen	For service to the dairy industry in Western Australia.	
Dr Edward William Brentall MBE	For service to acute and emergency medicine, particularly through the development of innovative procedures.	
Adeline Ruth (Del) Brooke	For service to the community through a range of voluntary organisations, and to the Tamworth Historical Society and the VIEW Club.	
Bladen James Brooke	For service to the community of Tamworth, and to the New England Film and Sound Archive.	
Roslyn Eileen Bryan	For service to the welfare of veterans and their families, particularly through the Fish Creek Sub-Branch of the Returned and Services League of Australia.	
Rosemary Margaret Budavari	For service to the law through the advancement of human rights and through the Women's Legal Centre of the Australian Capital Territory.	
Susan Irene Buffery	For service to the community through the Bone Marrow Transplant Program at the Royal Perth Hospital.	
Bruce Edward Bunn	For service to the community of Camden through a range of service and church organisations.	
Michael Anthony Burge	For service to psychology, and to the community through the development of training and treatment protocols for trauma.	
Donald William Burke	For service to conservation and the environment through advisory roles, to the horticultural industry, and to the media as a television presenter.	
Joan Felicia Burlew	For service to the community through voluntary roles with church, health care and service organisations.	
Leslie William Bursill	For service to the community of the Sutherland Shire through a range of heritage, arts and historical organisations.	
Sue Ann Byatt	For service to people with disabilities, particularly through the establishment of arts programs for children and adults.	
Elizabeth Ann Byrne	For service to people with mental and physical disabilities and to their carers through the provision of support and respite care facilities.	
Dr John William Cairns	For service to palliative medicine, and to the community of the Townsville region.	
Associate Professor Joseph Canalese	For service to medicine, to rural health, and to the community of Dubbo.	
John William Cannings	For service to the community through volunteer and advisory roles with youth, social welfare and veterans organisations.	
Leslie John Carlisle	For service to the community through the study and documentation of Australian coins, medals, tokens and memorabilia.	
John Carter	For service to the community, particularly through the No 8 Elementary Flying Training School Association.	
Douglas "Doug" Charles Caulfield RFD	For service to the community of Gippsland through a range of ex-service, sporting and local government organisations.	
Anne Celan	For service to the Indigenous community of the Northern Territory, and to animal welfare in rural and remote areas.	
Frank Chahoud	For service to the community of the Canterbury-Bankstown area, and to church and social welfare organisations.	
Millicent Anne Chalmers	For service to the community of the Millers Point area of Sydney, and to aged persons.	
Stuart Chalmers	For service to the community, particularly through the Stroke Recovery Association of New South Wales, and to the Caves Beach Surf Life Saving Club.	
Patricia Anne Cleveland	For service to the arts in Tasmania through industry development and roles supporting emerging artists.	
Esma Evelyn Cochrane	For service to the community, particularly through the Country Women's Association.	
Dr Geoffrey Stephen Cohn	For service to ophthalmology, and to overseas aid programs fostering improved eye-health services.	
Raymond "Ray" Collins	For service to the community of Quirindi, particularly through the Wallabadah First Fleet Memorial Gardens.	
James Foster Cook	For service to the local government sector, and to the community of Morowa.	
Jane Mary Cook	For service to the community through Operation Christmas Child.	
Paul Melvyn Cook	For service to the aged care industry, and to health services management.	
Dorothy May Cosandey	For service to people with a disability through voluntary roles with the Teralba Association, and to the community of Mapleton.	
Eric James Cox	For service to animal science through the management of projects at the Beatrice Hill Research Farm, and to the community.	
Colin Raleigh Croll	For service to the community through the Neutral Bay Chamber of Commerce, and to Rotary.	
Jenny Cross	For service to the community as a foster carer of babies and children with special needs.	
Robert Melville Cross	For service to the community as a foster carer of babies and children with special needs.	
Audrey Myrtle Cummins	For service to the community as a church organist and musical director.	
George Davidson	For service to the community of the Tweed Shire through a range of local government, sporting and veterans organisations.	
Edward William Davies AFSM	For service to the community of Wilcannia through a range of local government, farming and services organisations.	
Roy William Davies	For service to veterans through the Bermagui Sub-Branch of the Returned and Services League of Australia.	
The Reverend Father Kevin Donal Davine	For service to education, and to the Catholic Church in Victoria.	
Charles Hunter Davis	For service to international relations, particularly as a rural development adviser in Cambodia.	
Dorothy Mary De Low	For service to table tennis.	
Janice Patricia Dent	For service to nursing, and to the development of national professional practice standards.	
Peter Jan Elberg	For service to the community through support for a range of charitable organisations.	
Susan Joan Elder	For service to the community through the design and development of a therapeutic portable cooling system, and to nursing.	
Hani Elturk	For service to the media as a journalist, and to the Arabic speaking community.	
Shula Endrey-Walder	For service to the community through raising awareness of Tay–Sachs disease and as the co-founder of Gift of Life Australia.	
Vicki Maree Etherington	For service to the community, particularly through the Royal New South Wales Canine Council.	
Geoffrey John Evans	For service to the veteran community of north Queensland.	
Benjamin Newman Fink	For service to engineering and to the development of professional standards.	
Emilio Mario Fiorenza	For service to the Italian community of Victoria.	
DrEdward Murdoch Fisher	For service to veterinary science, and to the community of Gympie.	
Allan Thomas Fletcher	For service to veterans, and to the community of the Central Coast.	
Deirdre Elleen Flint	For service to the community of the Central Highlands, and to the local government sector in Tasmania.	
John Clement Fordham	For service to media, sports and entertainment management, to wine journalism, and to the community.	
Douglas William Fox	For service to golf and lacrosse as an administrator.	
Dr John Peterie Fricker	For service to dentistry, particularly through executive roles with professional organisations.	
Geoffrey Alan Fry	For service to music, particularly through band organisations.	
Dr John Arthur Fuller	For service to medicine, particularly in the treatment of coronary artery disease.	
William Joseph Galvin†	For service to the community as a volunteer and fundraiser for a range of charitable organisations.	
Aleksander Marlan Gancarz	For service to the Polish community in Australia, and to Rotary.	
Roy David "Peter" Garland	For service to the community of Armidale, and to lawn bowls.	
Doreen Martha Gaskell	For service to the community of Newtown, particularly through the St Vincent de Paul Society.	
Dawn McBride Geyer	For service to the community through contributions to the Woodlands Church of England Girls Grammar School.	
Betty Noelene Ghent	For service to people with a visual impairment through Retina Australia.	
David Andrew Gibson	For service to the community through a range of heritage, preservation and historical organisations.	
Ronald William Gibson	For service to the community of the Sutherland Shire.	
Anthony George Giles-Peters	For service to people with a physical disability, particularly through the Australian Ventilator Users Network.	
Grahame John Gooding	For service to veterans, particularly through Legacy, and to the community.	
Dr Vicki Gordon	For service to the community of Victoria through roles with a range of Jewish organisations.	
Suzanne Goss	For service to children as a foster carer, and to the community.	
Terrence John Gough	For service to the arts in Tasmania, and to education as a teacher.	
Raymond John Greig	For service to the community through St John Ambulance Australia.	
Raymond Henry Griffiths	For service to the community, particularly through the Royal Far West Children's Health Scheme.	
Sister Anthea Mary Groves	For service to nursing, and to St Vincent's Hospital, Darlinghurst.	
Indrani Leelamani Gunaratnam	For service to the community of the Northern Territory through a range of social welfare, arts and sporting organisations.	
Ken "Karim" Habak	For service to multicultural communities in the Illawarra region.	
Verlene "Joy" Haberfield	For service to the community through the Parramatta Division Widows' Club of Sydney Legacy.	
Noel Frank Hall	For service to youth through the Scouting movement, and to the community.	
Brian William Hamill	For service to the community of the Murwillumbah region, particularly through Rotary.	
Elizabeth Gae "Betty" Hamil	For service to the community of the Murwillumbah region through a range of social welfare and service organisations.	
William Charles Hamilton	For service to youth through the Stewart House Preventorium, and to the community.	
Norman Lloyd Hammon	For service to the sport of sailing, particularly through the International Fireball Association, and to the community.	
Dr Timothy Duncan Hannah	For service to medicine as a general practitioner in the Katherine region.	
Dr David Ian Harding	For service to the community, particularly through the Griffith Show Society.	
June Lorraine Harrison	For service to youth through the Scouting movement, and to the community.	
Ian John Heads	For service to the media as a sports journalist, author and mentor.	
John Robin Hector	For service to veterans and their families through the Returned and Services League of Australia, and to the community.	
Barbara Mary Heine	For service to the community through the Riding for the Disabled Association, and to children and their families.	
Alan Ewart Henderson	For service to the community of Rutherglen.	
Karl Walter Hertle	For service to children through Life Education Queensland, and to the community.	
Rodney Samuel Hill	For service to veterans and their families through the Returned and Services League of Australia, and to the community of Broome.	
Raymond Thomas Hille	For service to education as Principal of The Peninsula School, and to professional organisations.	
Robert Ennis Hocking	For service to the community of the Mildura region through a range of organisations.	
Trevor Victor Hohns	For service to cricket as a selector and player.	
Dr Ian James Hopkins	For service to medicine as a paediatric neurologist and through professional organisations.	
Joseph Anthony Hopkins	For service to the community through the provision of voluntary musical programs.	
Dr Terence Joseph Horgan RFD	For service to the community as a fundraiser for Catholic charitable organisations.	
Robert James Howard	For service to surf lifesaving in Western Australia.	
Joan Howlett	For service to the community of Coffs Harbour, and to youth through the Guiding movement.	
Thomas Henry "Tom" Iceton	For service to cricket in New South Wales.	
Norma May Irwin	For service to veterans and their families in the Nowra region.	
Kevin Victor Jaeschke	For service to soil conservation and the environment, and to the community.	
Keith Edward Jameson	For service to the sport of rowing in New South Wales.	
George James Jamieson†	For service to ballroom dancing, and to the community.	
Dorlene Joyce "Lyn" Johnson	For service to aged welfare, and to the community of Narrabeen.	
Squadron Leader Gordon Hubert Johnstone (Retired)	For service to veterans and cadets, particularly through the Maritime Squadrons Association and the Royal Australian Air Force Association.	
Esme Josephine Jome	For service to the community of Castlemaine, particularly through the Australian Red Cross.	
Constance "Barbara" Jones	For service to aged welfare through Baptist Community Services.	
Kevin William Jones	For service to the community through a range of sporting, agricultural and veterans organisations.	
Martinus Maria Jonkers	For service to the Dutch community of Queensland, to aged care, and to Rotary.	
Maureen Ann Kelly	For service to the community of North Arm Cove.	
Robyn June Kendall	For service to children as a foster carer.	
Dr Christopher John Kennedy	For service to medical administration and medical education in north Queensland.	
Kelvin Kerkow	For service to lawn bowls as a player, coach and mentor of junior bowlers.	
Associate Professor Denis Warwick King	For service to medicine, particularly in the field of colorectal surgery, to medical education and to professional organisations.	
Russell James Kingston	For service to aviculture in Queensland.	
William "Bruce" Kirkpatrick	For service to the community, particularly through the Meniere's Research Fund.	
John Cuthel Kosten	For service to the community through the surf lifesaving movement.	
Robin Hazel Lawrence	For service to the arts through the establishment of the Glebe Art Prize and as an artist.	
John Gaskell Leake†	For service to the arts as an historian with the Australian Cinematographers Society.	
Barbara Miriam Lees-Margiotta	For service to the community of Mount Gambier.	
Dr Keith Jacob Lipshut	For service to the community of Wangaratta, and as a general practitioner.	
Dr Kamalini Maya Lokuge	For service to humanitarian aid through the International Committee of the Red Cross and Médecins Sans Frontières.	
Simon Dorio Loscheiavo	For service to sport for people with a disability, particularly skiing.	
Donald Lowe	For service to the community through the Rathmines Catalina Memorial Park Trust.	
Ralph Willett Lucas	For service to horseracing, particularly in New South Wales.	
James Anthony Lupton	For service to Rugby League football, and to the community of the Tamworth district.	
Sister Margaret "Carmel" McFaull	For service to the community through the Southern Peninsula Cancer Support Group.	
Alison "Margaret" McGregor	For service to the community through support for, and resettlement of, refugees from Afghanistan and Iran.	
Dr John Douglas McKee	For service to the community of Bega, to medicine, and to Rotary.	
William Leonard McLean	For service to education through the Northern Territory Training Authority, and to the community.	
Laurence Joseph Maher	For service to the community of Gosford through social welfare and local government organisations.	
Pamela Rosemary Mamouney	For service to the community, particularly through the Casey Multi-Faith Network, and to the Greater Dandenong area.	
Sydney Arnold Margetts	For service to veterans through the British Commonwealth Occupation Forces Sub-Branch of the Returned and Services League of Australia.	
Dr Karin Ann Margolius	For service to clinical forensic medicine, to education, and through support for people with cancer.	
Geoffrey Allan Martin	For service to athletics, and to surf lifesaving.	
Kathryn Gaye Massey	For service to the Indigenous community of Groote Eylandt.	
Norman "Bryan" Massey	For service to the Indigenous community of Groote Eylandt.	
Dr Bruce Graham Menzies	For service to the arts in the Armidale region, particularly music, and as a general practitioner.	
Beverley Rose Mirolo	For service to the community, particularly through the Leukemia Foundation of Queensland.	
Dudley Barr Mitchell	For service to veterans through the Royal Australian Air Force Association.	
Arthur Clive Mitchell-Taylor	For service to Vietnam veterans, and to the community.	
Giacomo "Jack" Monti	For service to the hospitality industry.	
Betty Moore	For service to the community of Inverell through a range of health, service and local government organisations.	
Jenny Patricia Morris	For service to the arts, particularly music, and to the community through charitable organisations.	
Robert Arthur Mouatt	For service to orienteering.	
Wendy Jeanne Muddell	For service to the historic vehicle movement, and to the Australian Motorlife Museum.	
Dr Julian Charles Mullins MBE	For service to veterinary science, and to the community of Kingaroy.	
Michael John Mummery	For service to the community through veterans organisations.	
William Joseph Needham	For service to the community of the Goulburn region, particularly through the education and preservation of military history.	
Denise Lorel Nichols	For service to humanitarian aid, particularly through programs assisting women and refugees.	
Majorie Lrae Norris	For service to the community of the Douglas Shire through aged care, health, local government and arts organisations.	
Yvonne Alisa Nurnberger	For service to the community of Mackay, particularly through the Leukemia Foundation of Queensland and the Make-A-Wish Foundation.	
Rita Mary O'Brien	For service to the community of Colac and the surrounding region.	
Robyn Christine O'Bryen	For service to the community, particularly to children as a foster carer.	
Barry Thomas O'Callaghan	For service to surveying through professional associations, and to the community.	
Ross Allan O'Connor	For service to veterans and their families through the Western Australian Branch of the Returned and Services League of Australia.	
John Graham O'Neill	For service to the community through a range of youth and service organisations, and to Technical Aid to the Disabled ACT.	
Frances Jean Orford	For service to education, and to the community through language programs assisting migrants and refugees.	
Edward John O'Sullivan ED	For service to veterans and their families through the City of Parramatta Sub-Branch of the Returned and Services League of Australia.	
Evlynne Maye Otto	For service to the community, particularly through Novita Children's Services.	
Lesley Gertrude Ould	For service to the community of Laverton.	
Ekrem Ozyurek	For service to the Turkish community of Victoria, and to education.	
Janet Mary Paisley	For service to the community, particularly through the Geelong Regional Auxiliary for Chaplaincy and Christian Religious Education.	
Leonard "Len" Palmer	For service to veterans and their families through the South Hurstville Sub-Branch of the Returned and Services League of Australia.	
Stephen Charles Paul	For service to education as a contributor to the development and implementation of technology in schools.	
Graeme Charles Pearson	For service to the community through a range of charitable organisations.	
Shirley Anne Politzer	For service to the community, particularly through the Sydney Jewish community and the Scouting movement.	
Kim Petrina Polley	For service to the community of Northern Midlands, and to the local government sector.	
Charles Warwick Pope	For service to the industry of Non-Destructive Testing.	
Simon Crealock Price	For service to the community through the Malvern Elderly Citizens Welfare Association, and to Rotary.	
Phillip James Prosser	For service to the Indigenous community of Western Australia.	
Dawn Elaine Prowse	For service to the community, particularly through learn to swim programs.	
Alec Herbert Purves	For service to the aquaculture industry in Tasmania.	
Lynette Dawn Quinn	For service to netball through administrative roles.	
Stephen Arnold Radford	For service to the community of Broken Hill.	
Barry Kenneth Raymond	For service to the community, particularly through Lifeline Central Coast.	
Kathleen Constance Readford	For service to people with dementia and to their carers.	
David Stephen Richards	For service to the community, particularly through the Eaglehawk Dahlia Arts Festival.	
Donald Knowles Richardson	For service to the arts, particularly through Artist's Voice and the Hahndorf Academy, and to the community of Mount Barker.	
Erwin Arthur Richter	For service to the community of Wagga Wagga, particularly through support for migrants and refugees.	
Shirley Ann Robertson	For service to the community, particularly through the Benalla Hospital Auxiliary.	
Charles Stewart Ross	For service to the community, particularly through the Upper Murray Historical Society.	
Barry Rubie	For service to the community through the Asthma Foundation of Western Australia.	
Terrence Vincent Sanders	For service to the community of Warracknabeal.	
Pastor Susan Margaret Scarcella	For service to overseas humanitarian aid projects, particularly through the Protestant Christian Church, Bali.	
Irene Florence Schaffer	For service to the community of Tasmania as a volunteer genealogist and family historian.	
Lyall Grant Schultz ESM	For service to the community, and to the fodder industry through executive roles.	
Harry Robert Scroop	For service to the McLaren Vale community through a range of service, sporting, and aged care organisations.	
Eunice "Joan" Shears	For service to the promotion of peace, nuclear disarmament and social justice issues.	
Joseph Pawal Schneider	For service to the automotive industry, particularly in the areas of training and education.	
Professor Andrew Damien Short	For service to science in the area of coastal studies, and to the Australian Beach Safety and Management Program.	
Miroslawa Siejka	For service to the Polish community of northern Tasmania.	
John Anthony Silk	For service to people living with Parkinson's disease through administrative and support roles.	
Jennifer Anne Simons	For service to conservation and the environment in the Southern Highlands region.	
Pamela May Slocum	For service to the community of Canberra, particularly youth through fundraising and support roles.	
Kenneth Hayden Smith	For service to the community through the Parramatta and District Historical Society and through Museums and Galleries New South Wales.	
Margaret Janet Smith	For service to the community through Canberra Legacy.	
John David Smyth	For service to conservation and the environment through sustainable farming practices in combination with flora and fauna conservation.	
Rex Donald Solomon	For service to youth through the Scouting movement, and to the community of Taree.	
Anthony Leonard Sonneveld	For service to the industry of Non-Destructive Testing, and to the community.	
Gladys Pearl Springfield	For service to the community through Quota International.	
Alfred Stein	For service to the arts, particularly through the Australian Friends of the Israel Philharmonic Orchestra.	
Dorrit Codelia Stevens	For service to the community through voluntary roles with the Heart Foundation of South Australia.	
Joyce Allison Stewart	For service to the community of Queenscliff through the promotion of local history and heritage.	
John Alexander Stinson	For service to the arts, particularly in the field of medieval music.	
John William Stir	For service to science education in Queensland.	
Anthony John Sukari	For service to multiculturalism, and to the community through a range of cultural organisations.	
Gloria Irene Swift	For service to nursing, and to the Illawarra Breast Cancer Support Group.	
James Donald "Jim" Taggart	For service to the community of Baulkham Hills through a range of service, charitable and sporting organisations.	
Alan Richard Taylor	For service to accountancy, and to the community, particularly through the St Vincent de Paul Society in Queensland.	
Malcolm Theo Taylor	For service to the community of Logan, particularly through Neighbourhood Watch	
Alexander Teeney	For service to the community, particularly through the Mount Morgan Rotary Club.	
Steve Tharenou	For service to education, particularly as Principal of the MacGregor Primary School.	
Ronald Charles Thatcher	For service to the international community through programs to assist children and communities in Indonesia and Thailand, and to the Rotary Club of Armadale-Neerigen Brook.	
Dr Peter Papworth Thomas	For service to emergency medicine in Queensland, and to a range of professional associations.	
Alison Thompson	For service to humanitarian aid, particularly the people of the Peraliya region of Sri Lanka following the Boxing Day 2004 Tsunami.	
Alexander Charles Topp	For service to veterans and their families through the Returned and Services League of Australia.	
Leonard "George" Tucker	For service to rural medicine as a consultant physician and educator.	
John Utting	For service to the community of Cottesloe through local government, sporting and service organisations.	
Giovanni "John" Vassallo	For service to the Italian community of South Australia.	
Ronald Charles Virgen	For service to the welfare of veterans and their families through the Banyo Sub-Branch of the Returned and Services League of Australia, and to youth.	
Dr Ivan Milton Vodanovich	For service to the law through the reform of the Criminal Justice system in Western Australia, particularly in the area of probation and parole.	
Gordon Wade	For service to the welfare of veterans and their families through the Goulburn Sub-Branch of the Returned and Services League of Australia, and to Legacy.	
Graeme Hamlyn Wallace	For service to the community of Manningham.	
Dennis Robin Walter	For service to the sailing community of South Australia.	
Jennifer Hertford Wanless	For service to science through voluntary roles with Questacon, and to the Nature and Society Forum.	
Dr Helen Mary Watchirs	For service to the advancement of human rights, particularly as the Human Rights and Discrimination Commissioner of the Australian Capital Territory.	
Joyce Alyson Wearn	For service to the community of the Yorke Peninsula through a range of service, sporting and religious organisations.	
Joan Katherine Webster	For service to the community through raising awareness of bushfire safety.	
William Malcolm Wedd	For service to the community of Glenorchy through service, education and charitable organisations, and to local government.	
Richard Gilbert Weigall	For service to children and adults with learning disabilities, particularly through the development of special education programs, techniques and materials.	
John Carlyle Wells	For service to veterans, to education as a school Principal, and to the community of Dandenong.	
Margaret Helen White	For service to children with special needs through the Ladies of Variety.	
Stephen Widmer	For service to swimming as a coach, particularly through the Queensland Academy of Sport.	
Maurice John Wilhelm	For service to the environment, and to the community of Murray Bridge through local government, service and church organisations.	
Winsome Dawn Willow	For service to the community through programs assisting women and children in crisis, and to the ACT Mental Health Community Coalition.	
Cecil Frederick Wilson	For service to the community through the Kiwanis Club of Adelaide and the Uganda Australia Outreach Program.	
John Arthur Wilson	For service to veterans and their families through the Wide Bay and Burnett District Branch and Bundaberg Sub-Branch of the Returned and Services League of Australia.	
George Barrie Windsor	For service to education, and to the community through cultural and religious organisations.	
John Woodfield	For service to the community through the Horticultural Society of Canberra.	
Christopher John Wright	For service to the environment, particularly through monitoring projects in the Gammon Ranges of South Australia.	
Peter Edward Zander	For service to the community through Kiwanis International.	
Kaylynn "Kaye" Zaro	For service to the promotion and teaching of Torres Strait Islander culture, particularly through the Gerib Sik dance group.	
Noel Joseph Zaro	For service to the promotion and teaching of Torres Strait Islander culture, particularly through the Gerib Sik dance group.	

==== Military Division ====
Branch	Recipient	Citation	Notes
Navy	Chief Petty Officer Kelvin Harris	For meritorious service to the Anzac Class ships and as the Chief Petty Officer in charge of Propulsion Systems onboard HMAS Toowoomba.	
Navy	Commander Michael Dermot Macneil RAN	For meritorious service to the Royal Australian Navy in the field of Simulation and Systems Support and Development, HMAS Watson, Commanding Officer of the Australian Joint Acoustic Analysis Centre and as Director of the Air Warfare System Centre, HMAS Albatross.	
Navy	Warrant Officer Brendan Andrew Woodsell	For meritorious service in the field of Combat Systems and as an outstanding warrant officer in the Royal Australian Navy.	
Army	Corporal Michael Anthony Cole	For meritorious service as the Senior Combat Engineer Mentor for the 4th Kandak Battalion, Afghan National Army in Mentoring and Reconstruction Task Force 1 in Uruzgan Province.	
Army	Major Ruth Margaret Hayes	For meritorious service as the Employment Category Process Manager, Army Logistic Training Centre and for service to the Australian Army Catering Corps.	
Army	Warrant Officer Class One Raymond John Holtze	For meritorious service as the Unit Sergeant Major while employed at the Defence National Storage and Distribution Centre.	
Army	Warrant Officer Class One Craig Thomas Howe	For meritorious service as the Regimental Sergeant Major of the 10th/27th Battalion, The Royal South Australia Regiment from 2006 to 2007 and the 5th Battalion, The Royal Australian Regiment from 2008 to 2009.	
Army	Warrant Officer Class One Peter George Marsh	For meritorious service as the Regimental Sergeant Major of the 9th Battalion, The Royal Queensland Regiment from 2005 to 2006 and the 1st Battalion, The Royal Australian Regiment from 2007 to 2008.	
Army	Warrant Officer Class One David Anthony "Tony" Quirk	For meritorious service as the Regimental Sergeant Major of the 1st Combat Engineer Regiment, Squadron Sergeant Major of the 21st Construction Squadron and Engineer Task Group, 2nd Reconstruction Task Force, and as Career Manager Royal Australian Engineers.	
Air Force	Group Captain Alan David Holtfreter CSC	For meritorious service in the field of Military Air Traffic Control capability.	
Air Force	Warrant Officer Kevin Patrick Leahy	For meritorious service to the Royal Australian Air Force in the field of ground engineering.	
Air Force	Warrant Officer Anthony James Lock	For meritorious service in the field of aircraft maintenance and in establishing revised Royal Australian Air Force maintenance governance requirements.	

== Meritorious Service ==
=== Public Service Medal (PSM) ===
Public Service Medal ribbon

State/ Territory	Recipient	Citation	Notes
Fed.	Jonathan Robbie "Rob" Bray	For outstanding public service as a policy analyst and as a researcher, particularly in the areas of poverty and inequality.	
Fed.	Keith Alexander Byles	For outstanding public service as a legislative drafter, particularly the legislation to implement the Carbon Pollution Reduction Scheme and telecommunications and broadcasting reform.	
Fed.	Dr Michael Joseph Collins	For outstanding public service in the field of forensic science, particularly in the development of an international drug profiling program.	
Fed.	James Edgar Duffy	For outstanding public service in leading the Australian Crime Commission's operations in relation to serious and organised crime.	
Fed.	Carolyn Hogg	For outstanding public service in leading significant improvements in the quality, effectiveness and efficiency of Centrelink's service delivery and customer support.	
Fed.	Dr James Bruce Horne	For outstanding public service in the area of water policy, use and management in Australia.	
Fed.	Arja Sinikka Keski-Nummi	For outstanding public service in the development and delivery of Australia's humanitarian migration policies and programs.	
Fed.	Lyndall Jane Sachs	For outstanding public service as Australia's Ambassador to Lebanon, particularly her leadership role in the evacuation of Australian citizens during the recent conflict between Lebanon and Israel.	
Fed.	Kevin Douglas Slade	For outstanding public service in the fields of hydrographic charting and nautical information.	
Fed.	Brian Robert Stacey	For outstanding public service in the area of programs and services for Indigenous Australians.	
Fed.	Jody Louise Swirepik	For outstanding public service in driving the Murray-Darling Basin Authority's Living Murray initiative.	
Fed.	Kerrie Maree Westcott	For outstanding public service in the development and implementation of the Indigenous Communications Program.	
NSW	Leonard William Banks	For outstanding public service to agricultural research, the environment and climate change.	
NSW	Guy Stewart Cooper	For outstanding public service to the Taronga Conservation Society Australia.	
NSW	Gary William Corben	For outstanding public service to Australia Post, the Roads and Traffic Authority of NSW and the NSW Police Force.	
NSW	Linda Franklin	For outstanding public service to the World Youth Day Coordination Authority in support of World Youth Day 2008.	
NSW	Phillip Peter Hahn	For outstanding public service to the National Parks and Wildlife Services.	
NSW	Michael Walter Harkins MVO	For outstanding public service to the Community Engagement and Events Division of the NSW Department of Premier and Cabinet.	
NSW	Dr Surrey Jacobs†	For outstanding public service in the research of the systematics of grasses, water plants and salt bushes growing in Australia.	
NSW	Helen Scott-Orr	For outstanding public service to agricultural and veterinary science, particularly in the area of animal disease control.	
NSW	Mary Steward	For outstanding public service to WorkCover NSW in the Albury region.	
NSW	Pieter Van Breda	For outstanding public service to Sydney Water.	
VIC	Robert Ross Klemm	For outstanding public service as an educator and mentor, particularly to young people with a disability, providing them with the opportunity to play their game of choice as a valued and respected member of a sporting team.	
VIC	Peter Richard Lake	For outstanding public service in developing and improving Victoria's response to people who are homeless or experiencing family violence.	
VIC	Dr Hugh Warwick Millar	For outstanding public service to the general public and livestock industries as Chief Veterinary Officer, Victoria.	
VIC	Bruce Ronald Quinn	For outstanding public service in the conservation, welfare and recovery of the Helmeted Honeyeater – Victoria's avian emblem.	
VIC	Raymond William Tonkin	For outstanding public service to the recognition, management and promotion of Victoria's non-Indigenous cultural heritage.	
QLD	Barry William Ball	For outstanding public service, particularly in the south east Queensland region, in the area of water policy, management and reform.	
QLD	Professor Ernest Martin Hunter	For outstanding public service to Queensland Health, particularly in the delivery of mental health initiatives in rural Queensland.	
QLD	Laurel Francis Leinster	For outstanding public service to Queensland education through commitment and leadership as Deputy Principal of Mareeba State School.	
QLD	Elizabeth Anne-Marie Mackie	For outstanding public service to Queensland education, particularly in the community of Aurukun, through leadership and innovation as Principal of Aurukun Campus Western Cape College.	
QLD	Dr John James Patten	For outstanding public service to Queensland Health in the development of sexual health medicine in Queensland.	
QLD	Christopher Charles Rose	For outstanding public service, particularly to the community of Logan, as Chief Executive Officer of Logan City Council.	
WA	Susan Jane Hunt	For outstanding public service as the Chief Executive Officer of the Perth Zoological Parks Authority.	
WA	Colin Peter Murphy	For outstanding public service at senior levels in the financial and business services areas of the Western Australian Government.	
WA	Wayne Gordon Schmidt	For outstanding public service within the Parks and Visitor Services Division of Western Australia's Department of Environment and Conservation.	
SA	Phillipa Walpole Dugan	For outstanding public service in the area of education and social inclusion within South Australia.	
SA	David John Maschmedt	For outstanding public service in the area of land resource assessment and land evaluation within South Australia.	
SA	Dr Donald James Plowman	For outstanding public service in the area of sustainable agricultural development.	
ACT	Susanne Elizabeth Burns	For outstanding public service to children's welfare within the Australian Capital Territory.	
ACT	Neil Kevin Cooper	For outstanding public service to the development of improved fire management programs within the Australian Capital Territory.	
NT	Julie Ann Nicholson	For outstanding public service to the machinery of government in the Northern Territory.	

=== Australian Police Medal (APM) ===
Australian Police Medal ribbon

Branch	Recipient	Notes
Australian Federal Police	Superintendent Marzio De Re	
Australian Federal Police	Assistant Commissioner Timothy Morris AM	
New South Wales Police Force	Detective Sergeant John Michael Burns	
New South Wales Police Force	Detective Inspector Dennis John Clarke	
New South Wales Police Force	Sergeant David William Gallagher	
New South Wales Police Force	Sergeant Stewart Andrew Lockerey	
New South Wales Police Force	Detective Superintendent Peter Gerard McErlain	
New South Wales Police Force	Detective Inspector Ian Eric McNab	
New South Wales Police Force	Inspector Phillip Thomas O'Reilly	
New South Wales Police Force	Superintendent Dennis Leslie Watson	
Victoria Police	Senior Sergeant Vin Butera	
Victoria Police	Assistant Commissioner Thomas Donald Luke Cornelius	
Victoria Police	Superintendent Stephen Craig Gleeson	
Victoria Police	Inspector Gregory Stewart Hough OAM	
Victoria Police	Superintendent Christopher Andrew O'Neill	
Victoria Police	Inspector Dennis Leslie Watson	
Queensland Police Service	Sergeant Gregory Neville Benfer	
Queensland Police Service	Superintendent Rowan Thomas Bond	
Queensland Police Service	Superintendent Alistair Ewen Dawson	
Queensland Police Service	Chief Superintendent Stephan William Gollschewski	
Queensland Police Service	Superintendent James Patrick Keogh	
Queensland Police Service	Senior Sergeant Charysse Adele Pond	
Western Australia Police	Superintendent Gary John Budge	
Western Australia Police	Detective Superintendent Graeme Maxwell Castlehow	
Western Australia Police	Superintendent Haydn Reginald Green	
South Australia Police	Senior Sergeant Cheryl Marie Brown	
South Australia Police	Rodney Ian Malkin	
South Australia Police	Assistant Commissioner Neil Severn Smith	
Tasmania Police	Sergeant Patrick George McMahon	
Tasmania Police	Senior Constable Stephen Charles Timmins SC	
Northern Territory	Detective Sergeant Wendy Schultz	
Northern Territory	Sergeant Shane Michael Taylor	

=== Australian Fire Service Medal (AFSM) ===
Australian Fire Service Medal ribbon

Branch	Recipient	Notes
NSW	Marcus Gilbert Baker	
NSW	Angelo John Baldo	
NSW	Colin Edward Dowling	
NSW	Gregory John Green	
NSW	Robert John Hawkins	
NSW	Lance Edward Howley	
NSW	Richard James Parish	
NSW	Steven Jon Pearce	
NSW	Neville David Roberts	
NSW	Ian Alexander Smith	
VIC	David Robert Allen	
VIC	Andrew John Cusack	
VIC	Phillip John De La Haye	
VIC	Roger Eric Edwards	
VIC	Stephen Patrick O'Malley	
VIC	Robert Matthew Smith	
VIC	Maxwell Albert "Max" Stuart	
VIC	Andrew John Zammit	
QLD	Alistair David Alexander	
WA	Stephen Roy Foureur	
WA	Terrence Howard "Terry" Jackson	
WA	Donald Sydney Johnston	
WA	Antonio John "Nino" Messina	
WA	Charles Carmelo Messina	
SA	David Thomas Pearce	
SA	David Arthur Schmerl	
SA	Gerold Seppelt	
TAS	Graham Ronald Bennell	
TAS	Andrew Charles Comer	
TAS	John Tyrrell	

=== Ambulance Service Medal (ASM) ===
Ambulance Service Medal ribbon

Branch	Recipient	Notes
NSW	Denis Alan Beavan	
NSW	Phillip James Good	
NSW	Jeffrey William Hescott	
NSW	Garry Kenneth Sinclair	
NSW	Paul William Stewart	
NSW	James Edwin Vernon	
VIC	William James Burger	
VIC	Michael William Cameron	
VIC	Victor Lee Dunell	
VIC	Jennifer Elizabeth Geer	
VIC	Tanya Elizabeth Sullivan	
QLD	Lucinda Clarke	
QLD	Gary Gordon Giles	
WA	Desmond Louis Callaghan	
WA	Paul Markus Gray	
WA	Jill Grist	
SA	Martin Paul Kimber	
SA	Anthony Ross "Tony" Vaughan	
TAS	Brian Wayne Knowles	
TAS	Catherine Sarah McNamara	
TAS	Cheryl Irene Wilson	

=== Emergency Service Medal (ESM) ===
Emergency Services Medal ribbon

Branch	Recipient	Notes
NSW	John Richard Boyd	
NSW	Peter James Campton	
NSW	Dianne Ruth Gordon	
NSW	Kevin Michael Hill	
NSW	Peter Ronald Lalor	
NSW	Gregory Robert Slater†	
NSW	Jean Elizabeth Tyacke	
VIC	Andrew John Allan	
VIC	Mark Thomas Dodds	
QLD	Frank Mark Pagano AFSM	
SA	Brian Raymond Underwood	
TAS	Philip Leon Bird	
TAS	Michael Hansen Street	
ACT	Doreen Joan McEnroe	
NT	Joanne Killmister	

== Gallantry, Distinguished and Conspicuous Service ==
=== Star of Gallantry (SG) ===
Star of Gallantry ribbon

Branch	Recipient	Citation	Notes
Army	Private S	For acts of conspicuous gallantry in action in circumstances of great peril while a lead scout in Afghanistan in 2008.	

=== Medal for Gallantry (MG) ===
Medal for Gallantry ribbon

Branch	Recipient	Citation	Notes
Army	Private David William Cox	For gallantry in action in hazardous circumstances while a rifleman and combat first aider in Mentoring and Reconstruction Task Force 1 at Kakarak, Afghanistan on 16 March 2009.	
Army	Warrant Officer Class Two John Matthew "Matt" Lines	For gallantry in action in hazardous circumstances while acting as an Operational Mentoring and Liaison Team member at Kakarak, Afghanistan on 4 January 2009.	
Army	Corporal Giancarlos Brasil Taraborrelli	For gallantry in action in hazardous circumstances while an Operational Mentoring and Liaison Team member at Kakarak, Afghanistan on 16 March 2009.	

=== Distinguished Service Cross (DSC) ===
Distinguished Service Cross ribbon

Branch	Recipient	Citation	Notes
Army	Major G DSM	For distinguished command and leadership in action in Afghanistan in 2008.	
Army	Lieutenant Colonel Shane Leslie Gabriel	For distinguished command and leadership in action while Commanding Officer, Mentoring and Reconstruction Task Force 1 in Afghanistan from October 2008 to June 2009.	
Army	Major M	For distinguished command and leadership in action in Afghanistan in 2008.	
Army	Lieutenant Colonel P	For distinguished command and leadership in action in Afghanistan in 2008.	

=== Distinguished Service Medal (DSM) ===
Distinguished Service Medal ribbon

Branch	Recipient	Citation	Notes
Army	Sergeant D	For distinguished leadership in action as a patrol commander in Afghanistan in 2008.	
Army	Sergeant G	For distinguished leadership in action in Afghanistan in 2008.	
Army	Captain Paul William Graham	For distinguished leadership in action as Officer Commanding Operational Mentoring and Liaison Team 1 on Cemetery Hill West, Chora, Afghanistan between 23 and 25 November 2008.	
Army	Corporal Leon David Gray	For distinguished leadership in action while a section commander in 2 Platoon, Combat Team TUSK, Mentoring and Reconstruction Task Force 1, in action in the Chora Valley, Afghanistan on 29 December 2008.	
Army	Corporal J	For distinguished leadership in action as second-in-command of a patrol in Afghanistan in 2008.	
Army	Major J	For distinguished leadership in action as a troop commander in Afghanistan in 2008.	
Army	Lieutenant Jacob Alexander Kleinman	For distinguished leadership in action as Officer Commanding Operational Mentoring and Liaison Team 3 in Kakarak, Afghanistan on 16 and 18 March 2009.	
Army	Major David William McCammon	For distinguished leadership in action while Officer Commanding the Operational Mentoring and Liaison Team, Mentoring and Reconstruction Task Force 1 from October 2008 to June 2009.	
Army	Captain P	For distinguished leadership in action as a platoon commander in Afghanistan in 2008.	
Army	Captain T	For distinguished leadership in action as a platoon commander in Afghanistan in 2008.	
Army	Warrant Officer Class Two Adam John West	For distinguished leadership in action as a platoon mentor on Operation SLIPPER with Mentoring and Reconstruction Task Force 1 in southern Afghanistan.	

=== Commendation for Distinguished Service ===
Commendation for Distinguished Service ribbon

Branch	Recipient	Citation	Notes
Navy	Captain Michael Joseph Noonan RAN	For distinguished performance of duties in warlike operations as the Chief of Staff, Headquarters Joint Task Force 633, Middle East Area of Operations from September 2008 to March 2009.	
Navy	Commander	For distinguished performance of duties in warlike operations as the Commander of Task Group 633.1 and Commanding Officer, HMAS Parramatta, Middle East Area of Operations from August 2008 to January 2009.	
Army	Private A	For distinguished performance of duties in warlike operations in Afghanistan in 2008.	
Army	Warrant Officer Class Two Nathan Cole	For distinguished performance of duties in warlike operations as the Gun Line Section Commander, Royal Australian Artillery Troop and Second-in-Command, Kajaki Gun Troop in Afghanistan.	
Army	Lieutenant Colonel Andrew John Hocking	For distinguished performance of duties in warlike operations as the Lead Planner, Coalition Joint Plans Branch and as the Australian Senior National Representative on Headquarters International Security Assistance Force in Afghanistan.	
Army	Major J	For distinguished performance of duties in warlike operations in Afghanistan in 2008.	
Army	Corporal J	For distinguished performance of duties in warlike operations in Afghanistan in 2008.	
Army	Sergeant M	For distinguished performance of duties in warlike operations, in Afghanistan, 2008.	
Army	Warrant Officer Class Two M	For distinguished performance of duties in warlike operations, in Afghanistan, 2008.	
Army	Lance Corporal Jack Kade McEwan	For distinguished performance of duties in warlike operations while a sniper team leader in Mentoring and Reconstruction Task Force 1 in the Chora Valley, Afghanistan on the 23 November 2008.	
Army	Major Michael Lee Murdoch	For distinguished performance of duties in warlike operations while the Operations Officer, Reconstruction Task Force Rotation Four during Operation SLIPPER in Afghanistan.	
Army	Private Thomas Bao-Jin Price	For distinguished performance of duties in warlike operations as a combat first aider in a mass casualty situation in the south of the Baluchi Valley, Afghanistan on 12 January 2009.	
Army	Captain R	For distinguished performance of duties in warlike operations, in Afghanistan in 2008.	

=== Commendation for Gallantry ===
Commendation for Gallantry ribbon

Branch	Recipient	Citation	Notes
Army	Sergeant B	For gallantry in action as the commander of an explosive ordnance detachment in Afghanistan in 2008.	
Army	Corporal Bernard Ronald Ryan	For gallantry in action while an advanced medical technician in the Operational Mentoring and Liaison Team at Kwajeh Ahmed, Afghanistan on 24 March 2009.	
Army	Corporal Scott Philip Tampalini	For gallantry in action while an Operational Mentoring and Liaison Team member in Afghanistan at Chora 19 December 2008, Kakarak 16 March 2009 and Sorkh Morgarb 18 March 2009.	
Army	Corporal Nathan Fane Webb	For gallantry in action while a section commander in 2 Platoon, Combat Team TUSK, Mentoring and Reconstruction Task Force 1, in the Chora Valley, Afghanistan on 29 December 2008.	

=== Conspicuous Service Cross (CSC) ===
Conspicuous Service Cross ribbon

Branch	Recipient	Citation	Notes
Navy	Petty Officer Richard Allen Currie	For outstanding achievement as the Catering Services Manager, Fleet Logistic Support Element, HMAS Cairns in the provision of Catering Services and training.	
Navy	Captain Raymond John Leggatt RAN	For outstanding achievement as the Commanding Officer HMAS Watson and as the Training Authority Maritime Warfare.	
Navy	Captain Scott Jeffrey Lockey RAN	For outstanding achievement as the Officer-in-Charge of the Rotary Wing Section in the Directorate General Technical Airworthiness and as the Chief Engineer of the Naval Aviation System Program Office.	
Navy	Commander Paul Karpo Mandziy	For outstanding achievement as the Commanding Officer of HMAS Manoora.	
Army	Brigadier Michael John Arnold	For outstanding achievement as the Commander Joint Task Force 662 on Operation VICFIRE ASSIST in February and March 2009.	
Army	Lieutenant Colonel Matthew Charles Brumley	For outstanding achievement as a Staff Officer in the Force Development Group of the Land Warfare Development Centre.	
Army	Major Peter Sean Carnes	For outstanding achievement as the Staff Officer Grade Two Simulation Operations in Army Simulation Wing, Land Warfare Development Centre.	
Army	Lieutenant Colonel Mark Gerard Flanagan	For outstanding achievement as Commanding Officer, 42nd Battalion, Royal Queensland Regiment and Rotation 15 of Combined Task Force 635, Operation ANODE.	
Army	Major Wayne Lee Gough	For outstanding achievement as the Chief of Plans, Unit-level Mission Rehearsal Exercises, Combat Training Centre Live, Combat Training Centre.	
Army	Lieutenant Colonel Timothy David Griggs	For outstanding achievement as Deputy Director Combat Support in Land Development Branch, Capability Development Group, since January 2005.	
Army	Lieutenant Colonel James Angus McTavish	For outstanding achievement as the Chief of Staff, Headquarters, Army Recruit Training Centre.	
Army	Lieutenant Colonel Henry William Marr	For outstanding achievement as Staff Officer Grade One and Acting Director Supply Chain Operations, Headquarters Joint Logistics Command, Melbourne.	
Army	Colonel William Parker Monfries	For outstanding achievement as the Commander's Education, Training and Development adviser at Headquarters Training Command-Army.	
Army	Colonel Cameron Leigh Purdey	For outstanding achievement in providing logistics support as Commanding Officer 10th Force Support Battalion.	
Air Force	Wing Commander Philip Blair Arms	For outstanding achievement as Deputy Director, Aircrew Sustainability Project.	
Air Force	Wing Commander David Russell Ashworth	For outstanding achievement as Commanding Officer, Number 1 Recruit Training Unit.	
Air Force	Wing Commander Nicholas Clarke MBE	For outstanding achievement as the Staff Officer Grade 1 Satellite Communications in the Directorate of Communications and Network Operations within the Chief Information Officer Group.	
Air Force	Group Captain Gary James Martin AM	For outstanding achievement as the Director C-17A Transition Team during the introduction of the C-17A Globemaster III aircraft into service.	
Air Force	Warrant Officer Paul Robert Martin	For outstanding achievement as the Warrant Officer Engineer at Number 37 Squadron.	

=== Conspicuous Service Medal (CSM) ===
Conspicuous Service Medal ribbon

Branch	Recipient	Citation	Notes
Navy	Lieutenant Commander David Grieve Brown RAN	For meritorious achievement as the Weapons Electrical Engineering Officer in HMAS Farncomb during preparation for, and conduct of, operations between February 2006 and June 2007.	
Navy	Commander Wendy Anne Bullen RAN	For meritorious achievement as the Navy Graded Other Ranks Pay Case Coordinator in support of Navy personnel.	
Navy	Chief Petty Officer Neil Ian Chaplin	For meritorious achievement as Deputy Marine Engineering Officer (Chief Artificer) in HMAS Farncomb.	
Navy	Lieutenant Commander Scott Anthony Houlihan RAN	For meritorious achievement to the Royal Australian Navy as the Port Services Manager, Fleet Base East, HMAS Kuttabul.	
Navy	Chief Petty Officer Benjamin Mark McQueen	For meritorious achievement while employed as Chief Boatswain on board the Landing Platform Amphibious HMAS Manoora.	
Army	Warrant Officer Class One Paul Michael Casey	For meritorious achievement as the personnel establishment subject matter expert in the Army Headquarters Organisation Section Review Team.	
Army	Captain Brendan Frederick Hayward	For meritorious achievement as the Battle Group Intelligence Officer, ANZAC East Timor Battle Group Four.	
Army	Warrant Officer Class One Birralee Ann King	For meritorious achievement as the Regimental Quartermaster Sergeant of the 3rd Combat Service Support Battalion.	
Army	Major Gregory Kohlmeyer	For meritorious achievement as the Senior Instructor-Ordnance and Staff Officer Grade One Development, Army Logistic Training Centre.	
Army	Corporal Simon Lawrence Majewski	For meritorious achievement as a Section Commander and Acting Platoon Sergeant within the 7th Battalion, The Royal Australian Regiment and in the development, training and deployment of the first Operational Mentoring and Liaison Team.	
Army	Major James William Robins	For meritorious achievement as Head of the Intelligence Section of the Counter Improvised Explosive Device Task Force.	
Army	Major Selina Alice Rowland	For meritorious achievement as the Senior Instructor External Training Wing, Royal Military College, Duntroon.	
Army	Major Mark Anthony Scully	For meritorious achievement as the Staff Officer Grade Two Employment Management, Directorate of Workforce Management-Army.	
Army	Warrant Officer Class One Colin Friar Speirs	For meritorious achievement as the Electronics Counter Measures Warrant Officer of the Army Explosive Hazards Centre.	
Army	Sergeant T	For meritorious achievement in capability development for Australian Defence Force Counter Terrorism.	
Air Force	Squadron Leader Stephen William Clarke	For meritorious achievement as a Qualified Flying Instructor within Number 82 Wing.	
Air Force	Squadron Leader Nicholas Simon Elliott	For meritorious achievement as the Senior Engineering Officer at Number 11 Squadron.	
Air Force	Flight Sergeant Adrian James Lee	For meritorious achievement as the Senior Non-Commissioned Officer-in-Charge of Avionics Section at Number 3 Squadron.	
Air Force	Squadron Leader Adam Joshua Long	For meritorious achievement as ‘B’ Flight Commander at Number 2 Operational Conversion Unit.	
Air Force	Wing Commander Stephen Trevor Mallett	For meritorious achievement as Staff Officer Technical Capability at Headquarters Combat Support Group, Royal Australian Air Force Base Amberley.	
