= Julia King (disambiguation) =

Julia King, Baroness Brown of Cambridge (born 1954) is a British engineer and member of the House of Lords.

Juila King may also refer to:

- Julia King (Australian businesswoman)
- Julia King (field hockey) (born 1992)

== See also ==
- Gloria Julia King, footballer, businesswoman, and politician in Vanuatu
- Julie King (born 1989), American soccer player
