= University of Canberra =

Public university in Canberra, Australia

Coordinates: 35°14′20″S 149°05′15″E

- Former name: Canberra College of Advanced Education (1967–1990)
- Motto: Ngunawal: Galambany
- Motto in English: "We all, including you"
- Type: Public research university
- Established: 1967 (advanced college); 1990 (university status)
- Accreditation: TEQSA
- Affiliations: Innovative Research Universities (IRU)
- Budget: A$398.04 million (2023)
- Chancellor: Lisa Paul
- Vice-Chancellor: Bill Shorten
- Total staff: 1,322 regular (2023); 276 casual (2023)
- Students: 11,518 (EFTSL, 2023)
- Undergraduates: 7,729 (2023)
- Postgraduates: 2,908 (2023)
- Other students: 459 UC College (2023)
- Location: 11 Kirinari Street, Canberra, ACT, 2617, Australia
- Campus: Urban
- Colours: Blue
- Sporting affiliations: UniSport; EAEN
- Mascot: Cappie the Giraffe
- Website: canberra.edu.au

The University of Canberra (UC) is a public research university with its main campus located in Bruce, Canberra, Australian Capital Territory. The campus is 2.5 km (1.6 mi) from Belconnen Town Centre, and 8.7 km (5.4 mi) from Canberra's Civic Centre. UC offers undergraduate and postgraduate courses through five faculties: Arts and Design; Business, Government and Law; Education; Health; and Science and Technology.

== History ==
The University of Canberra was first established in 1967 as the Canberra College of Advanced Education. It became the University of Canberra under sponsorship of Monash University in 1990.

=== Foundation stone ===
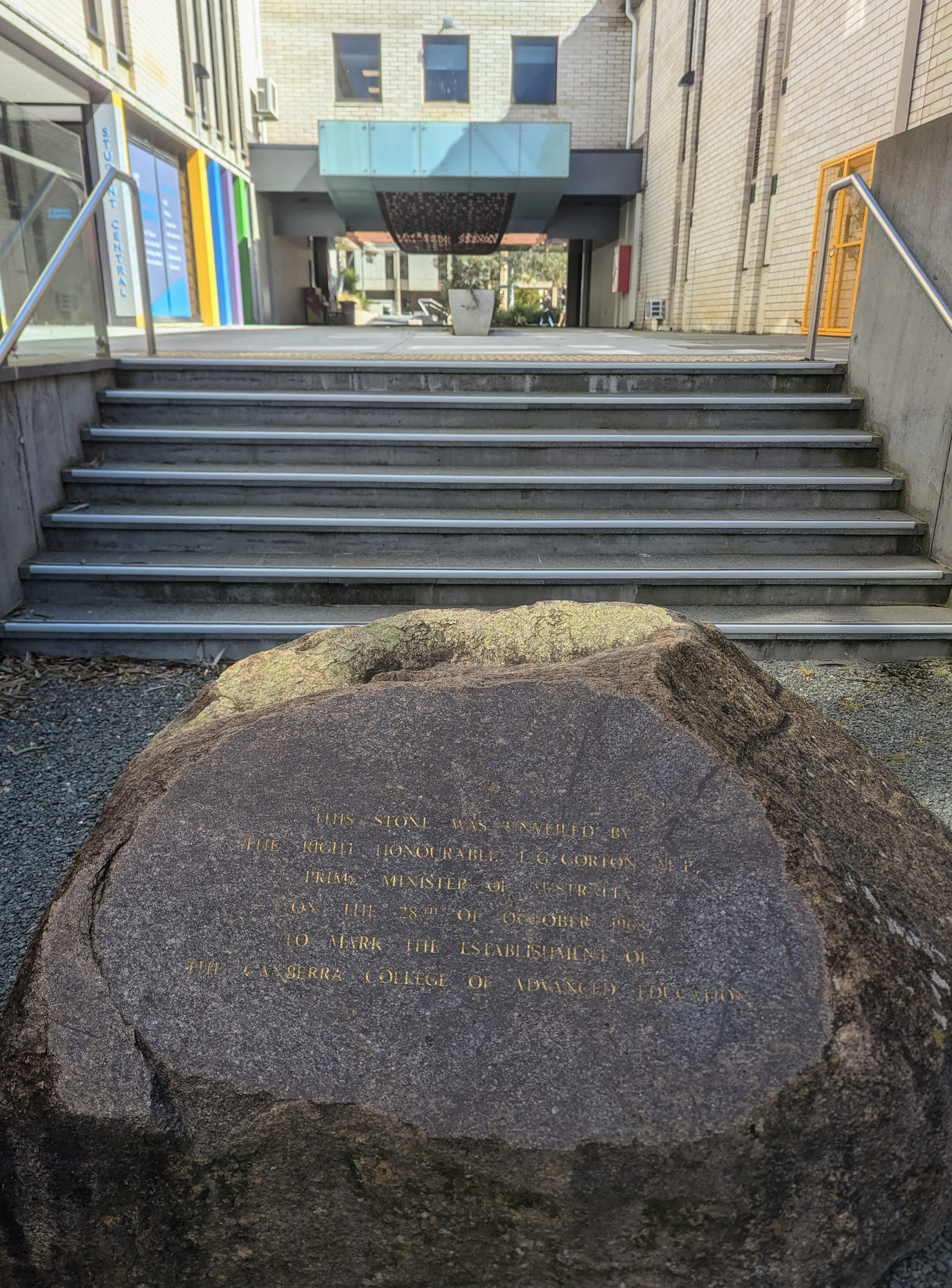
The University of Canberra granite foundation stone is accessible via stairs outside Building 1

The UC foundation stone was unveiled by Prime Minister John Gorton on 28 October 1968. The stone is displayed near Building 1 on the Bruce campus. The inscription reads:

This Stone was unveiled by the right honourable J.G. Gorton, M.P., Prime Minister of Australia, on 28 October 1968, to mark the establishment of the Canberra College of Advanced Education.

=== Stonefest ===
An annual celebration, called Stone Day, was first held in 1971. It has since evolved into a popular music festival. Stone Day traditionally took place after classes finished at the end of Semester 2, but before exams. The day before was known as Stone Eve. Stone Day involved a music festival with local bands.

Over the years, the Stone Day program grew larger, expanding to a whole week in 1976, and became Stoneweek. In the 1980s and 1990s, Stoneweek was a popular Canberra entertainment event and one of Australia's most popular music festivals. In 2000, the festival became Stonefest.

Beginning in 2012, Stonefest was not held for a number of years at the University of Canberra. In 2014, UC created a mini-music Stonefest festival with a DJ and numerous activities, however it was not received well. In 2019, Stonefest returned, with both local and international acts, but did not run in 2020–2021 due to the COVID-19 pandemic, returning in 2022.

== Campuses and buildings ==
=== Bruce ===
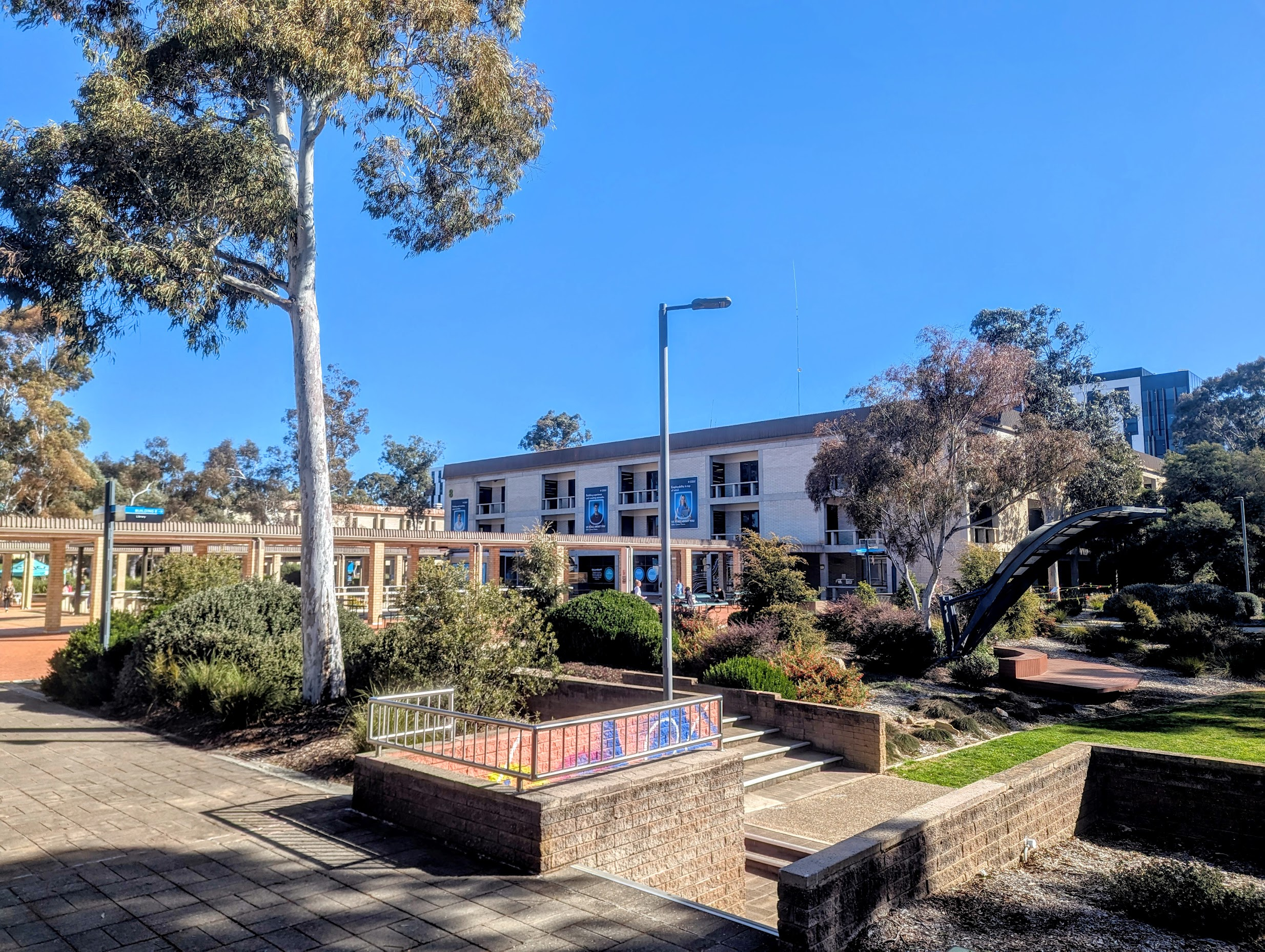
Looking south-west from the Bruce campus main concourse towards Building 8 (the library).

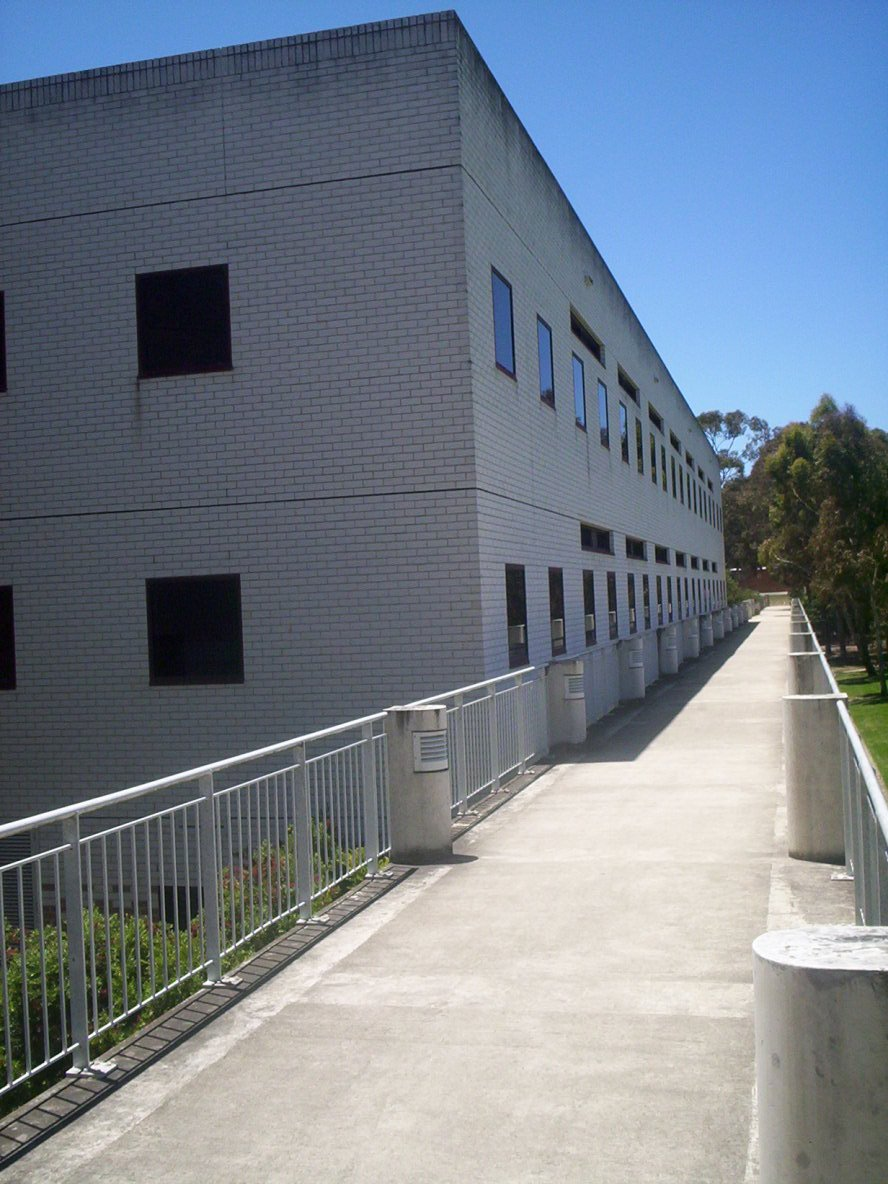
The Building 11 walkway connecting the refectory with the gym

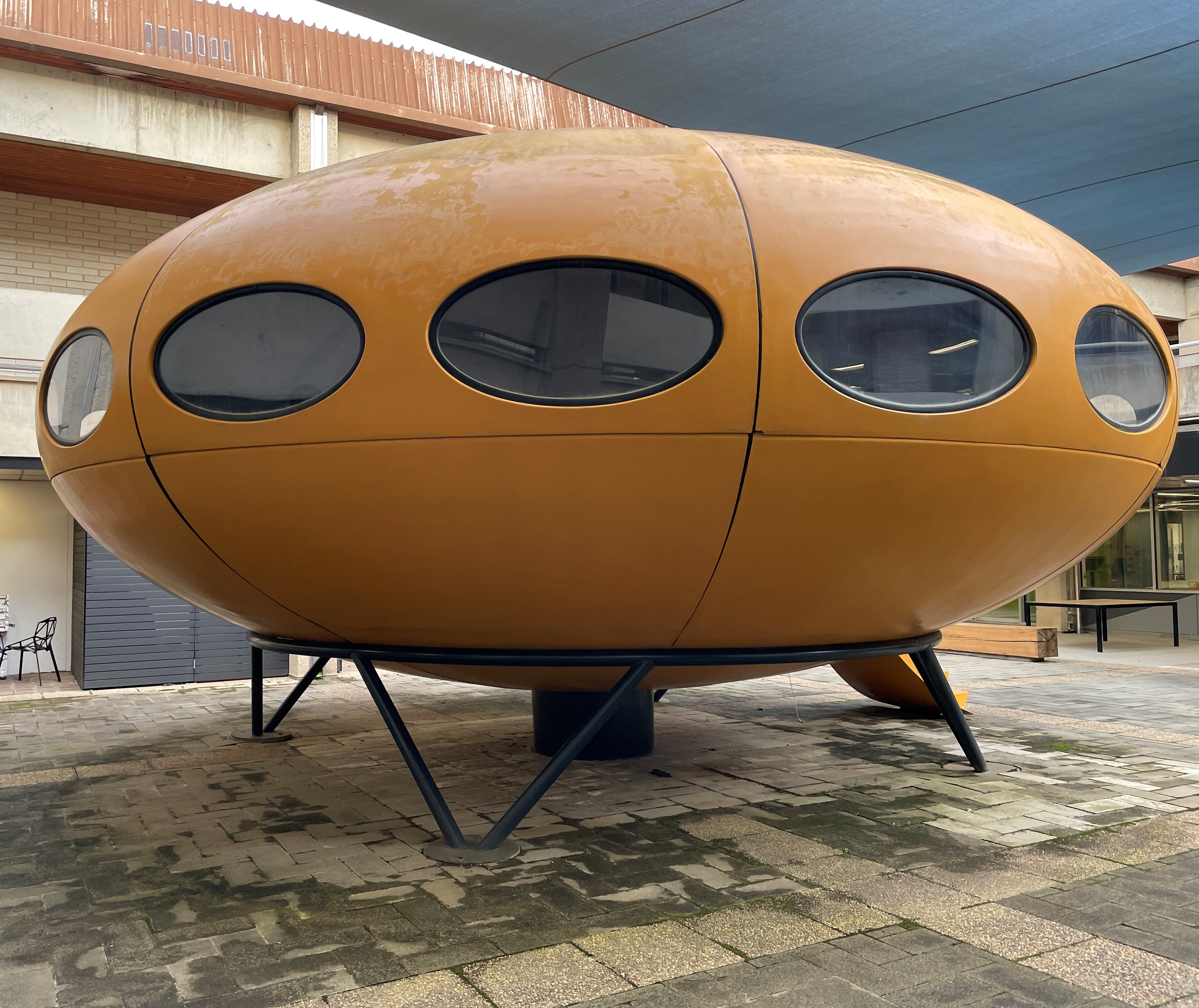
A restored Futuro house is located in the Bruce campus Building 5 courtyard

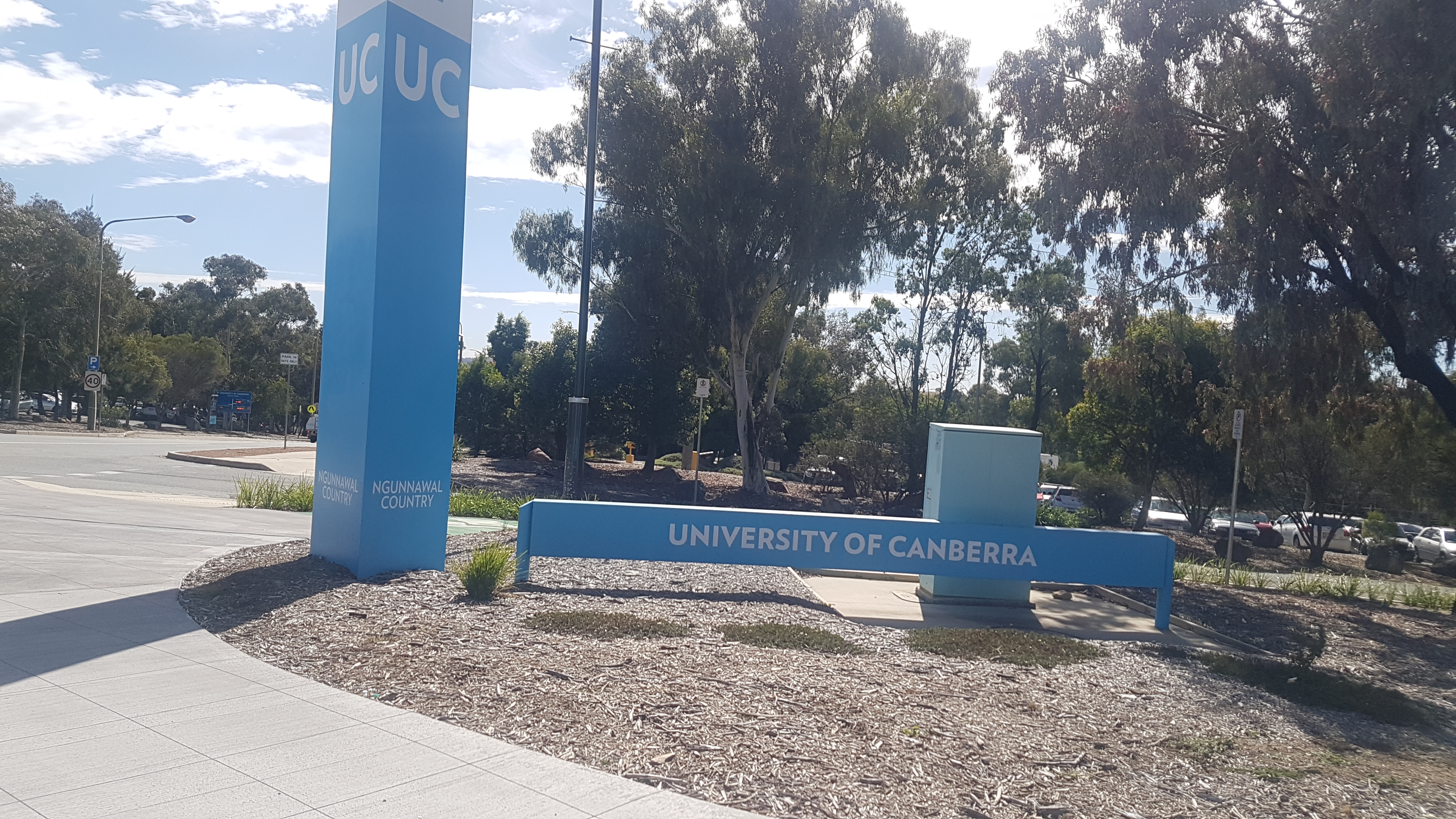
One of the entrances to the University of Canberra's Bruce campus

The university's main campus is located in the suburb of Bruce and covers 296 acres (1.2 km^{2}) of buildings, ovals, gardens, lawns, car parks, roads, walkways, and sculptures. The campus is notable for its native gardens and the presence of kangaroos. There are over 29 buildings dedicated to teaching, research, and administration for the disciplines, faculties and business units. These buildings are concentrated around the main concourse. Each building is numbered and many do not hold any title or namesake. At the northern end of the campus is the University of Canberra Hospital which focuses on rehabilitation.

==== Facilities ====
The Refectory is located in Building 1, operated by UCX (the student union). It provides a food court, general shop, pool tables, and lounges, and is also a concert venue. Upstairs there are study rooms which can be booked by students and staff.

The Hub is located under the main concourse, providing a café, hairdressing salon, tattoo parlour, and social enterprise hub. A bar, convenience store, and several eateries are also available near the student residences.

A sport and fitness centre is located in Building 29 with gym facilities and is home to Brumbies Rugby administration. There are basketball and squash courts nearby in Building 4, and various sporting ovals.

Two radio studios are located in Building 9. These studios are home to UCFM, UC's student radio station.

=== Other sites ===
The university has satellite campuses in the following locations Campus locations:

- Queensland
  - TAFE Queensland Brisbane (South Bank)
  - TAFE Queensland Brisbane (Mount Gravatt)
- Sydney
  - University of Canberra Sydney Hills campus (Castle Hill)
  - TAFE NSW Northern Sydney (RTO)

== Governance and structure ==
=== University Council ===
The governing body of the University of Canberra is its University Council. The current chancellor is Lisa Paul, AO PSM, a former senior Australian public servant and policymaker who was a long-serving Secretary of the Department of Education and Training.

Bill Shorten is the current and 7th vice-chancellor (VC), who took over in February 2025, following a disruptive leadership period triggered by the sudden departure of Professor Paddy Nixon who served as VC from 6 April 2020 to 15 December 2023. Professor Stephen Parker was the interim vice-chancellor for a short period, having previously served as VC 2007–2016. Parker took over from Professor Lucy Johnston who was the interim VC following the Paddy Nixon's departure. Prior to Professor Nixon, Professor Deep Saini was VC from 1 September 2016 to 21 December 2019.

=== Faculties and departments ===
Currently, there are five faculties, however there is a proposed for the University of Canberra to consolidate its structure into two faculties from 2027 onwards.

Arts and Design

Arts and design specialises in architecture, landscape architecture, graphic design, communication studies, culture and heritage, journalism, creative writing and poetry, international studies, and media arts. The faculty has two schools: School of Design and the Built Environment and School of Arts and Communication.

Business, Government and Law

The Business Government and Law Faculty provides courses in accounting, applied economics, business administration, business informatics, construction, economics, finance, law, management, marketing, politics, sociology, public policy, tourism, and urban and regional planning. The Faculty has three schools: Canberra Business School, Canberra Law School, and Canberra School of Politics, Economics & Society.

Education

The Education faculty offers courses designed to cover all stages of teacher development with courses in early childhood, primary and secondary. The faculty is home to the Australian National Museum of Education.

Health

The Faculty of Health prepares a wide range of allied health professionals, including in counselling, exercise science, nursing and midwifery, nutrition and dietetics, occupational therapy, optometry, pharmacy, physiotherapy and exercise physiology and rehabilitation, psychology, medical imaging, speech pathology, and sports management.

Science and Technology

The Faculty of Science and Technology trains students in environmental sciences, biomedical and forensic as well as information technology, information systems, engineering, and mathematics. The Faculty has two schools: School of Science and the School of Information Technology and Systems.

=== Finances ===
Like most Australian universities, University of Canberra derives the majority of its revenue from the Australian Government through the Commonwealth Grant Scheme, student fees, research grants and contracts, commercial activities, and donations. The ACT Government provides around one percent of the university's operating budget.

The university's budget in 2022 was A$312.84 million (2022). In 2024, the University of Canberra is expecting a $36 million deficit which triggered emergency spending constraints. The deficit is partly attributed to a decline in international student enrolments. The financial situation lead to the announcement in October 2024 of urgent and significant cost-saving measures, including an estimated 200 job cuts by the middle of 2025.

== Academic profile ==
=== Research divisions ===
The university has several research centres relating to its areas of research strength. These are:

- Canberra Urban and Regional Futures
- Centre for Ageing Research and Translation (CARAT)
- Centre for Creative and Cultural Research
- Centre for Research and Action in Public Health
- Centre for Research in Therapeutic Solutions
- Collaborative Indigenous Research Initiative
- Health Research Institute
- Institute for Applied Ecology
- Institute for Governance and Policy Analysis
- Invasive Animals Cooperative Research Centre
- Murray-Darling Basin Futures Collaborative Research Network
- Nexus Research Centre
- News and Media Research Centre
- Research Institute for Sport and Exercise
- STEM Education Research Centre
- SYNERGY Nursing and Midwifery Research Centre

=== Library ===
The University of Canberra Library is located in Building 8. The building has four floors.

=== Australian National Museum of Education ===
The Australian National Museum of Education (ANME) has been located in Building 5 of the University since 2003. It holds a collection of items related to the history of education in Australia. The ANME comprises both a repository of documents and artefacts at its University premises, and a distributed national collection which brings together virtually archival material held in schools and school museums throughout Australia. The museum was founded by former teacher, university lecturer and educational consultant Dr Malcolm Beazley AM.

=== Academic reputation ===
University rankings

Global – Overall
- ARWU World: 801–900 (2024)
- CWTS World: 1266 (Note: The CWTS Leiden Ranking is based on P (top 10%).) (2024)
- QS World: =494 (2026)
- THE World: 401–500 (2025)
- USNWR Global: =847 (25/26)

National – Overall
- ARWU National: 30 (2024)
- CWTS National: 34 (2024)
- ERA National: 33 (2018)
- QS National: 27 (2026)
- THE National: 26–32 (2025)
- USNWR National: 31 (25/26)
- AFR National: =31 (2025)

National publications

In the Australian Financial Review Best Universities Ranking 2025, the university was tied #31 amongst Australian universities.

Global publications

In the 2026 Quacquarelli Symonds World University Rankings (published 2025), the university attained a tied position of #494 (27th nationally).

In the Times Higher Education World University Rankings 2026 (published 2025), the university attained a position of #401–500 (tied 26–32nd nationally).

In the 2024 Academic Ranking of World Universities, the university attained a position of #801–900 (30th nationally).

In the 2025–2026 U.S. News & World Report Best Global Universities, the university attained a tied position of #847 (31th nationally).

In the CWTS Leiden Ranking 2024, the university attained a position of #1266 (34th nationally).

=== Student outcomes ===
The Australian Government's QILT (Note: Abbreviation for Quality Indicators for Learning and Teaching.) conducts national surveys documenting the student life cycle from enrolment through to employment. These surveys place more emphasis on criteria such as student experience, graduate outcomes and employer satisfaction than perceived reputation, research output and citation counts.

In the 2023 Employer Satisfaction Survey, graduates of the university had an overall employer satisfaction rate of 78.3%.

In the 2023 Graduate Outcomes Survey, graduates of the university had a full-time employment rate of 85.3% for undergraduates and 92.9% for postgraduates. The initial full-time salary was A$71,000 for undergraduates and A$84,600 for postgraduates.

In the 2023 Student Experience Survey, undergraduates at the university rated the quality of their entire educational experience at 72.7% meanwhile postgraduates rated their overall education experience at 74.5%.

=== Partnerships and affiliations ===
UC partners with two local ACT schools: UC Senior Secondary College Lake Ginninderra and University of Canberra High School Kaleen. The University of Canberra College provides pathways into university for domestic and international students. UC also shares a memorandum of understanding with the Canberra Institute of Technology which facilitates student educational pathways between the institutions and sharing of some specialist facilities.

In August 2026, the UC Vice-Chancellor and the ACT Chief Minister announced a renewed Civic Partnership Agreement between UC and the ACT Government to explore the merger of UC and the Canberra Institute of Technology, a vocational education provider with five campuses located in Canberra.

== Student life ==
=== Student demographics ===
Over 100,000 students have graduated from the university since 1970.

After a rapid period of growth which saw a 78% increase in student enrolments between 2007 and 2014, UC has sustained an annual enrolment of between 11,000 and 12,000 equivalent full-time students. The median Australian Tertiary Admission Rank of UC students was approximately 71 in 2012.

=== Student media ===
An independent radio station, UCFM, is run by students and the Faculty of Arts and Design from the main UC campus.

=== Sports and athletics ===
The university has several sporting partnerships including sponsoring the University of Canberra Capitals, a professional women's basketball team, the ACT Brumbies, a professional rugby union team, and the University of Canberra Firebirds, an amateur American football club.

On Saturday 17 June 2023, UC announced a one million dollar sponsorship of, and partnership with, Stromlo Forest Park that will expand its research and teaching activities across a range of sports, tourism, and business opportunities.

=== Student accommodation ===
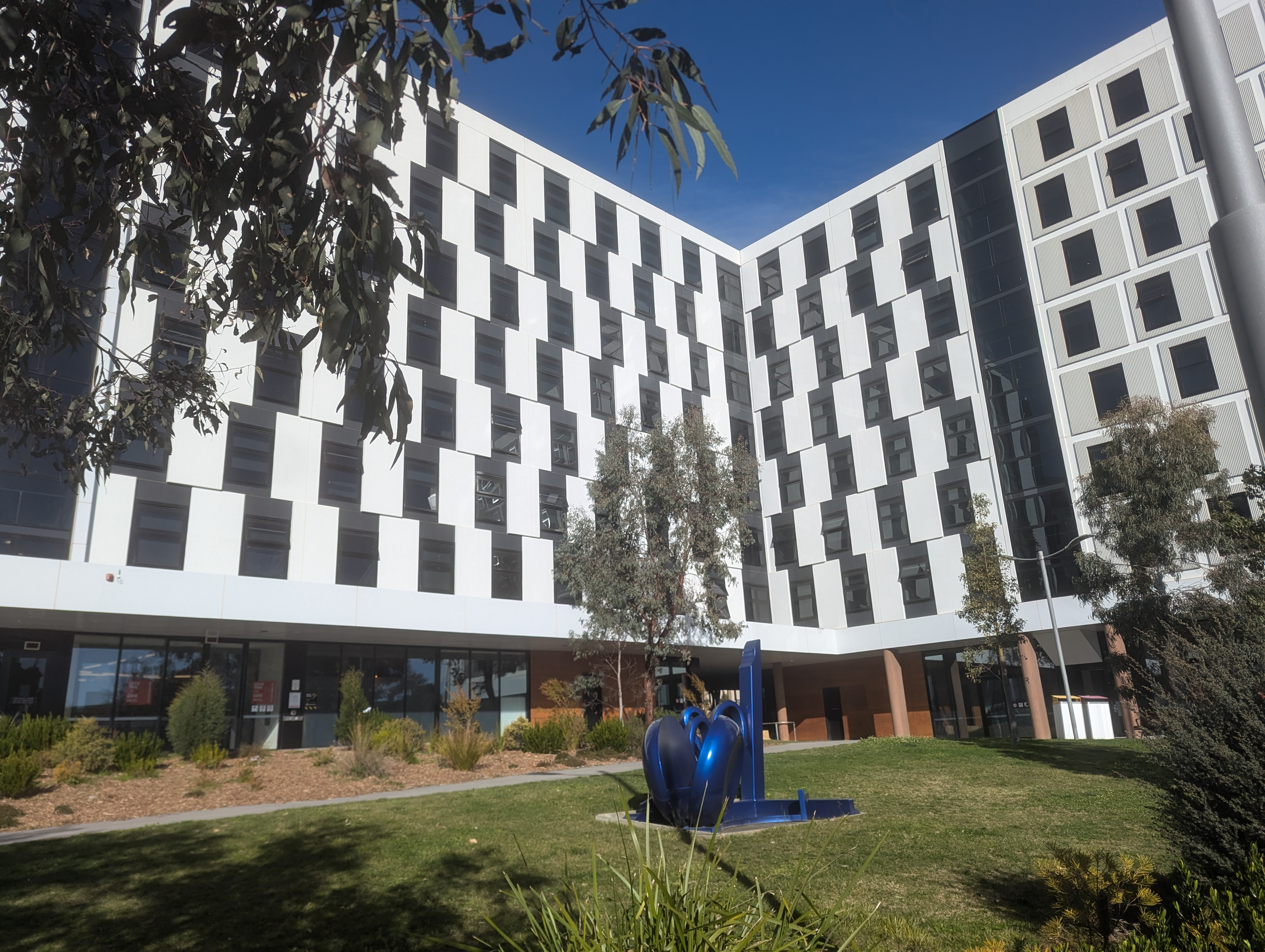
UC Lodge is the most recently constructed (2016) student accommodation

There are three on-campus accommodation options for students with a total of 2,476 beds—Campus West, Cooper Lodge, and UC Lodge, all run by UniLodge Australia Pty Ltd. In addition, off-campus accommodations in the neighbouring suburb of Belconnen include Weeden Lodge run by UniLodge and UniGardens run by UniGardens Pty Ltd. These accommodation options are available to all students, including international students.

== Notable people ==
=== Academics and staff ===
Notable staff members include/have included:

- Janine Deakin, geneticist
- John Dryzek, political scientist
- Patricia Easteal, professor of law
- Donald Horne, journalist, writer, social critic, historian and public intellectual
- Peter Leahy, former Chief of Army (Australia)
- Michelle Lincoln, speech pathologist and Deputy Vice-Chancellor (Academic)
- Ingrid Moses, emeritus professor and a former chancellor
- Susan Ryan, one-time Labor government minister

== See also ==
- List of universities in Australia
- University of Canberra (Wikiversity)

== Bibliography ==
- Canberra Times (10 March 2011). "UC regional expansion plans closer". Canberra Times. Archived from the original on 17 March 2011.
- Goulburn Post (13 March 2011). "University bid fails". Goulburn Post. Archived from the original on 18 March 2011.
- MacDonald, Emma (17 February 2011). "Hawke urges UC, CIT to tie knot". Canberra Times. Archived from the original on 24 March 2011.
- Towell, Noel (28 February 2011). "Cameron Offices set to house UC students". Canberra Times. Archived from the original on 2 March 2011.
