= Defence Delivery Agency =

Agency of the Australian Government responsible for defence procurement

Defence Delivery Agency Defence Delivery Group
Agency overview
- Formed: 1 July 2026 (group); 1 July 2027 (agency)
- Preceding agencies: Guided Weapons and Explosive Ordnance Group; Capability Acquisition and Sustainment Group; Naval Shipbuilding and Sustainment Group
- Jurisdiction: Australian Government
- Minister responsible: Richard Marles, Defence
- Agency executive: TBD, National Armaments Director

The Defence Delivery Agency (or Defence Delivery Group) is an Australian Government agency announced in December 2025 responsible for military acquisition projects of the Australian Defence Force. To be led by a National Armaments Director, the organisation will be originally formed on 1 July 2026, later evolving to an independent autonomous agency a year thereafter. The agency will consist of the merged Capability Acquisition and Sustainment Group, Guided Weapons and Explosive Ordnance Group (GWEO) and the Naval Shipbuilding and Sustainment Group (NSSG).

== History ==
On 1 December 2025, minister for defence and deputy prime minister Richard Marles announced alongside minister for defence industry Pat Conroy that the incumbent Labor government would merge 3 agencies: the Capability Acquisition and Sustainment Group; the Guided Weapons and Explosive Ordnance Group; and the Naval Shipbuilding and Sustainment Group to form a new Defence Delivery Agency, which would first be known as the Defence Delivery Group. This initial stage would be finalised on 1 July 2026, with the creation of the combined group led by the National Armaments Director. A year later, on 1 July 2027, the second stage would be completed, transforming the group into the Defence Delivery Agency, an autonomous independent authority with its leadership reporting directly to the aforementioned ministers. The announcement coincided with the revelation that the ADF was tracking a People's Liberation Army Navy flotilla in the Philippine Sea.

== Structure ==
=== Leadership ===
The group and later agency will be led by a National Armaments Director, who is yet to be appointed.

Officeholder	Title	Organisation	Start date	Appointed by
TBD	National Armaments Director	Defence Delivery Group	TBD	Albanese government

=== Merger ===
The agency merges 3 prior Department of Defence procurement groups, each responsible for a niche of acquisition. These groups are:

- Guided Weapons and Explosive Ordnance Group, primarily responsible for Australia's advanced missile programs
- Naval Shipbuilding and Sustainment Group, responsible for domestic shipbuilding and maintenance for the Royal Australian Navy
- Capability Acquisition and Sustainment Group, broadly focused on capability, sustainment and supply chain management.

== Notable programs ==
=== Australian Army ===
- M142 HIMARS
- Precision Strike Missile
- AS21 Redback

=== Royal Australian Air Force ===
- Hypersonic Attack Cruise Missile
- Boeing MQ-28 Ghost Bat

=== Royal Australian Navy ===
- Australian general purpose frigate program
- Hunter-class frigate
- SSN-AUKUS
