= Ian Heads =

Australian historian and journalist (1943–2024)

Ian Heads OAM
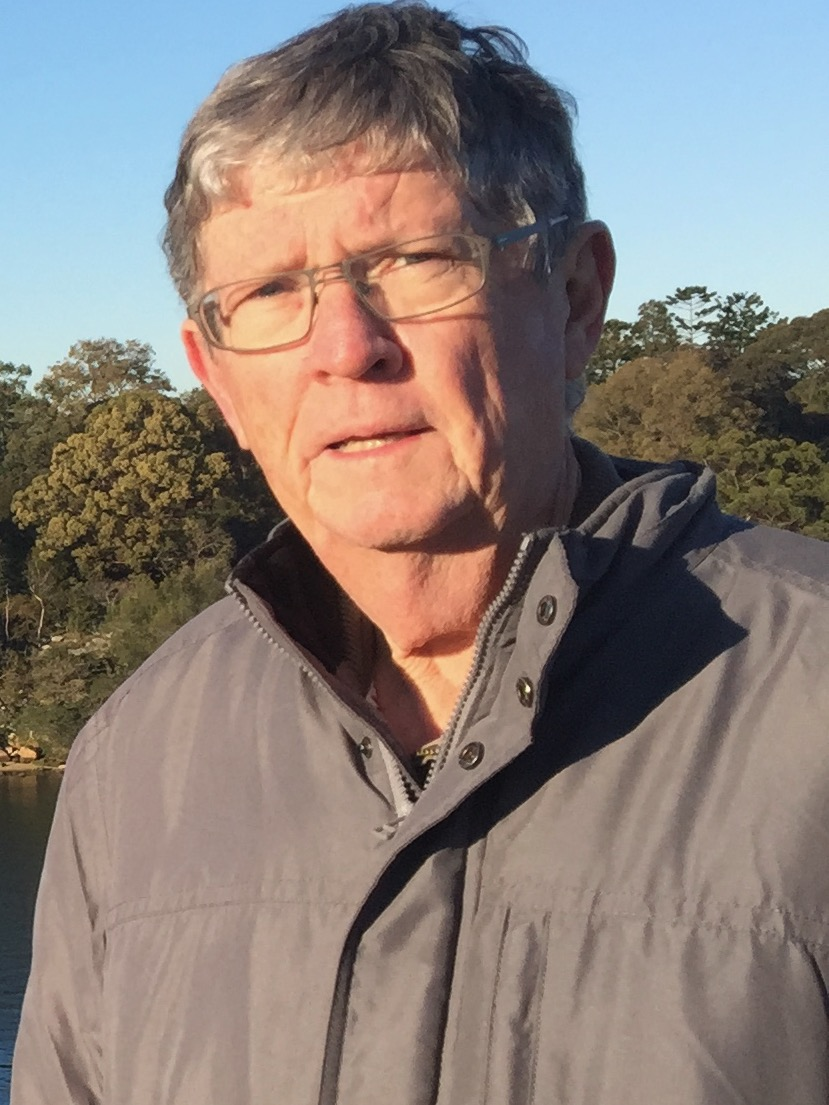
- Heads in 2015
- Born: Ian John Heads; 15 February 1943; Rose Bay, Sydney, Australia
- Died: 25 March 2024 (aged 81)
- Education: Sydney Boys High
- Occupations: Historian, journalist, author, sportswriter
- Writing career
- Language: English
- Website: www.ianheads.weebly.com

Ian John Heads OAM (15 February 1943 – 25 March 2024) was an Australian historian, journalist, commentator and author. He was described as "Australia's foremost rugby league historian" by the National Museum of Australia.

In the reconstruction period following World War II, sport was exceptionally prominent in Australian society. Like many of his contemporaries, Heads was a sports-mad preteen and teenager. After completing high school, he began work as a copy boy in the early 1960s for the Sydney Daily Telegraph, but soon rose through the ranks to become the main journalist covering rugby league for most of his long career. At times, he also wrote for the Sydney Morning Herald and the Herald-Sun. He also spent some years as the much praised editor of the magazine Rugby League Week.

Heads wrote more than 50 books, mostly on rugby league personalities, but also significant books on other sports, and some books of general interest. He also wrote a comprehensive history of Australian sport since 1788, histories of rugby league in general, and chronicles of several sporting clubs.

Most of his sport articles and reports on events such as the Olympic Games, the Australian national rugby league team and the Rugby League World Cup, national and international swimming, Davis Cup and international tennis were in newspapers and magazines. He also contributed to other works in collaboration with David Middleton, Gary Lester, Norman Tasker and Geoff Armstrong.

== Early life and formative experiences ==
Ian John Heads was born on 15 February 1943 in Rose Bay, a suburb of Sydney. It was the midst of World War II. He was brought up during the war and in the postwar reconstruction years, a period of recovery, rationing and deprivation. His father, Flight Lieutenant George Heads of the Royal Australian Air Force, was killed in action. His plane crashed over Milne Bay in New Guinea on 7 June 1944 while transporting supplies to the troops fighting the Japanese.

In his semi-autobiographical essay "The Accidental Sportswriter", Heads describes how, fathered by his uncles, Ken and Cecil Appleton, the seven-year-old was taken to the Sydney Cricket Ground to watch the deciding test match of the 1950 rugby league Ashes. To the great joy of the spectators, Australia defeated Great Britain, the first win they had had for 30 years. In this match, Heads witnessed the famous try by Ron Roberts, described as "arguably the most famous try in Australian rugby league history". He recalled the day as an inspiring and memorable event in his young life.

Dave Sands, the indigenous middleweight boxing champion, was a motivating hero to the sports-mad teenager in the years up to Sands' early death on 12 August 1952. The death affected Heads deeply.

In 1951, his uncle Cecil Appleton took his eight-year-old nephew to the Davis Cup, Australia versus America, when the Australian tennis player Frank Sedgman defeated Vic Seixas in the deciding match. When he was thirteen years of age, another significant contribution to Ian Heads' sporting orientation occurred. At great financial sacrifice by his mother, he travelled by bus from Sydney to Melbourne for the 1956 Olympic Games. Heads attended Sydney Boys High School where he gained his Leaving Certificate at the end of 1960.

== Career ==
Heads began his sports journalistic career at the Sydney Daily Telegraph in the early 1960s. In 1970, he joined the newly established Rugby League Week, a successful magazine which at one stage sold 90,000 copies of each issue. From 1981 to 1987, he occupied the position of editor, a challenge in which he was most successful. He is described in the Hall of Fame wall plaque in his honour as "a superb mentor for many aspiring journalists". Leading rugby league historian David Middleton told how he was among dozens of young journalists inspired and mentored by Heads over a long period. Said Middleton, "The words I most associate with Ian are integrity, decency and respect".

At the time of his death tributes abounded, acclaiming Ian Heads as the “doyen” of Australia sports journalism. At a ceremony at the Sydney Cricket Ground and in the general press he was publicly praised by many noteworthy commentators for his gentlemanly demeanour and his unwavering commitment to journalistic integrity.

Many quoted a significant incident in his career which underscored his sense of fairness and his commitment to ethical standards. On 9 October 1999, Heads reported on a large-scale protest against the exclusion of South Sydney Rugby League Club from the upcoming season. Some estimated the attendance at this protest as 50,000 persons and claimed it was the largest public rally in Australia’s sporting history. Despite the newsworthiness of the event, his story was ultimately censored by News Limited, the owner of the Sunday Telegraph, where he worked, and a major stakeholder in rugby league. In protest against this censorship, Heads resigned from his position, demonstrating the value he put on unbiased and balanced reporting and the public's right to information.

He attended the 2008 Olympic Games in Beijing as editor of ASPIRE, the official newsletter of the Australian Olympic team. ASPIRE was published daily for the duration of the games. He also led the Australian Olympic Committee Media office at the 1996 Olympic Games in Atlanta and the 2000 Olympic Games in Sydney.

== Death ==
Heads died on 25 March 2024, at the age of 81.

== Honours ==
- On 1 April 2005, Heads received a Certificate of Appreciation from John Coates, chef de mission of the Australian Olympic team, for his media work at the 28th Olympic Games held from 13 to 29 August 2004 in Athens, Greece.
- In the 2010 Australia Day Honours, Heads was awarded the Medal of the Order of Australia (OAM) for "services to the media as a sports journalist, author and mentor".
- On 29 November 2006, Heads received a Lifetime Achievement Award from the Australian Sports Commission for his contribution to Australian sports journalism.
- In 2014, at the inaugural induction, Heads was entered on the Sydney Cricket Ground Media Hall of Honour.
- In 2015, Heads received the National Road Motorist Association (NRMA) supported Kennedy Award for Outstanding Lifetime Achievement for excellence in sports journalism.
- On 19 July 2023 at the Sydney Cricket Ground, Ian Heads was inducted into the National Rugby League Hall of Fame. At the ceremony, he was described as a "doyen of Rugby League journalism", "one of the game's great story tellers" ... "a giant in journalism".

== Published books ==
- The History of Souths, 1908-1985 (1985)
- Winning Starts on Monday: Yarns and Inspiration from the Jack Gibson Collection. Lester-Townsend Publishing. (1989)
- True Blue: The Story of the NSW Rugby League. Ironbark. Australia. (1992)
- When All is Said and Done – Jack Gibson Ironbark. (1994)
- Never Say Die. The Fight to Save The Rabbitohs.

--- The South Sydney (Rabbitohs) is an original rugby league club which in one era was almost rubbed out of existence.

- Mark Taylor: A Captain’s Year. (1997). Macmillan.
- 200 Years of Australian Sport: a Glorious Obsession With G. Lester. (1988)
- Played Strong Done Fine: the Jack Gibson Collection (1988).

--- Jack Gibson was renowned as an Australian Rugby league player and "super" coach. He is credited with bringing rugby league from semi-professionalism to professionalism with innovative training methods.

- Reilly: a Life in Rugby League. Malcolm Reilly (1998). Ironbark.
- Backpage: Australian Greatest Sporting Moments (1989)
- Sterlo – the Story of a Champion – Peter Sterling (1989)

--- Sterling was a distinguished rugby league footballer and later a commentator and television personality.

- Local Hero – the Wayne Pearce Story (1990).

--- Wayne Pearce played rugby league for the Balmain Tigers and representative matches. He later became a coach and made a positive contribution to rugby league politics during turbulent times.

- Quick Whit – The Mike Whitney Story (1993).

--- Mike Whitney is a former cricketer and television personality.

- Balmain Benny: The Stormy League Career of Ben Elias (1993).

--- Benny Elias is a Lebanese-born Australian who played rugby league for the Balmain Tigers.

- The Kangaroos: The Saga of Rugby League’s Great Tours (1994)
- Straight Between The Posts: The Legendary Frank Hyde and His Stories (1995).

--- Frank Hyde was an Australian rugby league footballer, coach and radio caller.

- Taylor Made: A Year in the Life of Australia’s Cricket Captain Mark Taylor (1995).

--- Mark Taylor is a former Australian cricketer, Cricket Australia director and television commentator.

- Mark Taylor: Time to Declare. An Autobiography (1999)
- Hard Man: a Life in Football. Noel "Ned" Kelly (1996).

--- Noel Kelly played rugby league for Western Suburbs Magpies, Queensland and Australia.

- Arko: my game. Ken Arthurson (1997).

--- Ken Arthurson was a player, coach and later an administrator at the Manly-Warringah Sea Eagles. He later ran the New South Wales Rugby League, and then the Australian Rugby League during the 1990s' Super League war.

- Nothing Great is Easy: the Des Renford story (2000).

--- Des Renford was an Australian athlete, who took up marathon swimming at the age of 39, and who swam the English Channel 19 times from 19 attempts.

- Ian Thorpe: The Journey (2000).

--- Ian Thorpe is an Australian swimmer who won five Olympic gold medals.

- South Sydney: the Pride of the League. (2000). Lothian.
- The Outsider: Brian Mayfield-Smith. (2000) Macmillan.
- Winning Attitudes. Editor Ian Heads & Geoff Armstrong. Australian Olympic Committee. (2000). Hardie Grant.
- Andrew Ettingshausen. Macmillan (2000)
- Saints: the Legend Lives On: History of the St. George Rugby League Football Club (2001). The St. George Dragons.
- My Story: Louise Sauvage (2002)

--- Louise Sauvage is regarded as the most renowned disabled sportswoman in Australia.

- With Spirit & Courage: the Extraordinary Life of Paul Featherstone (2002).

--- Paul Featherstone is an ambulance paramedic who has been involved in rescue missions following the Thredbo disaster, the Granville Train Disaster, the Bali Bombings, and the Beaconsfield Mine Rescue.

- Jack Gibson The Last Word. Jack Gibson ABC Books. (2003)
- Nova My Story. The Autobiography of Nova Peris ABC Books. (2003)
- Talbot - Nothing but the best. Don Talbot with Kevin Berry Lothian Books. (2003)
- Big Artie: the autobiography, Arthur Beetson (2004).

--- Arthur Beetson was a legendary rugby league player and coach. He was the first Indigenous Australian to captain Australia in any sport.

- Matthew Burke: a rugby life (2005).

--- Matt Burke played in 23 test matches for the Rugby Union Wallabies and then switched to playing Rugby League. Post football he became a volunteer lifeguard, often appearing on Bondi Rescue.

- Warhorse: Life, Football and Other Battles. Shane Webcke. Pan Macmillan, (2006)
- The Golden Girl: Tributes in words and pictures to the legendary Betty Cuthbert (2006).

--- Betty Cuthbert, known as the "Golden Girl", was an Australian athlete and was a four-time Olympic champion.

- From Where The Sun Rises – 100 years of the Sydney Roosters. With G. Armstrong and D. Middleton Playright Publishing Pty Ltd. Caringbah. Australia. (2007)
- A Centenary of Rugby League 1908 – 2008. A Definitive Story of the Game in Australia, With G. Armstrong and D. Middleton Pan Macmillan Australia (2008).
- The Wide World of Ken Sutcliffe (2009).

--- Ken Sutcliffe was an Australian sporting journalist and radio and television personality.

- Hard Road: Thoughts on a tough game. Shane Webcke. Pan Macmillan Australia. (2009)
- And The Crowd Went Wild. Sporting Days that That Thrilled a Nation. With G. Lester. Playright Publishing Pty. Ltd. (2010)
- The Fittler Files: My season on the sidelines. Brad Fittler. Harper-Sport. HarperCollins publishers Australia. (2011)
- The Beach Club - 100 Years at Balmoral 1914-2014. Ian Heads. Playright Publishing Pty Ltd. (2014)
- The Night the Music Died – How a Bunch of Bushies forged Rugby League's Last Great Fairytale (2014)
- Richie - The Man Behind the Legend with Norman Tasker (2015).

---The story of Richie Benaud, the Australian cricketer and commentator.

- The Great Grand Final Heist, Stoke Hill Press (2017).
- Great Australian Sporting Stories: 65 Insider Tales On and Off the Field (2019) Ian Heads and Norm Tasker (2019).
