= Tony Fraser =

Australian general

- Born: November 1958 (age 67); Sydney, New South Wales
- Military career
- Allegiance: Australia
- Branch: Australian Army
- Service years: 1977–2011
- Rank: Major general
- Commands: 16th Brigade (Aviation); 5th Aviation Regiment; 171st Aviation Squadron
- Awards: Officer of the Order of Australia; Conspicuous Service Cross; Officer of the National Order of Merit (France)

Major General Anthony Peter Fraser, AO, CSC (born November 1958) is an Australian public servant and retired Australian Army officer. He was the Deputy Secretary Capability Acquisition and Sustainment Group within the Department of Defence, he held the position from November 2018–August 2022, after being succeeded by Chris Deeble. He was previously the managing director of Airbus Australia Pacific (2015–2018). He retired from the army in 2011 after a 34-year career, his final posting being Head, Helicopter Systems Division within the Defence Materiel Organisation.

== Military career ==
Fraser was born in Sydney in November 1958, and grew up in regional New South Wales. He joined the Australian Army in July 1977 as an aviation cadet and graduated from the Officer Cadet School, Portsea in June 1978.

In 1987–88, Fraser served in Israel and Lebanon with the United Nations Truce Supervision Organization, following which he was awarded a Chief of the General Staff commendation. In 1992 he was awarded the Conspicuous Service Cross.

On promotion to colonel in January 2000, Fraser assumed the appointment of commander 1st Division Aviation, a tenure that included command of the Sydney Olympics Joint Aviation Group. He was appointed a Member of the Order of Australia in 2003 for his service in this role. He was promoted to brigadier in January 2003, and to major general on 25 August 2006. He transitioned from Defence in 2011 and in 2012 was appointed the Head of Region – Australasia with Finmeccanica.

Fraser has 5500 flying hours, mostly on helicopters, and was the first Australian Army pilot to achieve an A1 instructor category. He was appointed an Officer of the Order of Australia in the 2010 Australia Day Honours.

Tony Fraser is married to Shannon and has two adult daughters.
