= Wendy Hoy =

Australian physician

Wendy Hoy FRACP
- Born: Wendy Elizabeth Hoy
- Education: University of Sydney; Royal Australasian College of Physicians (PhD)

Wendy Elizabeth Hoy is an Australian physician who is a Fellow of the Australian Academy of Science (FAA), the Director of the Centre for Chronic Disease at the University of Queensland, Australia, and was appointed an Officer of the Order of Australia (AO) in 2010 and elected as a member of the Australian Academy of Science in 2015. Hoy's research has involved developing new types of kidney imaging and improving health and lives for indigenous populations, in Australia, Sri Lanka and the USA.

== Early life ==
Hoy attended Telopea Park High School, Canberra in Australia, and came first in the Australian Capital Territory, for two subjects, and second in the school. She was awarded first class honours in Immunology (BScMed) and in Medicine and Surgery at the University of Sydney. After twenty years working the US, Hoy subsequently returned to Australia.

== Research interests ==
Hoy specialises in cross-disciplinary research in indigenous health services, as well as kidney and related chronic diseases, and health system modelling. Colleagues have described her work as "transforming the Australian Indigenous Aboriginal health services, as well as decreasing the need for dialysis and developing early interventions across the planet". Hoy's career has changed mortality and related issues within regional Aboriginal communities over the last five decades. Hoy's research also involves measuring how prematurity and low birth weight can influence adult health. Additionally, her research involves factors that lead to kidney disease within African-Americans and Aborigines.

== Career ==
Hoy's work has focused on chronic conditions, including chronic kidney disease in the Indigenous population in Australia, and related diseases. Hoy said "kidney disease was a huge and growing issue in the indigenous community and across the wider population".

Hoy studied three Indigenous and remote communities of Indigenous Australians, and reported that "as people aged the prevalence of chronic conditions including hypertension, renal failure, diabetes and cardiovascular disease also increases". Across her career, Hoy's work has substantially reduced the suffering and improved health outcomes of Indigenous Australians with kidney disease. In addition to working with Indigenous Australian communities, Hoy also has consulted with Sri Lanka and Central American on Chronic Kidney Disease.

== Selected publications ==
As at August 2019, Hoy had over 300 peer-reviewed manuscripts, an H number of 56 and over 13,000 citations.

- M Hughson, AB Farris III, R Douglas-Denton, WE Hoy, JF Bertram (2003) Glomerular number and size in autopsy kidneys: the relationship to birth weight Kidney international 63 (6), 2113-2122
- DC Cattran, GB Appel, LA Hebert, LG Hunsicker, MA Pohl, WE Hoy, ...(2001) Cyclosporine in patients with steroid-resistant membranous nephropathy: a randomized trial Kidney international 59 (4), 1484-1490

== Awards, honours and recognition ==
- 2008 – United States National Kidney Foundation Distinguished Medal.
- 2010 – appointed an Officer of the Order of Australia (AO) in 2010,
- 2014 – Hoy won a $2.5 million Centre of Research Excellence for Chronic Kidney Disease from the NHMRC.
- She was elected to the International Society of Nephrology iNET-CKD core group.
- 2018 – Hoy was the keynote speaker at the Renal Clinical Network Forum.

== Media ==
- Norman Swan of the ABC interviewed Hoy on kidney failure in indigenous communities.
- Hoy's work on indigenous kidney disease, and links between kidney disease, cardiovascular disease and high blood pressure was described by the ABC.
- The Conversation wrote about Hoy's work on kidney disease.
- Methods of providing clean drinking water for indigenous communities, and Hoy's work was covered in The Conversation.
- Hoy's work on the how Australia is failing to close health gaps in Indigenous data gap the Australian Health Survey was also described in the media.
