= Patricia Easteal =

Australian academic (21st century)

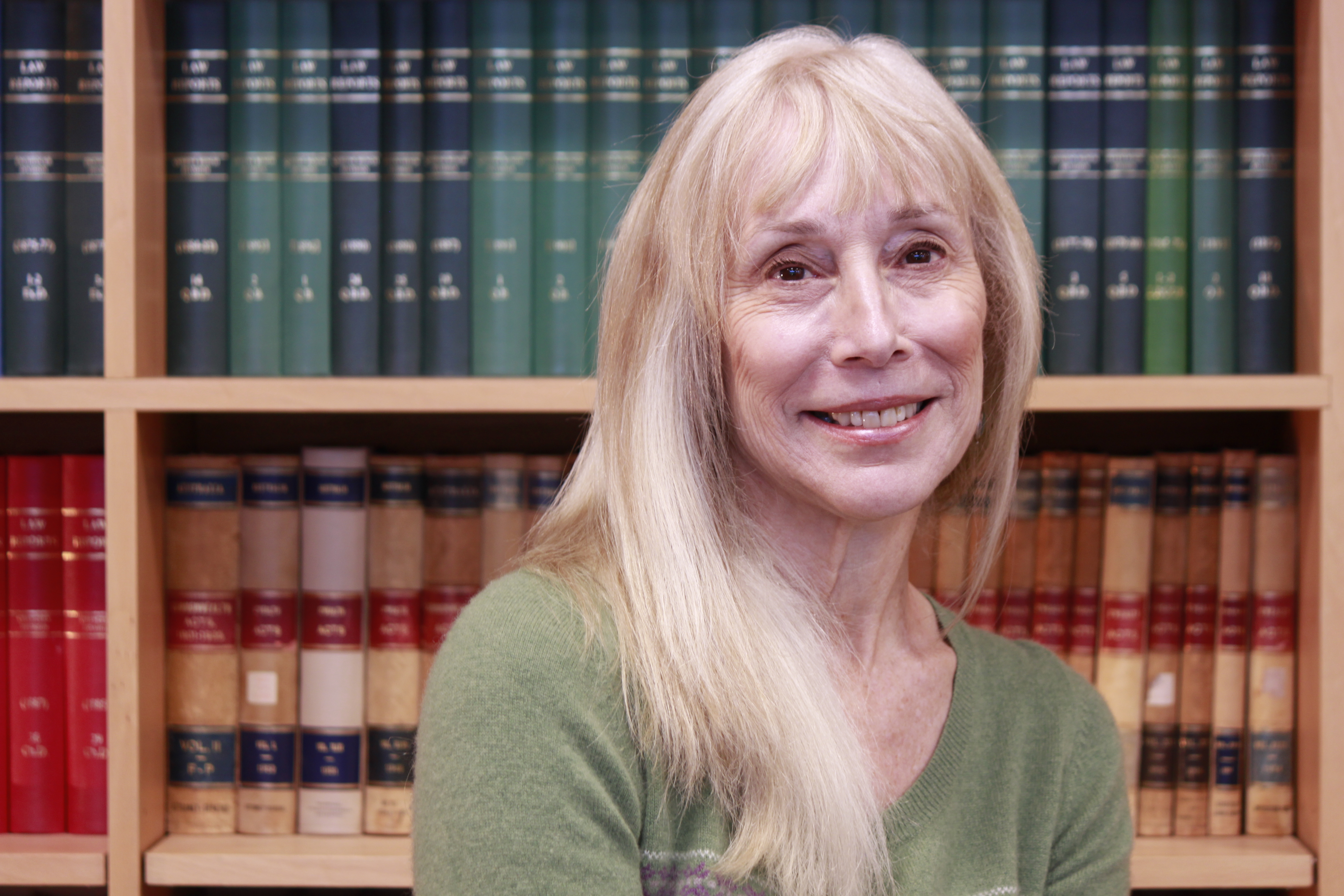
Esteal in 2016

Patricia Lynn Easteal, AM, is an Australian academic, author, activist and advocate. She is best known for her research, publications and teaching in the area of women and the law. In 2010 she was made a Member of the Order of Australia "For service to the community, education and the law through promoting awareness and understanding of violence against women, discrimination and access to justice for minority groups".

== Career ==
Easteal is an emeritus professor at the University of Canberra. She was formerly a visiting scholar at the Australian National University, College of Law. From 1990-1995, Easteal was a Senior Criminologist at the Australian Institute of Criminology. She has published 17 books and over 180 journal articles and book chapters.

Professor Patricia Easteal AM, academic, author, advocate and activist, is a member of the School of Law and Justice at the University of Canberra and has been emeritus professor there since July 2018. She has published 18 books and over 180 journal articles and book chapters. Her research earned her the title of ACT Australian of the Year in 2010 and an Australian Honour ‘for service to the community, education and the law through promoting awareness and understanding of violence against women, discrimination and access to justice for minority groups’. She was also finalist in the Australian Human Rights awards in 2012. In addition, her work as an educator earned Professor Easteal the Australian Learning and Teaching Council Award for Teaching Excellence (2008) and the Carrick Institute Citation for Outstanding Contributions to Student Learning (2007) for effective research-led learning approaches that engage law students in independent and critical inquiry into the complex ties between law, society and access to justice.

In 2018, Easteal launched Legal Light Bulbs, a platform where she publishes content relating to domestic violence and sexual assault research; offering legal education and training, as well as expert court reports.

=== Research ===
Easteal's primary research areas are: rape law; domestic violence and the law; discrimination law; family law; sexual harassment; bullying in the workplace; cyber bullying; and access to justice for women.

She investigates the context of the law and how social structures, language, and values affect the substance and practice of the law, specifically in the areas of criminal law, family law, discrimination law, employment law and immigration law. Important aspects of her research are its applicability to real life issues such as law reform and its nexus with her teaching. She uses a range of empirical methodologies from these disciplines including cross-case comparison, in-depth interviews and surveys.

=== Awards ===
- Finalist - Community Award (Individual) Australian Human Rights Commission, 2012.
- ACT Women's Honour Roll, 2012.
- ACT Australian of the Year, 2010.
- Member of the Order of Australia, 2010.
- Australian Learning and Teaching Council National Award for Teaching Excellence, 2008.
- Carrick Citation, ‘For effective research-led learning approaches that engage law students in independent and critical inquiry into the complex ties between law, society and access to justice’, 2007.
- ACT Woman's Award, 2001.

== Selected works ==
- Bronitt, Simon and Patricia Easteal, Rape Law in Context: Contesting the Scales of Injustice, 2018, The Federation Press: Australia
- Carline, Anna and Patricia Easteal, Domestic and Sexual Violence Against Women- Law Reform and Society: Shades of Grey, 2014, London: Routledge.
- Easteal, Patricia (ed.), Justice Connections, 2013, Newcastle: Cambridge Scholars Press.
- McOrmond-Plummer, Louise, Patricia Easteal and Jennifer Levy-Peck (eds), Intimate Partner Sexual Violence: A Multidisciplinary Approach to Survivor Support and System Change, 2013, London: Jessica Kingsley Publishers.
- Easteal, Patricia (ed.), Women and the Law in Australia, 2010, Sydney: LexisNexis.
- Easteal, Patricia and Louise McOrmond-Plummer, Real Rape, Real Pain: Help for Women Sexually Assaulted by Male Partners, 2006, Melbourne: Hybrid Publishers.
- Easteal, Patricia, Less than Equal: Women and the Australian Legal System, 2001, Sydney: Butterworths.
- Easteal, Patricia (ed.), Balancing the Scales: Rape, Law Reform and Australian Culture, 1998, Sydney: Federation Press.
- Easteal, Patricia, Shattered Dreams, Marital Violence Against Women: The Overseas-born in Australia, 1996, Melbourne: Bureau of Immigration and Multicultural Population Research.
- Easteal, Patricia, Voices of the Survivors, 1994, Melbourne: Spinifex Press.
- Easteal, Patricia, Killing the Beloved: Homicide between Adult Sexual Intimates, 1993, Canberra: Australian Institute of Criminology.
- Easteal, Patricia (ed.), Without Consent: Rape Conference Proceedings, 1993, Canberra: Australian Institute of Criminology.
