= Capability Acquisition and Sustainment Group =

Military materiel organisation within the Australian Department of Defence

Organisation overview
- Formed: 2015
- Preceding Organisation: Defence Materiel Organisation
- Dissolved: 2025
- Jurisdiction: Australian Government
- Headquarters: Canberra, Australia
- Employees: 7000+
- Annual budget: A$17 billion(2020–21)
- Minister responsible: The Hon Pat Conroy (politician) MP
- Organisation executives: Greg Moriarty AO, Secretary of the Department of Defence; Chris Deeble AO CSC, Deputy Secretary Capability Acquisition and Sustainment
- Parent department: Department of Defence
- Website: Defence - CASG

The Capability Acquisition and Sustainment Group (CASG) was an organisation within the Australian Department of Defence, responsible for acquisition, supply chain management, and sustainment of military equipment and materiel including aircraft, ships, vehicles, electronic systems, weapons, ordnance, uniforms and rations for the Australian Defence Force. CASG employed more than 7000 military, civilian and contracted staff in more than 70 locations around Australia and internationally.

CASG was established in June 2015 after the Defence Materiel Organisation was disbanded after recommendations from the First Principles Review.

As of 30 June 2021, Defence through the Capability Acquisition and Sustainment Group (CASG) was managing 161 major projects and 13 minor acquisition projects, at various phases in the Capability Life Cycle, worth a total of $121.6 billion, with an annual acquisition budget was A$9.3 billion. CASG was also managing 109 sustainment products with a total annual budget of A$7.7 billion; for a total annual budget of A$17.0 billion.

On 1 December 2025, Defence minister Richard Marles announced the merger of CASG, Guided Weapons and Explosives Ordnance Group (GWEO), and Naval Shipbuilding and Sustainment Group (NSSG) into the Defence Delivery Group (DDG) from 1 July 2026.

== History ==
Logo of the former Defence Materiel Organisation (2000–2015)

The Defence Materiel Organisation was formed in 2000 when the then Defence Acquisition Organisation merged with Support Command Australia, bringing together the Department of Defence's capital acquisition and logistics organisations into a single entity. The DMO was given responsibility for purchasing, through-life support and disposal of military equipment assets, other than facilities and administrative assets.

In July 2005, DMO became a Prescribed Agency under Australian Financial Management and Accountability legislation, meaning that although it remains a part of the Department of Defence, it was separately accountable to the Minister of Defence for its budget and performance.

DMO's stated vision was to become the leading program management and engineering services organisation in Australia. Its goal was to deliver projects and sustainment on time, on budget and to the required capability, safety and quality.

The DMO budget in 2012–13 was A$9 billion, shared between purchasing new equipment and sustainment and through-life support (maintenance, upgrades, fuels, explosive ordnance and spares).

=== Mortimer review ===
In May 2008, the Australian Government commissioned a review of Defence procurement, which included in its terms of reference a report on the progress of implementing reforms from the last such review – the 2003 Kinnaird Review.

The review was conducted by David Mortimer, who presented his findings in September 2008. Mortimer identified five principal areas of concern. There was/were:

- inadequate project management resources in the Capability Development Group,
- inefficiencies in the processes leading to government approvals for new projects,
- personnel and skill shortages in the DMO,
- delays due to industry capacity and capability, and
- difficulties in the introduction of equipment into full service.

In all, Mortimer made 46 recommendations, with 42 accepted in full by the Government and three accepted in part. One recommendation was not accepted – that the DMO should be separated from the Department of Defence and become an executive agency. This recommendation, which was also made in the 2003 Kinnaird Review, was not implemented by the Howard government. As an executive agency, the DMO would receive its own acquisition funding stream as a government appropriation, and would be headed by a chief executive with "significant private sector and commercial experience". Mortimer also recommended that a general manager Commercial position be created to implement a business-like focus throughout the organisation.

=== Post-Mortimer reforms ===
Ministerial statements in 2010 and 2011 suggested that the Government believed new procurement reforms were needed. On 26 November 2010, the Minister for Defence, Stephen Smith, in adding project AIR 5418 Joint Air to Surface Stand-off Missile (JASSM) to the 'Projects of Concern' list, stated that the listing was because of "our poor management, our failure to keep government properly and fully informed about the project and its difficulties." Minister Smith also said that he had asked Defence to review the effectiveness of its management of major projects. On 6 May 2011 Minister Smith announced further Defence procurement reforms aimed at improving project management, minimising risk at project start and identifying problems early and on 29 June 2011, Minister Smith announced reforms to the management of 'Projects of Concern' including the development of formal remediation plans for designated projects.

=== First Principles Review ===
On 1 April 2015, the Minister for Defence released the First Principles Review. The review recommended that the Defence Materiel Organisation should be disbanded and the transfer of its core responsibilities in relation to capability delivery to a new Capability Acquisition and Sustainment Group, which took effect from 1 July 2015.

The First Principles developed were:

- Clear authorities and accountabilities that align with resources
  - Decision-makers are empowered and held responsible for delivering on strategies and plans within agreed resourcing.
- Outcome orientation
  - Delivering what is required with processes, systems and tools being the ‘means not the end’.
- Simplicity
  - Eliminating complicated and unnecessary structures, processes, systems and tools.
- Focus on core business
  - Defence doing only for itself what no one else can do more effectively and efficiently.
- Professionalism
  - Committed people with the right skills in appropriate jobs
- Timely, contestable advice
  - Using internal and external expertise to provide the best advice so that the outcome is delivered in the most cost-effective and efficient manner.
- Transparency
  - Honest and open behaviour which enables others to know exactly what Defence is doing and why.

The Focus on core business principle led to the contracting of many roles within CASG, and the lowest number of civilian APS staff within Defence.

== Structure ==
Maritime Domain

- Maritime Systems Division
  - Major Surface Ships Branch
  - Specialist Ship Branch
  - Maritime Support Branch
- Submarines Division
- Ships Acquisition Division

Land Domain

- Land Systems Division
  - Integrated Soldier Systems Branch
  - Land Manoeuvre Systems Branch
  - Land Vehicle Systems Branch
  - Explosive Materiel Branch
  - Land Engineering Agency
- Armoured Vehicle Division

Air Domain

- Aerospace Systems Division
  - Airlift and Tanker Systems Branch
  - Aerospace Combat Systems Branch
  - Aerospace Surveillance and Response Branch
  - Joint Strike Fighter
- Rotary, Aerospace and Surveillance Systems Division
  - Air Domain Centre
  - Air and Space Surveillance Control Branch
  - Army Aviation Systems Branch
  - Navy Aviation, Aircrew Training and Commons
  - Navy Army Aviation Acquisition Program Office

Joint Systems Domain

- Joint Systems Division
  - Intelligence, Surveillance, Reconnaissance and Electronic Warfare (ISREW) Branch
  - Joint Command, Control, Communications and Computer Systems (JC4S) Branch
  - Land Command, Control, Communications and Computer Systems (LC4S) Branch
  - Space Systems (SPACE) Branch

Business Management Domain

- Commercial Division
  - Commercial and Financial Analysis Directorate (CFA)
  - Commercial Policy and Practice Directorate (CPP)
  - Materiel Procurement Branch (MPB)
  - Non Materiel Procurement Branch (NMPB)
- Program Performance Division
  - Corporate Performance Branch
  - Business Analysis and Reform Branch
  - Program Management Branch
  - Materiel Logistics Branch
  - Chief Systems Engineering Branch

== Leadership ==
Dr Stephen Gumley was the DMO's chief executive officer from February 2004 until his retirement was announced by the Minister for Defence, Stephen Smith, on 7 July 2011. Gumley had headed an executive team of around 20 senior managers. According to the DMO website, the executive team has considerable private and public sector experience, as well as extensive military domain knowledge.

In March 2009, the Corporate general manager of the DMO, Jane Wolfe, was dismissed for unsatisfactory performance. The Canberra Times reported that its 'senior public service sources' believe she is the highest-ranking Australian Commonwealth public servant to ever have been dismissed for underperformance. Wolfe was reinstated in April 2010 following a legal challenge against procedural aspects of her dismissal in the Federal Court of Australia. The case is said to have "significant implications" for the Senior Executive Service of the Australian Public Service, where legal challenges to performance decisions have been rare.

On 13 February 2012, Warren King (former Deputy CEO) was appointed CEO.

On 31 August 2015, Kim Gillis was appointed Deputy Secretary CASG.

In November 2018, Tony Fraser was appointed Deputy Secretary CASG.

In August 2022, Chris Deeble was appointed Deputy Secretary CASG.

== See also ==
- Defence industry of Australia
