= Julia King (Australian businesswoman) =

Australian businesswoman

Julia Marion King AM is an Australian businesswoman. King was a director at Fairfax Media (she resigned in 2010, after 15 years on the board) and a CEO of Louis Vuitton, Australia (since 1989). She served on the board of Opera Australia.

King was made a Member of the Order of Australia (AM) in the 2010 Australia Day Honours "For service to business through executive roles with a range of organisations, and to the community, particularly as a supporter of arts and charitable bodies".
