= Elyachar Central Library =

Library in Haifa, Israel

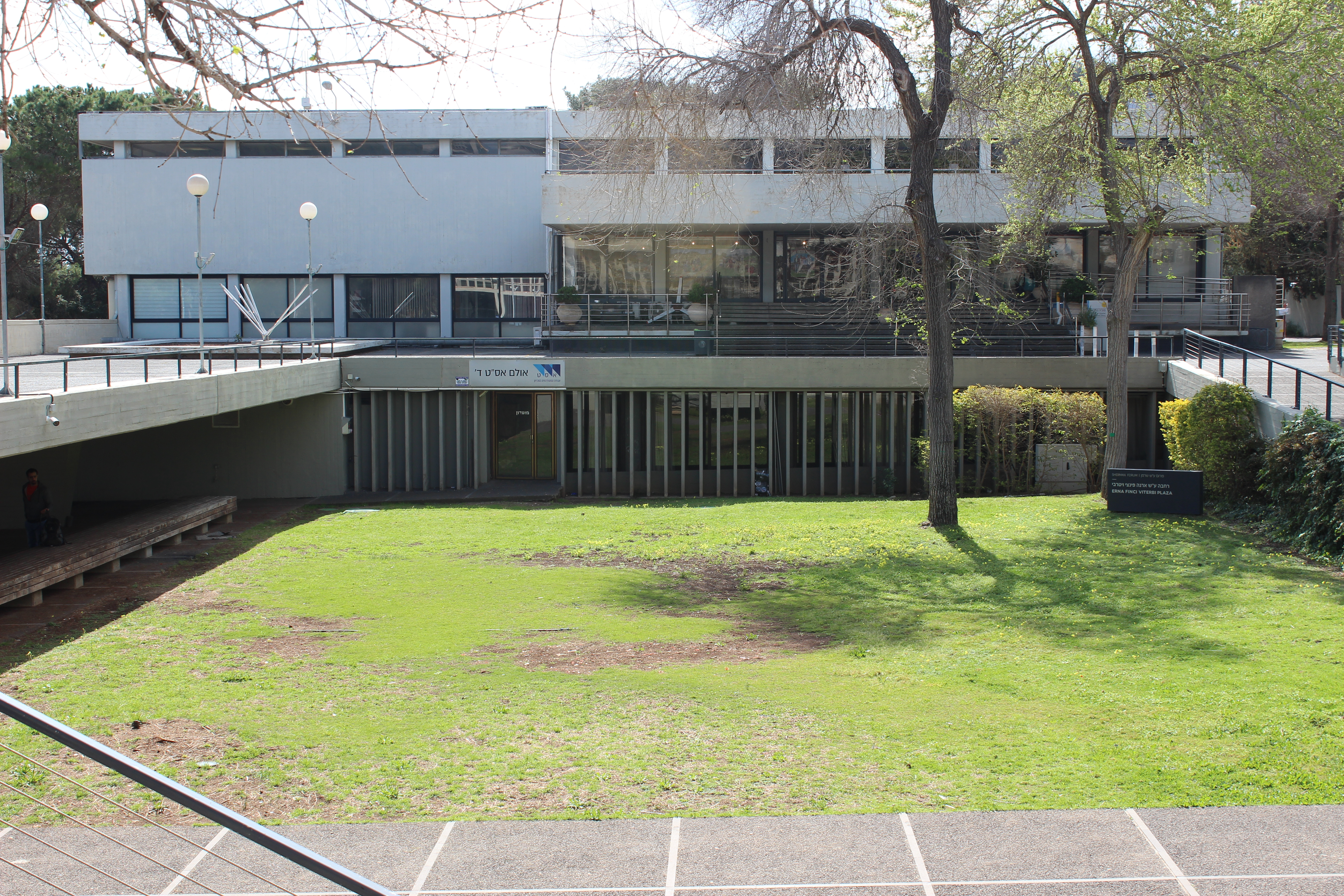
- Frontal view of Elyachar Central Library
- 32.77579°N 35.02250°E
- Location: Haifa, Israel
- Type: Academic
- Established: 1965
- Branches: 15

Access and use
- Population served: Technion's students, faculty and staff

Other information
- Director: Moti Yeger
- Website: Library Homepage

The Elyachar Central Library is the central body in the Technion library system. As such, it has a dual role: to provide an infrastructure for all the Technion libraries and to provide various services to its patrons. The Central Library determines policies and guidelines for all the Technion libraries. The library's building is located in the heart of the Nave-Shaanan Campus in Haifa. Funding for the building was contributed by Colonel Jehiel Elyachar and the library is named after him.

== Background ==
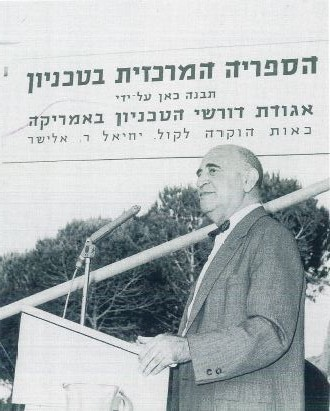
Colonel Jehiel Elyachar speaking at the cornerstone ceremony of the library which is named after him, June 1962

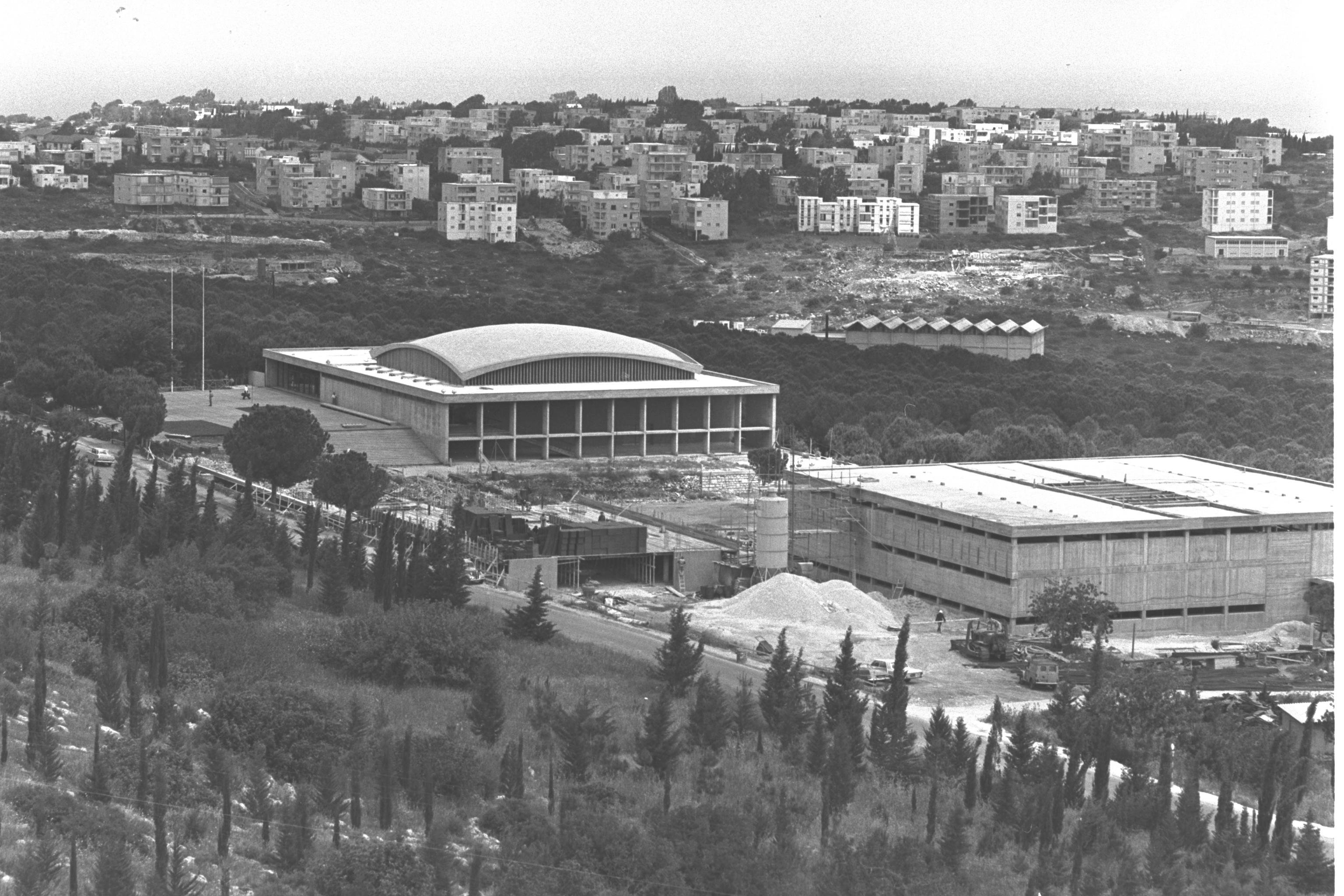
The Library (on the right) during construction next to Churchill Auditorium, 1964

When the Technion was founded in 1924, in Hadar HaCarmel in Haifa, a library was established; it maintained the collections of all the different disciplines studied and researched in the Technion. In the 1950s and 1960s, the majority of the faculties moved from the historic campus to the new campus in the Nave-Shaanan neighborhood. Small research libraries were set up in the new faculty buildings. The original library, which became the central library, continued its acquisition, cataloging, classification and document supply activities for itself and for all the research libraries. In 1965 the present library building was constructed on the new campus. The library was named in honor of Colonel Jehiel Elyachar, who funded the project. Elyachar donated additional funds for an expansion in 1969 and for renovations in 1982.

The building was designed by Arieh Sharon and Benjamin Edelson in the Brutalist architectural style. There are reading halls on three floors and a basement for storage. The reading halls include several study areas and books that are in high demand and used often including textbooks, reference books and literature. The basement archives historical collections and materials that are significant for research. This floor also houses books that are infrequently used, historical journals and the Technion theses collection. The floor includes a special climate controlled room that preserves rare, ancient and precious books. In addition, several historical collections from the second half of The 20th Century, such as a collection of research reports written in the Technion, a collection of study and exercise books produced by the Technion Student Association, a collection of Technion publications, the historical collections of the Technion Construction Department and the Technion Orchestra archive, can be found on this floor. In the library lobby is a gallery that displays temporary artistic exhibits on Technion related subjects. In the future a cafeteria will be opened in the lobby. According to library data, approximately 2000 patrons visit the library daily.

The Central Library serves as an institutional repository for all PhD, MSc and MD theses written in the Technion. Theses written from 2006 through 2015 were deposited in both electronic and print formats and from 2016 only in electronic format. The full text of the theses is available on the Technion's internal network and in the future will be freely available on the internet as well.

The library committee is a formal body appointed by the Technion Senate. Its role is to discuss and advise the Technion administration on the libraries' development policies, their budgets and personnel. The members of the committee are the Senior Executive Vice President, three professors and the Director of the Central Library.

== Central Library Directors ==
- 2019 onward: Moti Yeger
- 2008–2018: Dalia Dolev
- 1979–2008: Dr. Nurit Rothberg
- 1974–1979: Ralf Simon
- 1973–1974: Aaron Kutin (as substitute)
- 1971–1972: Abraham Leiboviz
- 1970–1971: Aaron Kutin (as substitute)
- 1955–1970: Dr. Tunia Goldstein
- 1927–1954: Dr. Rivkah Feiner

== Areas of Activity ==
The Central Library makes policies and provides services for all Technion libraries in the following four fields:

=== Information Technology ===
This field is responsible for the information systems and technological infrastructure used by all Technion libraries.

- The Libraries' web portal – In March 2015 the libraries' web portal was launched to form a unified platform for all the Technion libraries. It includes information about the libraries and provides access to the libraries' information resources. The platform was designed according to the Technion's brand guidelines and it conforms with web accessibility regulations. In 2016, an intranet portal was launched for use by the libraries' Information Specialists personnel.
- Aleph – The Aleph software, developed by Ex Libris Group, has been used by the Technion libraries since 1984 as the main system for the library operations, including circulation, Interlibrary loans, acquisition and budgets, and cataloging and classification. The software was modified to fulfil library needs so that it can provide detailed statistical reports, capture and integrate new collections automatically and assist with digitization. Additional adjustments have been made to provide compatibility with the SAP platform in use by the Technion. In 2017 the library is expected to switch from Aleph software to Ex Libris's Alma, a modern cloud-based Integrated library system.
- Discovery tools – In 2014 VuFind, the open source Google-like discovery tool, which was developed at Villanova University, was put into operation. The tool has been adapted to fulfill the specific needs of the Technion and meets the Technion brand criteria. It is called EasyFind (EZFind) in the Technion. In 2015 EDS (EBSCO Discovery System) of EBSCO was added to the library operating systems. This discovery tool has been integrated into EZFind and is used for searching scientific papers and other scientific materials.
- EasyLink (EZLink) – this product has been developed to provide access options to the library's electronic information resources and to enable scientific journal fulltext access. The product is based on the Ex Libris's SFX software. The product operates from the library's catalog, the databases to which the library is subscribed, citing tools, and even from Google Scholar.
- EasyLibrary (EZLibrary) – this product has been developed to provide access to the library's electronic information resources from outside the campus through digital authentication in the library systems. The product is based on the OCLC's EZproxy software. The product was launched in 2012 and was adjusted in 2015 to allow integration to the Technion libraries' web portal.
- LIBstick – a service for book label editing and printing. It is based on SaaS, accessible via web browsers and was released in June 2019. It was presented in the annual IGeLU 2019 conference in Singapore in August 2019, and received great feedback.

Additional Services and developments:

- access to library services via the Technion's mobile app.
- the BookMe system for the reservation of study spaces in the Technion libraries and in other zones in the campus.
- digitization projects of Technion publications – In 2014 PhD theses which had been deposited in print only were digitized.

=== Patron Services ===
This field is responsible for all services provided to patrons visiting the Technion libraries:

- Circulation Department – The library lends books as well as laptops, earphones, cellphone chargers and calculators for daily use. The department is responsible for maintaining and updating the list of patrons. In 2016 a new service was introduced, allowing patrons to borrow materials in one Technion library and to return loaned items in any of the Technion libraries.
- Interlibrary Loan Department – The department circulates Technion resources to external bodies such as higher education institutions, hospitals and industrial companies in Israel and throughout the world. It also locates and provides information resources for patrons from sources outside the Technion collection. The library and the Younes and Soraya Nazarian Library at Haifa University, have agreed to provide information resources to one another free of charge, when later many libraries in Israel stroke a deal to provide interlibrary loans free of charge
- Reference Department – This department provides instruction and training in the use of library resources and gives reference guidance to patrons. Its operation includes:
  - the provision of group or individual instruction sessions for students, faculty members, laboratory technicians and Technion employees on the library’s databases, discovery tools and information management tools.
  - studying databases and information management tools (such as citation tools, information evaluation tools and bibliographic management tools) and suggesting the implementation of new, relevant ones.
  - updating of the library's web portal and managing the library's social networks.
  - initiating and organizing professional seminars.
  - cooperating with the IT Department to implement new information systems, with the Acquisition Department regarding book collection development, and with other Technion units.
  - other projects, such as the addition of QR codes on printed textbooks to direct to their electronic versions.

=== Management of Collections and Processes ===
This field is responsible for collection development and its access.

- Library acquisitions Department – The department is responsible for collection development through the acquisition of online databases and electronic and printed journals and books. A large part of the acquisitions is made through the Inter-University Center for Digital Information Services (MALMAD) of the Inter-University Computation Center (IUCC). The department also purchases journal archives with perpetual access and e-book packages with either perpetual access or with an annual subscription, as part of the demand-driven acquisition model.
- Cataloging and Classification Department – The department catalogs and classifies all the resources that are purchased or donated, theses submitted in the library and other Technion publications. As of July 2014 materials are cataloged according to the Resource Description and Access (RDA) guidelines, in concordance with the transition of all higher education institutions in Israel from the Anglo-American Cataloguing Rules (AACR2) to RDA. The classification system used is Universal Decimal Classification (UDC). The Faculty of Medicine Library uses Medical Subject Headings (MeSH), a classification system used in the life sciences field.

Additional responsibilities:

- Collection Evaluation – An ongoing project to examine the Technion libraries’ collections with the aim of identifying valuable items to be archived and items to withdraw, according to professional criteria determined in a certain procedure. As the libraries are transforming into learning commons, many collections have been moved to the archive in the Central Library, freeing room for additional learning spaces in the libraries. Collections in high demand and use remain in the libraries. The Central Library sets the guidelines for the evaluation process and the research libraries are responsible for carrying them out.
- Thesis Deposit – Theses that were written in the Technion are deposited in the research libraries; the libraries forward the theses to the Central Library, that retains them and provides access to them. Since 2016 theses are deposited exclusively in electronic format. The Central Library is responsible for outlining the required thesis deposit procedure and for providing the deposit forms.
- Information accessibility – The library assesses methods of access to information resources through the discovery tools it has to improve accessibility.

=== Administration and Logistics ===
This field is responsible for personnel, budgets, logistics and the central library building.

- Budget Department – This department manages the operative budget of the central library as well as the acquisition budgets of all the Technion libraries in coordination with the Acquisitions Department.
- Personnel – professional development of library personnel, personnel recruitment and transfer, organization of professional forums and events.
- The Central Library Building – Maintenance of the building, the equipment and the collections it holds, including the historic archive, the collections archive, the reading halls and the gallery.
- Projects – organizing and directing projects in the Central Library including special events, seminars and public-opinion surveys.
- Collections Archive – an area for long term preservation of collections in nominal use. The library is responsible for receiving collections from the faculty research libraries and withdrawing collections not in use, which are sold or recycled. The archive will be restructured and compact, mobile shelving will be added to increase storage capacity.
- Nessyahu Historical Archive – the Technion historical archive in the Central Library was created and operated by Yehoshua Nessyahu from 1968. In 1979 the archive was named in his memory. Today, the materials in the archive are being digitized as part of the Israel Archives Network Project (IAN Project), a governmental funded Israeli archives digitization project operated by the National Library of Israel. The archive includes:
  - documents, letters, protocols and historical newspaper articles about the creation of a Jewish technology university.
  - a collection donated by the late architect Alexander Baerwald, who designed the historic Technion building and founded the Technion's Architecture and Town Planning faculty.
  - a collection of historic drawings and photographs.
  - a collection of architectural plans made by the architect Prof. Yohanan Ratner that include security elements to protect buildings in the Jewish Yishuv.
  - a collection of maps made by the engineer, architect and geologist Gottlieb Schumacher. The collection includes maps of Haifa, the Land of Israel, neighboring countries and archeological sites within Israel.
