= Library portal =

Digital interface tool

A library portal is an interface to access library resources and services through a single access and management point for users: for example, by combining the circulation and catalog functions of an integrated library system (ILS) with additional tools and facilities.

== Definition ==
A library portal is defined as "a combination of software components that unify the user experience of discovering and accessing information" in contrast to a "single technology" to provide "services that support discovery, access and effective use of information."

== Major elements ==
In addition to the basic functions of access to the library catalog, and a user's subscription records, significant elements of a library portal normally include:

- "Metasearching tools, browsable interfaces, and online reference help", which aid in the discovery process
- Links to full-text articles, OpenURL,
- Interlibrary loan (ILL) or document delivery, for material the library does not own
- Citation management software, user preferences services, "knowledge management tools"

More recently, the focus has been on the discovery goal, which has led to even more difficulties in defining a library portal. The terms "discovery tools", "discovery services", "next-generation discovery tool", and "next-generation OPAC" are often used interchangeably.

== Current market ==
The focus on discovery tools has led to increased competitors in the discovery services market; the competitors that existed in the library portal market have also shifted their focus to this particular function.

A list of competitors in the current library portal market who have recently been awarded contracts by various libraries for their entire portal include :

- Axiell Arena: contract with The University of Gävle
- Axiell Calm: contract with Denmark's Roskilde Libraries for archive management
- BIBIS Library Portal: contract with ROC Mondriaan in The Hague as well as the library of the central bank of the Netherlands, the library of Provincie Zuid-Holland in South Holland, and at Dutch law firm Ploum Lodder Princen.
- ExLibris Primo: contract with Hesburgh Libraries of Notre Dame. Library Technology refers to this "discovery and delivery solution" as a "library portal".
- MetaLib Library Portal, ExLibris: contract with NASA's Johnson Space Center

By contrast, the following list highlights contracts signed by libraries for specific discovery service tools, mostly at more recent dates

- EOS.Web OPAC Discovery, EOS International: while it is unclear which of EOS services were purchased by their clients, the benefits to the EOS.Web OPAC Discovery grew significantly recently when EOS International signed an ILL agreement with the New York Law Institute, which will allow EOS clients to easily request NYLI union catalog items from their EOS.Web OPAC". EOS International's press releases do not specify which service was purchased but only mention the names of new clients.
- Summon, Serials Solutions: contract with University of Texas at Austin Libraries, University of Connecticut Libraries, University of Illinois at Chicago Library, California State University System, Syracuse University Library, University of North Carolina at Chapel Hill Library, Lund University Libraries, Helmut Schmidt University, Peking University, University of the Free State, Cornell University Library, Brown University Library, Kyushu University Library
- Ex Libris Primo and SFX OpenURL: contract with Online Dakota Information Network (Library Technology, March 27, 2012); Silesian University of Technology, Poland;
- EBSCO Discovery Service: contract with Seton Hall University; Massey University Library, New Zealand; Warsaw University, Poland; Bielefeld University, Germany; Bibliothèque nationale de France

== Challenges ==
When building a portal for a library, one of the challenges discussed by Morgan is communication: the building of a portal requires consensus with regards to what should be included. Another challenge is ensuring a user-centered design for the portal. This involves conducting surveys, focus group interviews, and usability studies – all of which can be seen as time-consuming. Additionally, compatibility with the hosting institution is critical. Finally, the question of whether a library should go with open source software or commercial products is always a point of contention.

== Standards ==
There are no accepted standards for library portals. The only standards in the literature are the more general search and retrieval standards, including Z39.50 and ZING (Z39.50-International: Next Generation), the Open Archives Initiative Protocol for Metadata Harvesting, and OpenURL.

As a result of the lack of standards, and since customization is required in a library portal, individual institutions decide what they expect their portal to look like, and what services it will provide. For example, Harvard University is currently conducting a library portal project, which will begin implementation during the summer of 2012. They have identified their own list of criteria, which naturally differs substantially from the needs of other institutions. The various general areas that the committee has looked at include: content, user experience, features and capabilities, infrastructure and security, and search and discovery. It is uncertain which areas will be selected as part of the Phase I implementation of the portal.

== Relationship between OPACs and library portals ==
The online public access catalog (OPAC) is a basic module, part of the library's integrated library system. Earlier, the OPAC has been limited to searching physical texts, and sometimes digital copies but has only limited special features. Caplan argues that they are in process of replacement by newer "discovery tools" allowing more customization. Yang and Hofmann suggest that vendors see money in building either separate discovery tools or Next-Generation OPACs to be purchased as an add-on feature. A problem with vocabulary arises here. Yang and Wagner (2010, in Yang and Hofmann, 2011) refer to discovery tools by many names, including "stand-alone OPAC, discovery layer, and next-generation catalog [sic.]" This contrasts Bair, Boston, and Garrison, who differentiate between next-generation catalogues and web-scale discovery services. Despite any confusion, it is clear that the OPAC as it currently stands is outdated, and will be replaced by more modern, user-friendly tools. The next-generation OPAC as described by Yang and Hofmann will ideally have the following 12 features (although not all features are currently available in any single discovery product):

- Single point of entry for all library resources
- State-of-the-art web interface
- Enriched content
- Faceted navigation
- Simple keyword search box with a link to advanced search on every page
- Relevancy ranking
- Spell-checking
- Recommendations/related materials
- User contribution
- RSS feeds
- Integration with social networking sites
- Persistent links

== See also ==
- Digital information
- Library science
- Web portal
