= Serials Solutions =

Former division of ProQuest

- Company type: ERAMS (e-resource access and management services)
- Founded: 2000
- Headquarters: Seattle, Washington, U.S.

Serials Solutions was a division of ProQuest that provided e-resource access and management services (ERAMS) to libraries. These products enabled librarians to more easily manage electronic resources that serve the needs of their users. Serials Solutions became part of ProQuest Workflow Solutions in 2011 and the "Serials Solutions" name was retired in 2014. In 2015, Proquest acquired Ex Libris Group, a library automation company with many similar products to those of ProQuest Workflow Solutions. The Workflow Solutions division was to be merged with Ex Libris into a new business group called "Ex Libris, a ProQuest Company".

== History ==
Serials Solutions was conceived in 1999 over beers by brothers Steve, Mike, and Peter McCracken after recognizing that providing relief to the frustrations of library patrons in navigating electronic resources was a profitable domain to pursue.

Serials Solutions was incorporated in March 2000. The business grew from a four-man operation run out of the McCrackens' basement to a multimillion-dollar company in the Fremont neighborhood of Seattle, Washington.

During the company's first year of operation, co-founder Peter McCracken worked on this emerging company while simultaneously working full-time as a reference librarian at the University of Washington's Odegaard Undergraduate Library. In 2009 Peter McCracken, then Director of Research, left the company to pursue technology projects related to his lifelong interest in maritime history, namely ShipIndex.org, a vessel researching site.

In 2004, Serials Solutions became a division of ProQuest (Information and Learning division). In 2007, ProQuest Information and Learning was acquired by CSA and the Cambridge Information Group and briefly became ProQuest CSA before the company settled on the original ProQuest name as a "new" brand. As part of the ProQuest-CSA acquisition, Serials Solutions merged with Ulrich's and became the primary retailer of the Ulrich's services Ulrichsweb.com and Ulrich's Serials Analysis System.

In May 2005, Jane Burke, former CEO of Endeavor Information Systems became the head of Serials Solutions. Burke had already led successful library technology ventures. Serials Solutions headquarters was located in the Fremont neighborhood of Seattle.

In 2011 Serials Solutions became part of the ProQuest's new Workflow Solutions division. The "Serials Solutions" name was retired and replaced with the "ProQuest" brand name in 2014.

== Product list ==
- AquaBrowser – Discovery layer that provides a Web interface and single search box for querying the library catalog and other local library collections; also integrates with 360 Search for discovery of the library's subscribed electronic content
- The Summon service – Web-scale discovery service, described as similar to Google but for accessing a library's academic content. It provides a single search box for finding all items in a library's collection including books, electronic resources such as e-books, e-journals and academic databases, multimedia items and other holdings. It executes searches against a database of preharvested content, preferably by indexing the full text, and offers the ability to use facets to refine searches by restricting results to properties such as date range or content type.
- KnowledgeWorks – Repository of bibliographic metadata for electronic journals, books and other e-resources, maintained and managed by Serials Solutions librarians in partnership with publishers, for use with other Serials Solutions services
- 360 Link – Link resolver that accepts data that identifies a particular information resource, typically generated by an Abstracting and Indexing database or discovery service and supplied in OpenURL format, and returns a link to the resource in the library's collection if it is available
- 360 Search – Federated search service that provides a single search facility across multiple separate resources, including individual publisher databases and local holdings in the library catalog; includes the ability to filter to only peer-reviewed journal articles or to only resources for which the library has access to the full text
- 360 MARC Updates – Service that supplies up-to-date MARC records for e-journals and e-books, allowing those resources to be included in the library OPAC without the library staff having to create those records, update and catalog them
- 360 Resource Manager – Electronic resource management system for tracking and managing subscriptions, license terms and holdings data for electronic resources; also available in a Consortium Edition
- 360 Counter – Service that collects statistics about use of electronic resources from publishers, tracks usage over time, and generates reports and cost analyses so libraries can make better-informed decisions about their electronic holdings
- 360 Core – Foundational service that consolidates information about all of a library's electronic holdings, and provides tools for access and management
- Ulrichsweb – Online and searchable access to Ulrich's, recognized as the authoritative source for bibliographic and publisher information on periodicals; a reference used by both library users and librarians, that also facilitates linking to full text of articles
- Ulrich's Serials Analysis System – Analysis and reporting system for assessing a library's serials collection, identifying strengths, weaknesses, and serials that can enhance the collection
- Intota web-scale collection management system aims to address the needs of today's libraries that are still using systems designed for print, while library collections have become increasingly electronic. It has been described as a total reconceptualization of library management systems, addressing the complete resource lifecycle including selection, acquisition, cataloging, discovery and fulfillment. It includes the following elements:
  - Unified workflows for managing all types of library resources
  - A new knowledgebase of authoritative metadata, lowering costs for data acquisition
  - Assessment capability that shows how collections are used, demonstrating the value of the library
  - Interoperability with other systems both inside and outside the library, facilitated through published APIs
- Intota Assessment, a library collection analytics service that is part of the Intota system, debuted in 2013.
