= NASIG =

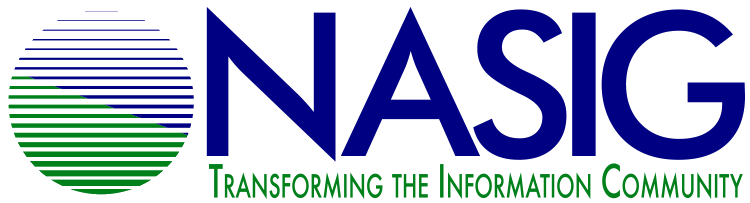
- Founded: 1985
- Purpose: Serials, Electronic resource management, Scholarly communication, Academic publishing
- Location: West Seneca, New York
- Region served: Libraries
- Website: www.nasig.org
- Formerly called: North American Serials Interest Group, Inc.

NASIG (formerly, the North American Serials Interest Group, Inc.) is an independent professional association of librarians and academic publishing professionals, working to advance and transform the management of information resources in all formats and business models, with an emphasis on scholarly communications, serials and electronic resources. Founded in 1985, NASIG is registered in the state of New York as a 501(c)(3) non-profit organization.

== History ==
The North American Serials Interest Group was founded in 1985 after a group of sixteen American librarians attended the 1984 UKSG (United Kingdom Serials Group) conference. One of those librarians, John Riddick from Central Michigan University, took the initiative to form a study group to investigate the feasibility of a North American counterpart. Riddick recruited Becky Lenzini from Faxon to work with him to market the concept of NASIG. They conducted a survey of interest and, in July 1985 held a well-attended and enthusiastic general information at the American Library Association conference in Chicago. Following this meeting, a site selection committee chose Bryn Mawr College to be the site of NASIG’s inaugural conference. An ad-hoc Executive Council was formed in late 1985 to provide temporary structure until the passage of bylaws and elections held.

In January 1986, the group published its first issue of the NASIG Newsletter. The first elections were held in November 1986 and the bylaws were approved that same month.

NASIG was incorporated in January 1988 in the State of New York as a non-profit organization under the name North American Serials Interest Group. Over time, the scope of NASIG expanded beyond serials to include all forms of electronic materials as continuing resources, and more recently, scholarly communications, including libraries as publishers and management of institutional repositories. In 2015, the membership elected to change the name to NASIG, and the legal name change in New York went through the same year.

In 2014, after the death of Birdie MacLennan, NASIG became the new home for the SERIALST listserv. MacLennan worked at the University of Vermont, which had hosted the listserv for over twenty years. After MacLennan passed, the remaining moderators sought a new home for the list—preferably one that was not tied to an individual’s employment—and with its historical focus on serials, NASIG was a good fit.

NASIG’s physical archives have been hosted at the University of Illinois at Urbana–Champaign since 2003.

== Conference ==
The North American Serials Interest Group held its first annual conference in June 1986 at Bryn Mawr College in Bryn Mawr, Pennsylvania. The NASIG conference has been held every year since in various locations in the US and Canada. Conferences are usually held in May or June, and have evolved from a focus on print serials to electronic journals to e-resources in general, more recently moving into scholarly communications. Originally, conferences were held on college campuses, with attendees staying in dormitories. The 2003 conference at Portland State University was the first conference with attendees staying in hotels, and all conference sessions were held on campus. In 2004, NASIG transitioned to housing the full conference in a hotel setting.

During the COVID-19 pandemic in 2020 and 2021 the annual NASIG conference was online and not in person. Starting in 2025 the NASIG annual conference will alternate each year between in-person (even year) and online (odd year).

== Publications ==
NASIG’s annual conference proceedings are published in the Serials Librarian (ISSN 0361-526X) as a double issue each year, with the conference presentation files available on SlideShare. In addition to the proceedings, NASIG publishes NASIG Newsletter (ISSN 1542-3417) on a quarterly basis. NASIG produces a variety of online material, including one blog with job announcements, another with news and announcements, and NASIGuides, short summaries of best practices and industry topics written by NASIG members.

Beginning with the 2022 Conference, The NASIG Conference Proceedings (ISSN: 2995-214X) are published Open Access by Michigan Publishing. The content in the Proceedings is open access and freely available under the Creative Commons license.

The NASIG Newsletter was not published from December 2020 to December 2023.

== Professional Development ==
NASIG works independently and in partnership with other organizations to provide professional development to members, students, and other professionals in the publishing industry and library community.

Approximately four times per year, and sometimes in conjunction with National Information Standards Organization (NISO), NASIG hosts webinars on a variety of information resource management topics such as vendor negotiations, integrated library systems, FRBR, linked data, and the serials crisis.

NASIG created a task force—now called the Student Outreach Committee—to work with library and information science programs accredited by the American Library Association. Serials is often not a topic of focus in many such programs, so NASIG created this sub-group to recruit and encourage future serials librarians. NASIG continues to supplement traditional librarian education with cutting-edge topics through its conference and webinars, in the areas of scholarly communication, serials, and electronic resources.

NASIG annually confers numerous awards for professionals, paraprofessionals, and students within North America in order to assist with funding for attendance to the NASIG Annual Conference. In addition to the annual conference and webinars, NASIG also sponsors local conferences that relate to its mission.

=== Core Competencies ===
As the primary professional organization for serials and electronic resource librarians, NASIG has developed and published the Core Competencies for Electronic Resources Librarians, the Core Competencies for Print Serials Management, and the Core Competencies for Scholarly Communication Librarians. These documents provide a basis both for creating job descriptions in serials, electronic resources, and scholarly communications and for creating library school curricula. They can also be used to define qualities needed by staff working in these areas, as a guide to train new and existing staff (in the case of a library-wide re-organization, for example), and to educate all library staff about the specialized skills needed to work with library resources. The core competencies were created in part by analyzing job advertisements for professional librarian positions and are based on the occurrence of specific descriptors in the responsibilities and qualifications sections of these job advertisements.

The Core Competencies for Electronic Resources Librarians focus and expand upon seven core elements: Life Cycle of E-Resources, Technology, Research and Assessment, Effective Communication, Supervising and Management, Trends and Professional Development, and Personal Qualities

NASIG has also published Core Competencies for Print Serials Management, which came out of discussions about competencies for electronic resources and serials.

The Core Competencies for Scholarly Communication Librarians include four themes common across scholarly communication roles: Background Knowledge, Technical Skills, Outreach and Instruction, and Team Building, as well as Personal Strengths. It also details five potential areas of emphasis to reflect the varying ways that scholarly communication is carried out at different institutions. Those areas are: Institutional Repository Management, Publishing Services, Copyright Services, Data Management Services, and Assessment and Impact Metrics.

== See also ==
- UKSG, formerly the UK Serials Group
