= The Cerebellum =

- Discipline: Neuroscience
- Language: English
- Edited by: Mario Manto

Publication details
- History: 2002-present
- Publisher: Springer Science+Business Media
- Frequency: Quarterly
- Impact factor: 3.847 (2020)

Standard abbreviations
- ISO 4: Cerebellum

Indexing
- CODEN: CERECF
- ISSN: 1473-4222 (print); 1473-4230 (web)
- LCCN: 2003213601
- OCLC no.: 51268235

Links
- Journal homepage; Online access

The Cerebellum is a bi-monthly peer-reviewed scientific journal founded in 2002. The founding editor is Mario Manto. The journal was initially published by Martin Dunitz, followed by Taylor and Francis. It is currently published by Springer Science+Business Media on behalf of the Society for Research on the Cerebellum and Ataxias. It is entirely devoted to research about the cerebellum and its roles in ataxias and other disorders.

== Abstracting and indexing ==
The journal is abstracted and indexed in Academic Search, Chemical Abstracts Service EBSCO databases, BIOBASE, EMBASE, Neuroscience Citation Index, PsycINFO, PubMed/MEDLINE, Science Citation Index Expanded, Scopus, Summon by Serial Solutions, and VINITI. According to the Journal Citation Reports, the journal has a 2020 impact factor of 3.847.
