= OpenURL knowledge base =

Database of books, journals, and their availability

An OpenURL knowledge base is an extensive database containing information about electronic resources such as electronic journals or ebooks and their availability and accessibility. Using the knowledge base, an OpenURL link resolver can determine if an item (article, book etc.) is available electronically and what the appropriate copy for a user is.

The knowledge base helps a library to identify the content they have access to and present it to the users for access. Vendor-maintained knowledge bases seek to offer comprehensive coverage of items that are available to a wider community. As not every institution has access to all content under their individual license agreements the knowledge bases usually offer customization tools to localize its content. Individual institutions can then modify a knowledge base to reflect their local collections, for example, which titles can be accessed electronically by their users; which website provides access to their users; and which resources are owned by the library in print format.

== Contents ==
Information stored include metadata describing individual journals and books, serials title lists available from specific platforms, what years are in the subscription (also called coverage dates) for each title and platform and inbound hyperlink syntax.

== Use ==
The knowledge base is essential in directing the user from a citation to available full text or other services. The link resolver extracts information received in an OpenURL and uses the knowledge base to augment and correct the data and to find services available to this user for this item. If it is available, the knowledge base provides the link resolver with the data needed to create a link to the desired item, ideally to the electronic full text.

OpenURL knowledge bases often have a close relationship with electronic resource management systems (ERMS) as both the link resolver and the ERMS essentially use the same core metadata.

In order for OpenURL linking to be successful in directing users to full text and other services; two components are required. Firstly the OpenURL query must direct the user to the appropriate level of access (be that the article; issue or journal title level for example) using the link server base URL appropriate to the user's institution. Secondly the knowledge base that is queried by the link resolver must reference the appropriate copy of the full text service for that user based on active subscription that their parent institution might hold. This requires the knowledge base to be accurate; up to date; and comprehensive and much time is expended by libraries and link resolver vendors in ensuring the knowledge base satisfies this goal. Both of the above components must be accurate in order to allow end users to discover and access the electronic services they require. This in turn leads to more successful linking to full text which can increase content usage which benefits the whole supply chain for electronic content.

== Challenges ==
To be able to direct the user to the right content and to provide correct information it is essential for a knowledge base that the data is accurate, comprehensive and up to date. Knowledge base vendors usually obtain this information from the publishers, aggregators and other sources in many different shapes and format. In 2006, UKSG commissioned a research report that identified and described issues affecting the efficiency of OpenURL linking. One of the key issues identified was the exchange of metadata in the supply chain and the need for more common formats to aid the transfer of metadata from content providers to link resolver knowledge bases. As a result, in 2008 UKSG and NISO set up a joint initiative called Knowledge Bases and Related Tools (KBART) to make recommendations for the transfer of metadata. The first set of guidelines was published in January 2010 as a NISO Recommended Practice.

One of the key challenges highlighted in this Recommended Practice was the importance of engaging the whole supply chain, including content providers, link resolvers, and libraries, in transferring accurate metadata describing electronic content. It has become increasingly difficult for libraries to manually maintain localized knowledge bases, due to the rapid growth in the availability of subscription and open access electronic publications and the complexity of consortial and institutional subscriptions. As a result, more emphasis is being placed on content provider provision of accurate metadata at its source, to enable link resolver vendors to provide a much more efficient and less labor-intensive knowledge base to libraries. KBART is focusing effort on this area in order to increase uptake of best practice recommendations and embed the recommendations in content provider service provision.

== See also ==
- COinS
