= LibX =

- Developer(s): Virginia Tech
- Initial release: October 13, 2005
- Stable release: 2.0.15861.0 / June 15, 2013; 12 years ago
- Operating system: Cross-platform
- Type: Firefox extension
- License: MPL
- Website: libx.org

LibX was a free, open-source scholars' extension for the Internet Explorer browser (and formerly for Firefox) that lets people use services offered by their library. Users can search their library catalog(s) and databases through a search bar or through a context menu. The context menu is adaptive (changing depending on what the user selected) and configurable (allowing the user to include any configured resource). LibX supports the catalogs of all major vendors. In addition, any resource that can be searched using an http GET request can be included, similar to Firefox's smart keywords.

Resources can also be accessed using auto-generated links for DOIs, ISBNs, ISSNs, and PMIDs. Links are also placed in specific pages, such as book vendor sites or book review sites.

To support off-campus access to resources, users may reload a current page, or follow a link through a proxy server. LibX activates COinS with the library's OpenURL resolver.

LibX supports a "magic search" functionality, which creatively integrates use of the Google Scholar service. LibX searches Scholar, performs a heuristic similarity analysis to determine if a match was found, then redirects the user to the user's OpenURL resolver to obtain an accessible copy.

Librarians, as well as ordinary library users, can create a LibX edition through an AJAX-based web interface, called the LibX Edition Builder. This interface allows anybody to create, edit, maintain, and distribute an edition. As a starting point, users can clone an existing LibX edition and modify it, or start from scratch. The LibX edition builder makes heavy use of auto-detection of resources through global registries such as OCLC WorldCat or OpenSearch. It includes a revision control system for editions and facilities for multiple maintainers to share ownership of an edition. The LibX edition builder was built using the ZK AJAX toolkit, by Tilottama Gaat and Godmar Back.

LibX is produced by Virginia Tech, which hosts customized versions of the extension for over 256 different libraries. Annette Bailey and Godmar Back, the creators of LibX, won the 2007 LITA/Brett Butler Entrepreneurship Award for their work on LibX.

== See also ==
- Zotero
