= Nick Santino =

Nick Santino may refer to:

- Nick Santino (actor)
- Nick Santino (musician)
