= XSight =

XSight (Windows)

- A typical project running on Windows XP.
- Developer: QSR International
- Stable release: 2.0 / 2006 (software abandoned)
- Operating system: Microsoft Windows
- Type: Qualitative Data Analysis Qualitative Research
- License: Proprietary
- Website: http://www.qsrinternational.com

XSight was a software for qualitative data analysis. Its last version was released in 2006, which was supported until January 2014. Developed by QSR International for qualitative data analysis (QDA), it is a tool for researchers or individuals who are undertaking short term qualitative research analysis on projects involving non-numerical data. Qualitative research can encompass business intelligence, marketing research or data analysis. It was superseded by NVivo 10 for Windows, which offers equivalent functionality with greater flexibility and enables researchers to work with more data types likes PDFs, surveys, images, video, audio, web and social media content.

== Description ==
XSight software assists researchers or other professionals working with non-numerical or unstructured data to compile, compare and make sense of their information. It provides a range of analysis frameworks for importing, classifying and arranging data; tools for testing theories and relationships between items; and the ability to visually map and report thoughts and findings.

Designed for rapid analysis, XSight can handle small or large volumes of data and search and query tools support the review and reflection process and users can look for patterns, make comparisons, and interrogate the data in seconds.

== System requirements ==
- 600 MHz Pentium II-compatible processor or faster (1.2 GHz recommended).
- 128 MB RAM (256 MB recommended).
- 800 x 600 screen resolution or higher (1024 x 768 recommended).
- Microsoft Windows 2000 Professional Service Pack 4 or later (Windows XP Service Pack 2 recommended).
- Approximately 300 MB of available hard-disk space.
- Internet connection recommended for software activation.

== Usage ==
XSight is used predominantly by commercial market researchers, but also by professionals and students in a diverse range of areas, from health and law to telecommunications and tourism. It is useful for evaluating a variety of information to review results and draw conclusions. Some examples of uses include tracking customer satisfaction, testing an advertising campaign, researching new packaging or even evaluating information garnered in research such as community consultation projects.

== History ==
- 2004 – XSight 1.1 is first released in April and XSight 1.2 is released in October of the same year.
- 2006 – XSight 2.0 is released
- 2014 – Support for XSight ceased.

== See also ==
- Computer-assisted qualitative data analysis software
- NVivo
