= David W. Bade =

American librarian (1958-)

David W. Bade was a Senior Librarian and Monographic Cataloger at the University of Chicago’s Joseph Regenstein Library until his retirement in 2014. He is the author of the 2002 monograph Khubilai Khan and the Beautiful Princess of Tumapel (a study of the medieval Chinese and old Javanese accounts of the Mongolian invasion of Jawa), several bibliographies on Mongolia and the Mongols, a three-volume catalog of the books in African languages in the Melville J. Herskovits Library of African Studies, Northwestern University, and several books and articles about linguistics, libraries and librarianship, including Responsible Librarianship: Library Policies for Unreliable Systems published in 2008.

In his writings on libraries, Bade’s research focus has been on the “processes of misunderstanding, mystifying and mythologizing technologies and how this allows a technocratic elite to turn convivial tools into tools for control and exploitation.” He has written extensively about cataloging, bibliographic control, authority control, and misinformation, drawing upon the literatures of philosophy, linguistics, rhetoric, ergonomics and resilience engineering in making his arguments.

He is a graduate of the University of Illinois at Urbana–Champaign, where he studied librarianship and linguistics.

== Library policies and misinformation in cataloging ==
Bade is concerned about the degradation of talent and intellectual breadth in the profession of cataloging and the result this has on the accuracy of information in library catalogs. He has written critically of library administrative policies which contribute to the quantity-over-quality mindset in which hiring adequately trained catalogers (particularly those catalogers with subject and language specialty) is not a priority, and about reports such as the 2008 Report of the Library of Congress Working Group on the Future of Bibliographic Control, which he considers to aim at efficiency, not quality. "

== The perfect bibliographic record ==
Related to concerns about library policy is a corollary argument about the purpose and product of bibliographic cataloging. The problems of misinformation in cataloging implies that the opposite, perfect information, is the goal of cataloging. Some have argued (see Intner 1990, Hafter 1986, O’Neill 1996, or Deeken 2005 for examples) that this “perfect record” places an impossible task before the cataloger, and thus catalogers and patrons should be content with some appropriate margin of error (also known as “the imperfect record”).

Yet in this idea of the “perfect record” Bade finds a straw-man argument which attempts to dismiss, by way of this impossible ideal, any real concerns about “adequacy, fitness to purpose, truth, and usefulness” of bibliographic information (p. 129). Instead, bibliographic records can be understood as having contextual integrity, even perfection, where quality is measured according to the purposes and needs of the cataloging system, i.e. the system's functional requirements.

The article in which he develops this argument, "The Perfect Bibliographic Record: Platonic Ideal, Rhetorical Strategy or Nonsense?", won Cataloging and Classification Quarterly’s “Best of” award for the periodical's Volume 46. The awards panel noted that “others could build upon his methodology to attack other myths and straw men within the world of librarianship.”
