= QSR International =

Qualitative research software developer

QSR International, now known as Lumivero, is a qualitative research software developer based in Burlington, Massachusetts, with offices in Australia, Germany, New Zealand, and the United Kingdom. QSR International is the developer of qualitative data analysis (QDA) software products, NVivo, NVivo Server, Interpris and XSight. These are designed to help qualitative researchers organize and analyze non-numerical or unstructured data.

Qualitative research is used to gain insight into people's attitudes, behaviours, value systems, concerns, motivations, aspirations, culture or lifestyles. It is used to inform business decisions, policy formation, communication and research. Focus groups, in-depth interviews, content analysis and semiotics are among the many formal approaches that are used, but qualitative research also involves the analysis of any unstructured material, including customer feedback surveys, reports or media clips.

== History ==
- NUD*IST, which stands for, 'Non-numerical Unstructured Data Indexing, Searching and Theorizing', was first developed by Tom Richards at La Trobe University in Melbourne in 1981 as software to support social research by Lyn Richards. Tom and Lyn Richards went on to form QSR International in 1995.
- QSR released the first version of NVivo, designed to guide researchers from questions to answers, in 1999.
- John Owen became CEO of QSR International in 2001.
- The company released the first edition of XSight, enabling researchers to work through information and get to analysis faster, in 2004.
- In 2005, Professor Lyn Richards' book 'Handling Qualitative Data: A practical guide' was first published.
- In 2006, QSR International became a Microsoft Gold Partner and released NVivo 7 and XSight 2.0. XSight 2.0 was incorporated into the syllabuses of Australia's Victoria University and Malaysia's Sunway University College. In the same year, XSight was also incorporated into the syllabus of the University of Southhamption's new MSc Marketing Analytics degree.
- In 2007 QSR partnered with Hulinks to deliver NVivo 7 in Japanese - the first Japanese qualitative research software. In the same year, Dr. Patricia Bazely's book, Qualitative Data Analysis with NVivo was first published.
- QSR released NVivo 8 in March 2008 and in August 2008 released Simplified Chinese and Spanish versions of NVivo 8. A Japanese version of NVivo 8 followed in November of the same year. French- and German-language versions of NVivo 8 were released in April 2009.
- In 2009 the second edition of Professor Lyn Richards' text, 'Handling Qualitative Data: A practical guide' was published.
- In 2010 QSR released NVivo 9 and NVivo Server 9.
- In 2011 QSR released an update to NVivo 9 featuring five new languages: Spanish, French, German, Portuguese and Simplified Chinese. A separate Japanese-language version of NVivo 9 was made available too. The release also included new support for Framework analysis, a research methodology developed by the National Centre for Social Research (NatCen).
- In 2012 QSR released NVivo 10 giving users new ability to capture and analyze web and social media data.
- In 2013 NVivo 10 was released in French, German, Portuguese, Spanish and Simplified Chinese. A separate Japanese version is also released.
- In September 2013 QSR International announced a partnership with SurveyMonkey.
- In March 2014 QSR International announced a partnership with TranscribeMe.
- In March 2014 QSR International released NVivo for Mac Beta, the first true Mac application for qualitative data analysis.
- In June 2014 QSR International released NVivo for Mac commercially.
- In September 2014 an update for NVivo for Mac was released. This allows users the ability to capture and import web pages using NCapture, run matrix coding queries and use text-to-speech options.
- In September 2014 QSR International released NVivo 10 for Windows, Service Pack 6 making it easier to work with content from Evernote and provides improved functionality for project recovery.
- Kerri Lee Sinclair became CEO in September 2015.
- In September 2015, QSR International released groundbreaking new software for qualitative data analysis. NVivo 11 for Windows now comes in three editions, plus new releases of NVivo for Mac and NVivo for Teams.
- In March 2016 Chris Astle became CEO of QSR International.
- In September 2017, QSR International released a new product, Interpris which lets users sort and analyse qualitative survey data.
- In March 2018, QSR International released NVivo 12 (Windows) and NVivo 12 (Mac) offering new mixed methods support.
- In February 2021, QSR International bought Swiss Academic Software, the developer of Citavi, a software for reference management and knowledge organization.
- In 2022, with the financial backing of TA Associates (a private equity firm), QSR International joined forces with two partners, Palisade and Addinsoft, to found Lumivero, a new data analytics software platform.

== Scale of operation ==
QSR International is headquartered in Burlington, Massachusetts, and has offices in Australia, Germany, New Zealand, and the United Kingdom. The company also has a global network of resellers and trainers.

== Products ==
NVivo is a qualitative data analysis (QDA) software package that was first released in 1999. NVivo allows users to import, sort and analyze data like web pages and social media, audio files, spread sheets, databases, digital photos, documents, PDFs, bibliographical data, rich text and plain text documents. Users can interchange data with applications like Microsoft Excel, Microsoft Word, IBM SPSS Statistics, EndNote, Microsoft OneNote, SurveyMonkey and Evernote. NVivo is multi-lingual and can be used in English, French, German, Japanese, Chinese, Portuguese and Spanish. Users can order transcripts of media files from within NVivo 10, 11 and 12 (Windows) using TranscribeMe in English, Chinese, French, German, Japanese, Portuguese and Spanish. NVivo for Windows also allows users to perform text analysis and create visualizations of their data. The software is certified for use with Microsoft's Windows 7, Windows 8, Windows 8.1 and Windows 10 operating system.

NVivo for Mac was released in June 2014. It can be used to analyze interviews, focus group discussions, web pages, social media data, observations and literature reviews and enables researchers to work with content from documents, PDFs, audio and video.

NVivo for Teams (NVivo Server) is designed to let users analyze and manage NVivo projects centrally so teams can work together in the same project at the same time.

XSight software was released in 2006 and supported until January 2014. It was software for commercial market researchers or those undertaking short term qualitative research projects. NVivo 12 (Windows) software offers equivalent functionality, with greater flexibility and enables researchers to work with more data types including PDFs, surveys, images, video, audio, web and social media content.

Interpris is a software that is intended to help users import, sort and analyse survey data from Survey Monkey, a Microsoft Excel workbook, or uploaded from a .CSV file.

Citavi is a software for reference management and knowledge organization, originally developed by Swiss Academic Software GmbH in Wädenswil, Switzerland.

== Evolution of qualitative data analysis software ==
The first generation of computer-assisted qualitative data analysis (QDA) software emerged in the mid to late 1980s and involved basic word processors and databases with a focus on data management. The programs were designed to help qualitative researchers manage unstructured information like open-ended surveys, focus groups, field notes or interviews.

Second generation QDA software introduced functions for coding text and for manipulating, searching and reporting on the coded text. The approach of employing software tools for qualitative analysis was initially developed in the social sciences arena but is now used in an extensive range of other disciplines.

The third generation of QDA software goes beyond manipulating, searching and reporting on coded text. It assists actual analysis of the data by providing tools to help researchers examine relationships in the data and assist in the development of theories and in testing hypotheses. Some software supports rich text, diagrams and the incorporation of images, movies and other multimedia data. Other programs have tools that enable the exchange of data and analyses between researchers working together collaboratively.
