= 1 Lincoln Plaza =

Residential skyscraper in Manhattan, New York

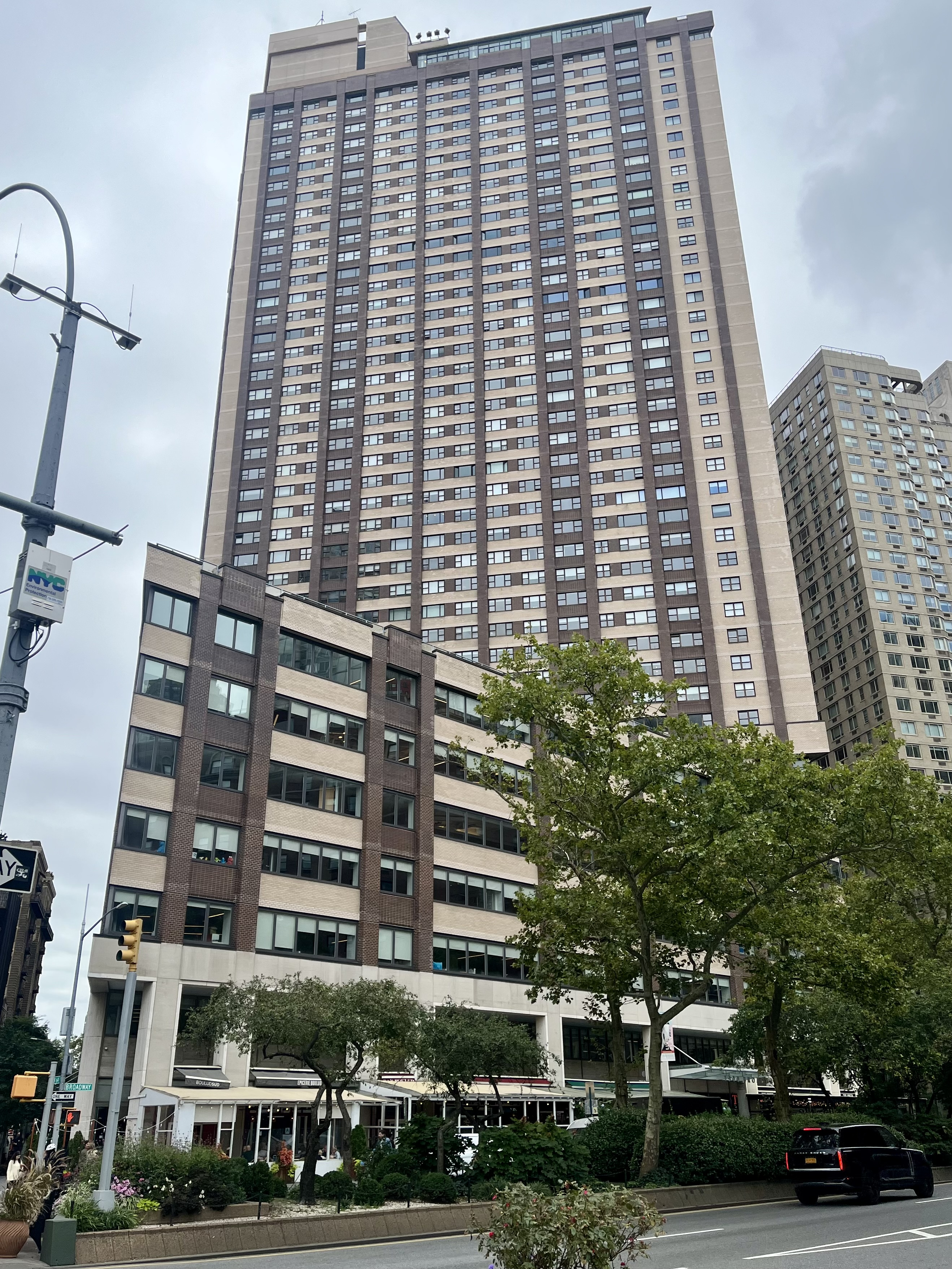
- The building viewed from Broadway in 2024
- Interactive map of the 1 Lincoln Plaza area

General information
- Type: Residential
- Location: 20 West 64th Street; Manhattan, New York 10023; United States
- Coordinates: 40.77152°N 73.9809°W
- Construction started: 1971
- Completed: 1974

Height
- Height: 490 ft (149.4 m)
- Top floor: 44

Technical details
- Floor count: 43
- Lifts/elevators: 8

Design and construction
- Architect: Philip Birnbaum

Other information
- Number of units: 671

1 Lincoln Plaza is a mixed-use, commercial and luxury residential condominium building in Lincoln Square, Manhattan, New York City, with 43 floors and 671 units. Construction began in 1971. Completed and ready for occupancy in 1974, the building is divided into eight floors of commercial space and 36 floors of luxury residential apartments. The roof, which is often considered the 44th floor, is home to the building's private fitness club called Top of the One.

== Usage ==
A five-story residential building at 33 West 63rd Street, a tenement constructed in the 1890s owned by Jehiel R. Elyachar, became the target of an effort by Paul Milstein to assemble a group of properties that would become the site of 1 Lincoln Plaza. After lengthy negotiations, Milstein and Elyachar had agreed to a deal in which Milstein would acquire the property for cash, and then agreed to an exchange for a building on the Upper East Side. Though a verbal agreement had been reached, Elyachar insisted that a donation of $100,000 be made to one of the charitable organizations he supported, at which point Milstein walked away and said "You know what, you're going to keep your building". Howard Milstein, Paul's son, called the negotiations as being "among the most glaring examples of someone who overplayed their hand". The surrounding buildings on the site were demolished and 1 Lincoln Plaza was constructed around Elyachar's building at 33 West 63rd Street.

The building has multiple addresses other than "1 Lincoln Plaza", including 20 West 64th Street, 33 West 63rd Street, 1897 Broadway, and 1900 Broadway. Provided a unit number is included, any mail sent to any of the above addresses will reach the required tenant.

The building also has commercial tenants. These have included three prominent entities in the entertainment industry: Sesame Workshop (which makes Sesame Street), SAG-AFTRA, and the American Society of Composers, Authors and Publishers (ASCAP); the headquarters of ASCAP were located at One Lincoln Plaza from 1974 until 2018.

== Notable residents ==
In January 2012, actor Nick Santino, a resident, killed himself soon after euthanizing his pit bull Rocco, due to pressure from what some neighbors told the press was harassment by building management.

== In popular culture ==
The building can be seen in almost any scene that was filmed in the plaza at Lincoln Center after 1971, including Ghostbusters.
