= LIBstick =

- Developer(s): Technion Libraries Information System Team
- Initial release: June 2019
- Written in: PHP, JavaScript, HTML, CSS and the Materialize framework of CSS
- Operating system: any web browser with best operability in Google Chrome
- Platform: WordPress
- Type: Open source
- Website: https://libraries.technion.ac.il/libstick

LIBstick (library + sticking) is a label printing tool which is intended for libraries to create, edit and print book labels, such as spine labels, in an easy, quick and straightforward way. The tool is based on SaaS and is accessible via web browsers with no need for software installation. It is made to extract data from an integrated library system (ILS), such as Ex Libris's Alma, for the automatic creation of labels. It was developed and is maintained in the Technion libraries, in Haifa, Israel.

== Background ==
After replacing Ex Libris's Aleph ILS software with the company's Alma cloud-based ILS in December 2017 the Technion Libraries started using SpineOMatic to produce book spine labels. Due to usability issues and the lack of edit options in SpineOMatic, and compatibility issues between Alma and the previous label printing software that was used at the Technion while using Aleph, the Technion Libraries IS Team developed a simple XML based solution.

There are 15 Libraries in the Technion, each with its own label printing format. Due to this diversity the XML solution was added with additional functionality and with the template design studio, which led to the creation of LIBstick and its release in June 2019.

== Functionality ==
A screen capture of LIBstick showing the main menu on the left pane and an edited label template on the right pane, filled with the first two rows

LIBstick consists of a main menu pane on the left and a board pane on the right, where labels are prepared for printing. The board contains a template, which is a grid of a certain number of rows and columns to match a sheet of labels to print on. The labels in a given template contain fields which are automatically filled in with data extracted from an ILS, such as Alma. The data extraction is executed by scanning an item's barcode, or typing it in. Each field is defined to contain a certain piece of information about the item such as call number, barcode, volume number, edition statement, public note, and more, according to the template's predefinitions. LIBstick is mainly designed to extract data from Alma, but it is also compatible with Aleph.

Various templates can be set up and in each template various fields for the labels can be defined according to the library's needs. It is possible to define, in each template, how each field in the labels would appear according to font, size and color. The paper type for printing is also defined by the template. Switching between templates is also possible during editing. When doing so the format of the labels in a selected template changes according to the newly selected template's settings. Templates can be edited, saved, duplicated, renamed and deleted.

The data in each field in a label can be edited. They can be fully or partially replaced, added or erased as users see fit. Besides editing, labels can be repositioned within the template, duplicated and deleted.

LIBstick defines three user roles: Manager, Designer and Maker. Each role has its own privileges including all the privileges of the following roles in the list. The Managers act as admins with all privileges. Their own privileges include role assignments to users and setting API keys. The Designers can design templates, share their templates within their institution, upload new fonts and logos, and manage papers. The Makers can manage their own profiles and edit and print out labels.

LIBstick uses the following technologies: MaterializeCSS, jQuery, JavaScript, HTML, CSS, PHP, WordPress (CMS), MySQL, JSON, AJAX, RESTful API.

== Exposure ==
The service is in use by several libraries at the Technion, several Israeli universities and is in different stages of implementation in institutions worldwide, including in United States, UK, Hong Kong, Austria and Australia.

In late August 2019 LIBstick was presented in the Annual IGeLU 2019 Conference in Singapore and received great exposure and positive feedback.

LIBstick is the default label printing solution for Alma as stated in the official documentations of Ex Libris.

Since 2023 LIBstick provides services to FOLIO and Koha.
