= Jehiel R. Elyachar =

Israeli-American engineer, real estate developer and philanthropist

Jehiel Raphael Elyachar
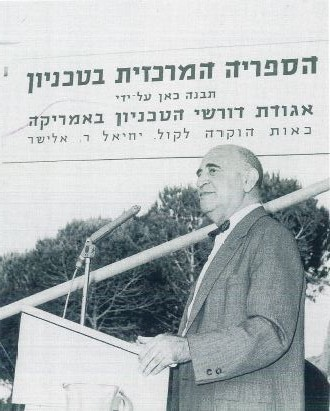
- Colonel Elyachar addresses the audience at the cornerstone ceremony for the Elyachar Central Library, Technion, June 1962
- Born: October 20, 1898; Jerusalem, Israel
- Died: March 29, 1989 (aged 90); Bellevue Hospital Center; Manhattan, New York City, United States
- Education: University of Paris
- Title: Colonel

Jehiel Raphael Elyachar (October 20, 1898 – March 29, 1989) was an engineer, real estate developer and philanthropist who contributed to American and Israeli causes. He distinguished himself during World War II as a colonel in charge of military intelligence for the United States Army, earning the Bronze Star Medal, the Legion of Merit, and the Légion d'honneur.

== Biography ==
Elyachar was born on October 20, 1898, in Jerusalem, then part of the Ottoman Empire.

He was educated as an engineer in Paris before emigrating to the United States in 1928. He established the Straight Construction Corporation and built his business by managing foreclosed properties he had bought from banks during the Great Depression.

Elyachar enlisted in the United States Army during World War II as a private, advancing to the rank of colonel in charge of military intelligence for General Dwight D. Eisenhower. His engineering skills came into play in the construction of vital railroad bridges that helped clear the way for General George S. Patton's Third Army tanks to advance into Nazi Germany. For his service, Elyachar earned the Bronze Star Medal and the Legion of Merit in recognition of his building "the foundation of modern military intelligence" during the war. He was also awarded the Légion d'honneur from the French government. He later served as an adviser to President Dwight D. Eisenhower.

== Real estate ==
He resumed his real estate business after completing his military service, buying and building commercial and residential buildings, primarily in Manhattan. Eventually he built a portfolio that was worth as much as $100 million.

A five-story residential building which he owned at 33 West 63rd Street, a tenement constructed in the 1890s, became the target of an effort by Paul Milstein to assemble a group of properties that would become the site of 1 Lincoln Plaza, a 43-story building that had both offices and apartments. After lengthy haggling, a deal fell apart. The surrounding buildings on the site were demolished and 1 Lincoln Plaza was constructed around Elyachar's building at 33 West 63rd Street. A resident of 33 West 63rd said that the building "sticks out like a sore thumb, or a finger — which is probably what the colonel had in mind".

== Legacy ==
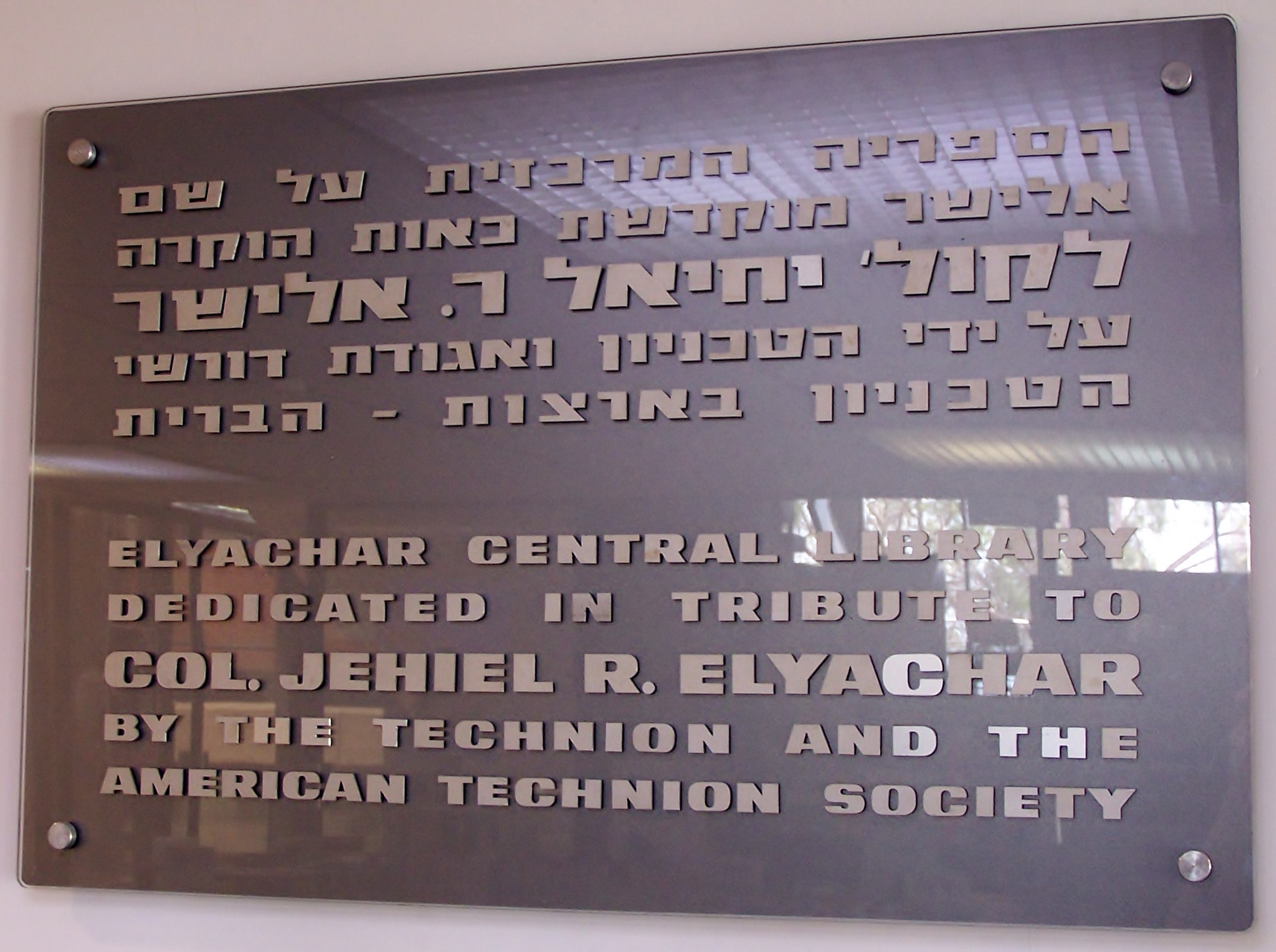
A commemorative plaque for Elyachar in the Technion's Central Library, which bears his name

Since the 1950s Elyachar started contributing to American and Israeli causes. He was the founder and president of the American Society for Technion, an organization created to assist the Technion – Israel Institute of Technology, the largest technical education university in Israel. He was elected by the Board of Governors at the Technion to serve as honorary president of the Society after serving three times as president in the Society. He donated funds for scholarships for Technion students and for the building of the Central Library of the Technion, which was accomplished in 1965 when the library moved from the old building in Hadar HaCarmel to the new campus in Neve Shanan in Haifa. Therefore the library is named after him.

He endowed a chair in Sephardic studies at Yeshiva University and donated to the school his collection of Judaica in the Spanish language and Ladino, the largest such collection in the United States. He was also one of the founders of the Albert Einstein College of Medicine of Yeshiva University.

== Family ==
Elyachar had twin sons, Ralph and Daniel, and a daughter, Ruth, by his first wife, Jean (née Rosenblatt), who died in 1972. He remarried to Anna Tulin.

By 1987, Elyachar and his twin sons were not on speaking terms. He came into conflict with his sons over the disposition of a group of four properties that he owned in Manhattan, where Elyachar had variously given and retracted partial ownership of the buildings to his sons and daughter. Elyachar insisted that he retained ownership of the properties and sought to donate the buildings to the charitable causes he supported, while his sons claimed that they were part owners of the buildings, which they wanted to redevelop or convert to cooperatives. At that time, the properties were fully depreciated and earned more than $3 million in revenue, with annual profits of at least $1.5 million, according to documents filed in state and Federal courts.

A resident of Manhattan, Elyachar died of a heart attack at the age 90 on March 29, 1989, at Bellevue Hospital Center. He was survived by his second wife, Anna Tulin. He was also survived by a daughter and two sons from his first marriage, along with 12 grandchildren and 10 great-grandchildren.

By 2012, three of the properties owned by Elyachar since 1929 were managed by Elyachar Properties, a company in which the Elyachar's grandchildren play a major role. The properties are: Gerel at 1100 Madison Avenue, Ruradan at 8 East 48th Street, and Timston at 250 East 39th Street.
