= Bibliographic record =

Metadata describing a particular resource

A bibliographic record is an entry in a bibliographic index (or a library catalog) which represents and describes a specific resource. A bibliographic record contains the data elements necessary to help users identify and retrieve that resource, as well as additional supporting information, presented in a formalized bibliographic format. Additional information may support particular database functions such as search, or browse (e.g., by keywords), or may provide fuller presentation of the content item (e.g., the article's abstract).

Bibliographic records are usually retrievable from bibliographic indexes (e.g., contemporary bibliographic databases) by author, title, index term, or keyword. Bibliographic records can also be referred to as surrogate records or metadata. Bibliographic records can represent a wide variety of published contents, including traditional paper, digitized, or born-digital publications. The process of creation, exchange, and preservation of bibliographic records are parts of a larger process, called bibliographic control.

== History ==
The earliest known bibliographic records come from the catalogues (written in cuneiform script on clay tablets) of religious texts from 2000 B.C., that were identified by what appear to be key words in Sumerian. In ancient Greece, Callimachus of Cyrene recorded bibliographic records on 120 scrolls using a system called pinakes.

Early American library catalogs in the colonial period were typically made available in book form, either manuscript or printed. In modern America, the title and author of a work were enough to distinguish it among others and order its record within a collection. However, as more and different kinds of resources arose, it became necessary to collect more information to distinguish them from one another. This conceptual framework of the bibliographic record as a collection of data elements served American librarianship well in its first one-hundred years. Challenges to the current method have arisen in the form of new and different distribution methods, especially of the digital variety, and raise questions about whether the traditional conceptual model is still relevant and applicable.

== Formats ==
Today's bibliographic record formats originate from the times of the traditional paper-based isolated libraries, their self-contained collections and their corresponding library cataloguing systems. The modern formats, while reflecting this heritage in their structure, are machine-readable and most commonly conform to the MARC standards. The subject bibliography databases (such as Chemical Abstracts, Medline, PsycInfo, or Web of Science) do not use the same kinds of bibliographical standards as does the library community. In this context, the Common Communication Format is the best known standard.

In 2011, the Library of Congress began development of BIBFRAME, a RDF schema for expressing bibliographic data as a successor to MARC 21. BIBFRAME matured to version 2.0 in 2016, and will serve as the basis of cataloging in the Library of Congress' transition from its Voyager ILS to FOLIO. The system is expected to be live in Summer 2025. Following suit, BIBFRAME is being adopted by many other library systems such as Columbia University Libraries, Stanford University Libraries, Cornell University Library, University of Illinois Urbana-Champaign University Library, National Széchényi Library, and the Engineer Research and Development Center Library.

BIBFRAME is particularly noteworthy because it describes resources using a number of different entities and relationships, unlike standard library records, which aggregate many types of information into a single independently understandable record.

The digital catalog of the National Library of France has the peculiarity to report notes about access and restrictions as well as the physical collocation of any single paper copy of each title, that exists in one of the libraries associated to their keeping system. This set of metadata allows to enforce the long-term digital preservation and content availability.
