= Jerry Kline =

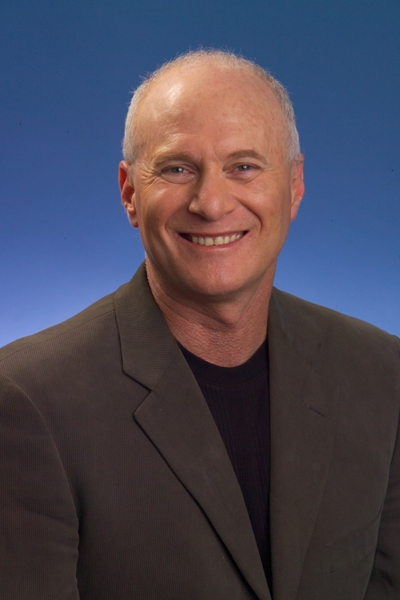
- Born: 1951 (age 74–75); Los Angeles, California, U.S.
- Education: University of California, Berkeley
- Occupations: Engineer, businessman

Jerry Kline is the founder and former chairman of Innovative Interfaces and SkyRiver Technology Solutions, both based in Emeryville, California, USA.

== Personal life ==
Kline was born in 1951 in Los Angeles, California. He received a B.S. degree in electrical engineering and computer science from the University of California, Berkeley in 1974.

Kline resides in Berkeley, California with his wife. They have 3 children and 7 grandchildren.

== Career ==
Kline began his career designing and developing software at the UC Berkeley Library, where he worked from 1973 to 1978.

Kline co-founded Innovative Interfaces, Inc., a provider of integrated library system software, in 1978 and began building the company in the spare bedroom of his home. Innovative's first product was a "black box" interface that allowed libraries to download OCLC bibliographic records in the CLSI circulation system without re-keying — a system considered revolutionary at the time.

During Kline's tenure, Innovative has produced a series of library technology offerings. These included the INNOVACQ Acquisitions and Serials System (1981), the INN-Reach Consortial Borrowing System (1993), Millennium Integrated Library System (1999), and the Sierra Services Platform (2010). Kline also founded and launched Sky River Technology Solutions, a bibliographic utility, in 2010.

In February 2012 Kline sold Innovative Interfaces and SkyRiver Technology Solutions to Huntsman Gay Global Capital and JMI Equity. He left the companies at the end of that year.

The Gerald M. Kline Family Foundation, created in 1999, marked the beginning of Kline's philanthropic activities. The Foundation has donated to various organizations pertaining to libraries, education, food, public health, housing and environmental issues. Among the current initiatives undertaken by the Foundation are the Jerry Kline Community Impact Prize for public libraries and the John H. Francis Polytechnic High School Scholarships, enabling graduating seniors to attend college.
