= Lyn Richards =

Australian social scientist

- Education: La Trobe University
- Scientific career
- Workplaces: La Trobe University
- Thesis: Migrants in the DLP : a study of the involvement of a group of migrants in the Democratic Labor Party in Victoria (1971)

Marilyn Gray Richards (born 1944) is an Australian social scientist and writer who, with computer scientist Tom Richards, developed the software analysis packages NUD*IST and NVivo.

== Early life and education ==
Richards was born as the second daughter to Tim Marshall – head of the Division of Soils at Commonwealth Scientific and Industrial Research Organisation (CSIRO) – and Ann Nicholls, who lectured at the Geography Department at the University of Adelaide. Her older sister is Jenny Graves.

Richards studied political science and sociology at La Trobe University. Her early research considered the involvement of migrants in the Democratic Labour Party.

== Research and career ==
Richards was appointed to the faculty at La Trobe University, where she worked on family sociology. She looked at the relationships between family life and home ownership in Australia. She identified that as families aspired to suburban living, they spent less times in the homes they worked so hard to finance.

Richards became aware that her academic research needed more sophisticated data analysis tools, and started to work with Tom Richards on the development of quantitative analysis software. She left La Trobe University and launched QSR International, a software development company.

At QSR International, Richards created the software packages NUD*IST and NVivo.

=== Selected publications ===
- Richards, Tom; Richards, Lyn (1991). "The NUDIST qualitative data analysis system". Qualitative Sociology. 14 (4): 307–324. doi:10.1007/bf00989643. ISSN 0162-0436. S2CID 144274985.
- Richards, Lyn (1999). Using NVIVO in Qualitative Research. SAGE. ISBN 9780761965244.
- Richards, Lyn (2000). The Nvivo Qualitative Project Book. SAGE. ISBN 9781847871022.
- Richards, Lyn (2005). Handling Qualitative Data: A Practical Guide. SAGE. ISBN 9780761942597.

== Personal life ==
Richards is married to computer scientist Tom Richards.
