= E-resource access and management services =

Library e-resource management services

ERAMS (e-resource access and management services) are a way of thinking about library management to help libraries optimize the access, usage, data, and workflows of electronic library collections in the physical and digital library.

== Background ==
Electronic resources, particularly electronic journals and ebooks, can be viewed as an integral part of library collections. Recent studies have shown that not only are libraries acquiring significant amounts of digital content, but also that this content is both replacing and eclipsing traditional media.

Scholarly communication, particularly how libraries deliver and consume information, has changed as a result of the Web. With the majority of library catalogs and electronic collections now accessible online, either remotely or via public terminals in libraries, patron preference also tends toward electronic journal usage. The most-cited reasons for preferring electronic journals include ease of access, ease of printing, and ease of searching.

It is common for libraries to seek solutions to address new issues broached by electronic resources and electronic access to the library. These solutions are typically software (and hardware) to help librarians track and serve information digitally, thereby maintaining the library’s relevance as a research partner when competing with freely available information on the Web. E-resource access and management services (ERAMS) are one such category of solution.

== Overview ==
E-resource access and management services (ERAMS) are a new business category of library services designed specifically to make electronic collections accessible for patrons and manageable for librarians so that libraries can realize the full use and value of their e-resource purchases.

ERAMS is designed to be used in library planning and budgeting to help libraries continue to provide electronic resources effectively to aid patron research.

Many products and services fall into the broad category of ERAMS: A-to-Z title lists, OpenURL link resolvers, federated search services, MARC records services, electronic resource management (ERM) applications, and more.

== Key principles ==
The foundations of ERAMS are a clear focus on electronic resources and an accurate and comprehensive knowledge base of local library holdings. Companies that provide ERAMS often focus on web-native and Web 2.0 technology to provide fully integrated and interoperable products. There are four essential processes for delivering effective ERAMS:

- Collect an e-resource knowledge base
- Correct the knowledge base to maintain accuracy
- Connect people with answers using the best method
- Control budgets, collections, and workflows to optimize value

== See also ==
- Integrated library system
- Library 2.0
- Library collection development
- Online public access catalog (OPAC)
