= VTLS =

Software developer

VTLS Inc.
- Type: Private
- Industry: Software
- Founded: 1985
- Fate: Acquired in 2014
- Successor: Innovative Interfaces
- Headquarters: Blacksburg, Virginia, United States
- Area served: Worldwide
- Products: Library & Archive Management, Digital Asset Management, Tracking & Security (RFID), Discovery

VTLS Inc. was a global company that provided library automation software and services to a diverse customer base of more than 1900 libraries in 44 countries. The for-profit company was founded in 1985 by Dr. Vinod Chachra, who became the president and CEO of the company. VTLS originated as "Virginia Tech Library Systems", an automated circulation and cataloging system created for Virginia Tech’s Newman Library in 1975. In addition to its headquarters in Blacksburg, Virginia, United States, VTLS had five international offices in Australia, Brazil, India, Malaysia and Spain. VTLS was one of the few ISO 9001:2008 quality-certified companies within the library industry for many years. The company was acquired by Innovative Interfaces in 2014.

== History ==
VTLS Inc. was the offspring of a project launched in 1974 at Virginia Polytechnic Institute and State University's (Virginia Tech’s) Newman Library, a member of the Association of Research Libraries with more than 2 million cataloged volumes. Having explored available library automation alternatives and having found no system suitable for the needs of its libraries, Virginia Tech initiated a development project to create an automated library system, spearheaded by Dr. Vinod Chachra, head of Systems Development (SD). This forerunner of VTLS Classic and Virtua, consisting of an Online Public Access Catalog (OPAC) and an automated circulation system, was installed at Virginia Tech's Newman Library in September 1975.

By 1980, the software had evolved into the integrated library system (ILS) known as "VTLS Classic", a MARC based ILS including library automation. In 1983, VTLS became the first integrated library system to implement linked Authority Control and to feature full integration and support of the MARC Format for bibliographic records. On July 1, 1985, VTLS Inc. was formed by Dr. Vinod Chachra as a subsidiary corporation of Virginia Tech Intellectual Properties (VTIP), which granted VTLS Inc. exclusive, worldwide rights to enhance and market VTLS software. The ensuing years witnessed dramatic growth for VTLS and development of the VTLS system. By 1987, VTLS became the first ILS to fully support the US MARC Format for Holdings and Locations in a fully integrated Serials Control Subsystem. In 1989, VTLS introduced a multilingual user interface design that allowed users to change language dynamically within their user session. VTLS also began offering imaging services and digital library solutions in 1993.

In 1998, VTLS launched their next-generation library automation suite with the first release of the "Virtua Integrated Library System" (ILS). Virtua incorporated all of the functionality of VTLS Classic but utilized an entirely new software architecture that included full Unicode support throughout the system as well as full native Z39.50 support. Since the introduction of Virtua, VTLS continued to develop support for new standards and emerging technologies. In 2000, VTLS introduced support for radio-frequency identification (RFID) technology for circulation and security, later expanding it into the "Fastrac" product division. In 2002, VTLS introduced full support for Functional Requirements for Bibliographic Records (FRBR), a key bibliographic standard enabling full Resource Description and Access (RDA) Level 1 implementation. In 2004, VTLS introduced the "VITAL Digital Asset Management System". Later developments focused on discovery software for patrons with the introduction of "Visualizer Discovery" in 2008, the "Chamo Social OPAC" in 2009, and a hybrid of the two products called "Chamo Discovery" in 2012. VTLS later introduced a service called "Vorpal Solutions", which offered custom Drupal modules that allowed deployment of a complete custom Drupal-based front-end for VTLS solutions. This was followed in 2013 by the introduction of the "Open Skies" unified software platform initiative, planning for the future interconnectivity of various VTLS-based software components as well as more open connectivity with external library services.

Throughout its history, VTLS was a member of many industry organizations, including: American Library Association (ALA), Book Industry Study Group (BISG), Coalition for Networked Information (CNI), EDUCAUSE, International Federation of Library Associations and Institutions (IFLA), MARBI, National Information Standards Organization (NISO) for Z39.50, Online Computer Library Center (OCLC), the Unicode Consortium, and the Virginia Business Pipeline (VBP). VTLS was also a founding member of the Coalition for Networked Information (CNI).

In June 2014, VTLS was purchased by Innovative Interfaces Inc., who continues to actively develop and support most of the VTLS-based software suites.
