= Blacklight (software) =

Open source software used by libraries

- Release: October 30, 2009; 16 years ago
- Stable release: 9.0.0 / 25 November 2025; 8 months ago
- Written in: Ruby
- Type: Library and information science software
- License: Apache License
- Website: projectblacklight.org
- Repository: github.com/projectblacklight/blacklight

Blacklight is an open-source Ruby on Rails engine for creating search interfaces on top of Apache Solr indices. The software is used by libraries to create discovery layers or institutional repositories; by museums and archives to highlight digital collections; and by other information retrieval projects.

== History ==
The University of Virginia began developing Blacklight based on its Collex scholarly publishing software, which also used Ruby and Rails and Solr. The goals of the project included improving the user experience over contemporary OPAC systems, particularly with regard to relevance ranking, and showcasing historically underutilized library collections.

== Features ==
Blacklight includes support faceted browsing, relevance-based searching, bookmarking documents, permanent URLs for documents. It is relatively simple to customize Blacklight, typically by writing Ruby code that overrides default Blacklight code. There are several plugins available for Blacklight as well, including an extension for geospatial data, a digital exhibit creation tool, and various search and user interface features.

== Implementations ==
- Early adopters of Blacklight include libraries at University of Virginia, Stanford University, North Carolina State University, WGBH Open Vault, and University of Wisconsin–Madison.
- The National Radio Astronomy Observatory uses Blacklight to provide access to data about telescopes, papers, conference proceedings, and theses.
- The International Consortium of Investigative Journalists used Blacklight with Apache Tika to comb through the 11.5 million documents from Mossack Fonseca popularly known as the Panama Papers.

== See also ==
- VuFind
