= Citavi =

Software for reference management and knowledge organization

- Citavi 6 - References, Quotations, Preview
- Developer: Swiss Academic Software GmbH
- Stable release: 7.3.1.30 / June 3, 2026
- Operating system: Windows 11, Windows 10, Windows Server 2019, Windows Server 2016, Windows Server 2012
- Available in: English, French, German, Italian, Polish, Portuguese, Spanish
- Type: Reference management
- License: Proprietary
- Website: Citavi website

Citavi is a reference management and knowledge organization program for Microsoft Windows published by Swiss Academic Software in Wädenswil, Switzerland. There is also an interface called Citavi Web which can be used on a Mac. Citavi is widely used in Germany, Austria, and Switzerland, with site licenses at most universities, many of which offer training sessions and settings files for Citavi.

In February of 2021, Swiss Academic Software was bought by QSR International.

In 2022, with the financial backing of TA Associates (a private equity firm), QSR International joined forces with two partners, Palisade and Addinsoft, to found Lumivero, a new data analytics software platform.

== Versions ==
Citavi began as a reference management program called LiteRat, developed at the Heinrich Heine University in 1995, and considered version 1.0. The first version to bear the Citavi name was released as Citavi 2. Version 3 was released in November 2010 and was the first version with a user interface in English. Since version 4, released in April 2013, it is possible to switch between English, French, German, Italian, Polish, Portuguese, and Spanish. Citavi 5 was released in April 2015, with editions for single users and teams. In February 2018, Citavi 6 added the ability to save projects in the Citavi Cloud and to share them with other users with differentiated access rights.

Citavi can be used in a virtual machine on Linux or Mac OS. Swiss Academic Software discontinued development for an OS X native application in 2011.

Since 2022, a new version for the web (Citavi Web) is available and makes it possible to be completely free of the operating system: only a web browser is needed to access the trial version (30-day trial with 1 GB of storage in the Citavi Cloud).

== Products ==
- Citavi for Windows can be downloaded at no cost from the website. It can be fully tested with a 30-day trial license that expires automatically.
- A Citavi for Windows license comes with 5 GB of space used for PDF attachments. Can be used with both local and cloud projects.
- Citavi for DBServer licenses enable institutions and companies to save project data in a MS SQL Server in their Intranet. User access is managed via Active Directory, concurrent access for unlimited users with individual access rights to database is possible.
- Citavi Web, an operating system-independent version, is directly accessible with a web browser on the internet in a trial version (30-day trial with 1 GB of available data space in the Citavi Cloud).

Cloud projects are saved in the Citavi Cloud, and local projects are saved on the hard drive of the computer. Cloud projects can be shared with others, the roles that can be assigned are Reader, Author and Project leader.

== Features ==
Citavi's core features are reference management, knowledge organization, and task planning. Citavi's integrated quick help in context is backed up by online help tools including an online manual, an email tutorial, videos, an actively managed user forum and, for users with a license, personal support.

=== Reference management ===
- Management of 35 reference types for common sources like books, articles, lectures, audio or video documents, etc.
- Online search in thousands of databases (among others, in PubMed, Web of Science, etc.) and library catalogs, support of the COinS method to grab bibliographic information from publisher websites and subscription to RSS feeds from within Citavi.
- The Citavi Picker add ons for Mozilla Firefox, Internet Explorer, and Google Chrome recognize ISBN numbers, DOI names, PubMed identifier, PubMed Central ID and arXiv id on web pages, the corresponding titles can be imported into Citavi with a click. Web pages can be imported as a reference and transformed into a PDF document to save the content of the page. The Citavi Picker for Adobe Acrobat and Acrobat Reader can import PDF documents, bibliographical information is automatically added if available.
- PDF documents can be annotated directly in Citavi., Their full text is included in the Citavi search if extractable.
- Citavi integrates with various word processors.
  - Citavi's add-in for Microsoft Word lets the user insert citations and quotations from Citavi into Word without leaving the word processor. The bibliography is created automatically.
  - Several LaTeX editors can be used to directly insert quotations and configurable cite commands (i.e. \cite{Smith2013}) per keyboard shortcut. Citavi connects with LyX via a named pipe (Configuration guide; PDF; 1.2 MB).
  - In OpenOffice and LibreOffice Writer, and any other program that can process files in RTF (i.e. Scrivener) placeholders are inserted into the text, with subsequent formatting in one of the included citation styles. [only up to version Citavi 5]
- Publishing in all common citation styles. 11,512 citation styles are available (24 April 2021). Registered users can request styles for scientific journals. Citavi's citation style editor supports programmable components and templates, an advanced style finder is available to search with style features to find a fitting style.

=== Knowledge organization ===
- Citavi can extract text excerpts and images from documents as quotations, and organize them together with own ideas imported as "thoughts". Quotations and thoughts can be copied into the word processor, citations are added automatically. There are five types of quotations and two further types of ideas for text and images.
- When annotated in Citavi, quotations and comments in PDF documents are linked to the exact position in the PDF document.
- Citations, quotations and ideas can be categorized in Citavi to reflect the structure in chapters of the final publication, making it possible to outline the paper before beginning the actual writing process.

=== Task planner ===
- Citavi includes a task planner for scheduling tasks and project milestones to organize deadlines like lending periods for books. Tasks like "Discuss" or "Examine" can be linked to specific parts in PDF documents.
- In Cloud and DBServer projects it is possible to assign tasks to other team members.

== Compatibility ==
Citavi can export data in different formats to other reference management programs, and Citavi can import references from other reference management programs, either directly, as from EndNote or BibTeX, or with an import filter or via a RIS export file, as from Mendeley, ProCite, Reference Manager, RefMe, RefWorks, Zotero, and others.
