= Janine Deakin =

Australian geneticist

- Born: 1971 (age 54–55); Sydney, New South Wales, Australia
- Education: Macquarie University (BSc, PhD)
- Known for: Marsupial and monotreme genomics, devil facial tumour disease research
- Scientific career
- Fields: Genetics, comparative genomics, epigenetics
- Institutions: UT Health San Antonio, Australian National University, University of Canberra

Janine Deakin is an Australian geneticist, academic leader, and consultant. She is the founder and principal consultant of Janine Deakin Consulting, a consultancy focused on supporting academics and universities in building sustainable academic careers. Previously, she was a professor at the University of Canberra and served as Executive Dean of the Faculty of Science and Technology as well as interim Deputy Vice Chancellor Research and Enterprise in 2024. She is a geneticist with expertise in the areas of comparative genomics, epigenetics, genetic immunology, and genome structure and regulation. A majority of her work has focused on Australian marsupials and monotremes, where her cytogenetic and molecular research on marsupial chromosomes and development of strategies to map genomes has provided insight into the evolution of mammalian genomes.

== Early life and education ==
Deakin was born in Sydney, New South Wales in 1971. She attended Our Lady of the Rosary Primary School, Waitara and Mt St Benedict Girls’ High School, Pennant Hills.

She received her BSc(Honours) in 1994 at Macquarie University in Sydney. She then completed her PhD in Biology at Macquarie University in 1998 entitled “Immunology of mother-pouch young relationships in the brushtail possum, (Trichosurus vulpecula). Her thesis investigated the possibility of controlling possums in New Zealand by sterilizing the pouch young via the mother's immune response to a molecule important to sexual differentiation. She found, however, that this approach to possum control was unlikely to be effective due to the high level of non-responders to any antigen among possums.

== Career ==
In 1998 Deakin moved to San Antonio, Texas to conduct postdoctoral research at the University of Texas Health Science Center at San Antonio. She studied the effects of glucocorticoids on aging using knock-in mice (1998–2000).

She returned to Australia in 2001 as a postdoctoral fellow in the Evolution, Ecology and Genetics Division at the Australian National University, Canberra, which developed into a research fellow position with Prof Jenny Graves. Her research from 2001 to 2011 focused on marsupial and monotreme genomics, including cytogenetics, immunogenetics, epigenetics, and genome evolution.

Deakin was involved in the ARC Centre of Excellence for Kangaroo Genomics (2004–2010) and led the ANU team responsible for constructing the physical map of the tammar wallaby (Notamacropus eugenii) genome.

In 2011, she was awarded an ARC Future Fellowship to study the evolution of devil facial tumour disease. She transferred this fellowship from the Australian National University to the University of Canberra, where she was appointed as an associate professor in 2013 and later progressed to Professor.

During her time at the University of Canberra, Deakin held multiple leadership roles, including Deputy Director and Director of the Institute for Applied Ecology, as well as Deputy Dean, before being appointed Executive Dean of the Faculty of Science and Technology in January 2021. While serving as Executive Dean, she maintained her role as a genomics professor, concentrating her research on native Australian species, specifically studying Tasmanian devil facial tumour disease, speciation in rock-wallabies, and sex determination in the central bearded dragon.

Deakin later founded Janine Deakin Consulting to assist higher education institutions and individual researchers. Her firm offers personalized career guidance alongside institutional workshops aimed at strengthening leadership abilities, building sustainable academic workforces, and supporting career advancement, with specialized offerings tailored for early- and mid-career academics, emerging leaders, and women in STEM disciplines.

== Research and outreach ==
Deakin's research focuses on comparative genomics, cytogenetics, and epigenetics in non-model organisms, particularly native Australian mammals. Alongside her scientific research, she has participated in media coverage and public outreach activities focused on wildlife conservation.
