= Jenny Graves =

Australian geneticist (born 1941)

Jenny Graves AC FAA
- Born: 24 November 1941 (age 84); Adelaide, South Australia
- Education: University of Adelaide; University of California, Berkeley
- Occupation: Geneticist
- Employer: La Trobe University
- Awards: Prime Minister's Prize for Science; Macfarlane Burnet Medal and Lecture; Centenary Medal
- Website: biology.anu.edu.au/people/jennifer-graves

Jennifer Ann Marshall Graves AC FAA (born 24 November 1941) is an Australian geneticist. She is Distinguished Professor at La Trobe University, Australia and Professor Emeritus of the Australian National University.

== Early life and education ==
Graves was born in Adelaide, South Australia in 1941. She was born as the first daughter to Tim Marshall – head of the Division of Soils at Commonwealth Scientific and Industrial Research Organisation (CSIRO) – and Ann Nicholls, who lectured at the Geography Department at the University of Adelaide. Her younger sister is Lyn Richards.

Graves attended Highgate Primary School, then Presbyterian Girls' College (now Seymour College), both in Adelaide.

She received her BSc from the University of Adelaide in 1964, and an MSc in 1967 for work on the epigenetic silencing of one X chromosome in female marsupials. She then received a PhD in 1971 for her work on the control of DNA synthesis from the University of California, Berkeley.

== Career ==
In 1971, Graves returned to Australia to lecture in genetics at La Trobe University, where she then became Professor in 1991. As a teacher, she champions the idea that every biology topic is united by evolution and endorses the maxim that "Nothing in Biology Makes Sense Except in the Light of Evolution".

Graves has published numerous high-profile papers in her career and has made a seminal contribution to understanding the organization, evolution, function and conservation of the mammalian genome. To do this, she has utilised the genetic diversity of Australian animals (specifically the kangaroo, platypus, Tasmanian devils and dragons (lizards)). Her work had led to significant and influential new theories on the origin and evolution of the human sex chromosomes and sex determination, including the controversial prediction that the human Y chromosome is disappearing. She also made the critical discovery that the epigenetic silencing of mammalian X chromosomes occurs by transcriptional inhibition, and that this is mediated by DNA methylation. In the mid-1980s, Graves became involved in international comparative gene mapping and sequencing projects, where she promoted the value of including distantly related species in comparative genomics analyses and initiated projects to sequence the genomes of Australian marsupials and the platypus. In 2001 she became head of the Comparative Genomics Research Unit and Director of the ARC Centre for Excellence in Kangaroo Genomics, based at the Research School of Biological Sciences at the Australian National University. During this time she worked extensively with Associate Professor Janine Deakin.

In 1999, Graves was elected as Fellow of the Australian Academy of Science. Since this time she has served first as Foreign Secretary, then as Education Secretary where she was responsible for the Academy's science education projects. She is a 2006 L'Oreal-UNESCO Laureate, and has received many awards for her work, including the MacFarlane Burnet Medal for research in biology, and an Order of Australia.

In 2011, Graves returned to Melbourne as Distinguished Professor at La Trobe University, but retains honorary positions at the Australian National University (Professor Emeritus), the University of Canberra (Thinker-in-Residence) and the University of Melbourne (Professorial Fellow).

In 2017, she was awarded the Prime Minister's Prize for Science (Australia) for "her pioneering investigations of the genetics of sex".

=== Sex determination ===
Graves, in conjunction with her then PhD student Andrew Sinclair, was instrumental in providing evidence that the ZFY gene, at the time proposed to be the testis-determining factor, was not required for sex determination in mammals. Sex determination in placental mammals (including marsupials) results from a testis-determining gene on the Y chromosome. Via comparative genomics, Graves and Sinclair showed that ZFY is found on chromosome 5 in kangaroos and chromosome 3 in the fat-tailed dunnart rather than the Y chromosome, and therefore could not be involved in determining sex. Sinclair later showed that SRY was in fact the gene responsible for sex determination in mammals.

Following this, Graves discovered that the platypus sex chromosomes are not homologous to the therian XY sex chromosomes. Owing to this work, the emergence of mammalian sex chromosomes could be dated back to between 160–190 million years ago, between the divergence of therian mammals from monotremes and the divergence of the marsupial-eutherian species.

Graves' work with colleagues led to the discovery that the Australian reptile the dragon lizard exhibits both genetic and temperature dependent sex determination. At normal temperatures, the sex of offspring is determined via genetic factors (ZZ male, ZY female) as two copies of this Z-borne gene (ZZ) are required to induce testis formation. At higher temperatures, however, all hatchlings are female. It is proposed that this occurs due to heat inactivation of a dose sensitive Z-borne gene, resulting in ZZ hatchlings with insufficient sex determination product. Due to this reduced dose, ZZ hatchlings develop into sex-reversed females. This work condradicted the prevailing hypothesis at the time that genetic and temperature dependent sex determining systems were fundamentally different.

=== Origins (oratorio) ===
Graves teamed up with poet Leigh Hay, both choristers of Melbourne's Heidelberg Choral Society, to write a libretto elucidating the state-of-the-art science of our origins for a new oratorio Origins of the Universe, of Life, of Species, of Humanity. The Heidelberg Choral Society commissioned Melbourne-born composer Nicholas Buc to compose the music. The world premiere of the almost 2-hour-long oratorio took place on 18 July 2023 at the Melbourne Recital Centre during the XXIII International Congress of Genetics held in Melbourne. The performance featured the 100 voices of the Heidelberg Choral Society, a 60-piece orchestra and four soloists, directed by Peter Bandy, and was accompanied by a video backdrop by Drew Berry, a biomedical animator at the Walter and Eliza Hall Institute.

== Honours ==
- 1999 – Elected a Fellow of the Australian Academy of Science.
- 2001 – Awarded Centenary Medal "For service to Australian society and science in mammalian genetics and genomics".
- 2006 – Awarded Macfarlane Burnet Medal and Lecture by the Australian Academy of Science.
- 2010 – Appointed Officer of the Order of Australia (AO) in the 2010 Australia Day Honours "For service to scientific research in the field of genetics, particularly of Australian marsupials and monotremes and their relevance to international understanding of human evolution".
- 2017 – Awarded the Prime Minister's Prize for Science, for her pioneering investigations of the genetics of sex.
- 2019 – Elected a foreign associate of the US National Academy of Sciences.
- 2020 – Elected a Fellow of the Royal Society of Victoria.
- 2022 – Promoted to Companion of the Order of Australia (AC) in the 2022 Australia Day Honours for "eminent service to science, particularly through leadership and research in evolutionary genetics, to international and national professional societies, for science education in schools, and as a mentor and role model for women".
- 2023 – Awarded the Ruby Payne-Scott Medal and Lecture by the Australian Academy of Science.
