= Electronic resource management =

Information management techniques

Electronic resource management (ERM) encompasses the practices, techniques, and software used by librarians and other information professionals to manage the electronic resources within their collections. Electronic resource management may include selecting, licensing, maintaining, evaluating, or removing electronic resources. Electronic resources include, but are not limited to, electronic journals, electronic books, streaming media, databases, datasets, CD-ROMs, and computer software. Libraries can purchase ERM software through commercial, third-party vendors, use online open-source software options, or create their own in-house ERM workflows.

== History ==
During the Information Age, libraries and other cultural heritage institutions began to manage some print resources electronically, such as through the use of CD-ROM databases. Libraries also began to include more electronic resources in their collections, such as online journals, over the course of the 1980s and 1990s. Given the increasing prevalence of electronic resources, the Digital Library Federation (DLF) conducted an informal survey in 2000 to identify the challenges facing research libraries regarding their use of digital technologies. The resulting report revealed that managing digital information was seen as the greatest source of anxiety and uncertainty among librarians at the turn of the century. In response, the DLF created the Electronic Resources Management Initiative (ERMI) in 2002 and commissioned several reports with the goal of documenting effective practices in electronic resource management throughout the early 2000s.

One successor to ERMI was the National Information Standards Organization (NISO)'s ERM Data Standards and Best Practices Project, which began in 2009. This initiative explored the potential of establishing formal ERM data standards and best practices. The authors ultimately recommended that NISO not take responsibility for maintaining ERM data standards but rather provide ERM workflow support through a series of webinars and presentations. Despite these strides in assessing ERM and making suggestions for improving existing practices, many librarians still expressed frustration with the "nonlinear and non-standardized" nature of managing electronic resources in the 2010s.

== ERM Options ==
Several companies offer ERM services and software to public libraries, academic libraries, and other cultural heritage institutions. Major commercial vendors include EBSCO, Ex Libris, and ProQuest. Major open-source options, which are freely available to download, include CORAL and FOLIO. Other institutions have developed their own in-house ERM workflows, such as the Smithsonian Institution Libraries.

== See also ==
- ERAMS (e-resource access and management services)
- OpenURL knowledge base
- UKSG E-Resources Management Handbook
