= NVivo =

Qualitative data analysis computer software package

NVivo 14
- Developer: Lumivero
- Stable release: NVivo 15 / August 27, 2024
- Operating system: Microsoft Windows, macOS
- Type: Qualitative data analysis (QDA), Qualitative research
- License: Proprietary software
- Website: lumivero.com/products/nvivo/

NVivo is a qualitative data analysis (QDA) computer software package, formerly developed and marketed by QSR International, which is now part of Lumivero. NVivo is used in the social sciences, such as anthropology, psychology, communication, sociology and human geography, as well as fields such as forensics, tourism, criminology and marketing.

== Features ==
NVivo is intended to help users organize and analyze non-numerical or unstructured data. Its developers state that it helps qualitative researchers to organize, analyze and find insights in unstructured or qualitative data like interviews, open-ended survey responses, journal articles, social media and web content, where deep levels of analysis on small or large volumes of data are required.

The software allows users to classify, sort and arrange information; examine relationships in the data; and combine analysis with linking, shaping, searching and modeling. The software can identify trends and cross-examine information in various ways using its search engine and query functions. NVivo accommodates a wide range of research methods, including network and organizational analysis, action or evidence-based research, discourse analysis, grounded theory, conversation analysis, ethnography, literature reviews, phenomenology, mixed methods research and the Framework methodology.

== History ==
The antecedent of NVivo was NUD*IST (Non-numerical Unstructured Data Indexing, Searching and Theorizing), a software program designed for detailed analysis of unstructured textual data. It was developed by Tom Richards and Lyn Richards, with the initial version for DEC-10 released in 1981. In 1997, an updated version of NUD*IST was named N4.

In 1994, Qualitative Solutions and Research Pty Ltd was set up at and then spun out of La Trobe University to support the development and marketing of NUD*IST, and shortly after the release of N4 (NUD*IST Rev 4) it began working on a ground-up redesigned sibling product, with many more features, initially named NUD*IST Alive then branded as NVivo.

Development of the original product continued alongside the new one, with the final version, N6, being consolidated into NVivo 7 in 2006. NVivo for Teams, which allows multiple users on a server to work on a project at the same time, was first released in 2010. NVivo was released for Mac in 2014. Mac versions of the software tend to have fewer features.

NVivo 15 for Windows and Mac was released on August 27, 2024.

=== Version History ===
Year	Name/version number
1981	NUD*IST 1 (DEC10)
1987	NUD*IST 2 (Vax/VMS and Unix)
1990	NUD*IST 2.3 (Mac and PC)
1993	NUD*IST 3 (Mac, later Windows 3.0)
1997	N4
1999	NVivo
2000	N5
2002	N6
2002	NVivo 2
2006	NVivo 7
2008	NVivo 8
2010	NVivo 9 and NVivo for Teams
2012	NVivo 10
2014	NVivo for Mac
2015	NVivo 11 (Windows only)
2018	NVivo 12 (Windows, Mac, and Teams)
2020	NVivo Release 1.0, also called NVivo R1 and NVivo 20, retroactively labeled as NVivo 13 (Windows, Mac)
2023	NVivo 14, also called NVivo Release 2.0, NVivo R2 and NVivo 23 (Windows, Mac)
2024	NVivo 15, also called NVivo Release 3.0, NVivo R3 and NVivo 24 (Windows, Mac)

== See also ==
- Computer-assisted qualitative data analysis software
