= Nick Santino (actor) =

American actor (1965–2012)

Nick Santino (January 24, 1965 – January 25, 2012) was an American actor known primarily for his roles on soap operas, including six episodes of Guiding Light and seven episodes of All My Children, and also appeared on Gossip Girl.

In 2010, Santino became embroiled in a dispute with the condominium board of 1 Lincoln Plaza, where he lived: a new policy forbade tenants from owning pit bull terriers. Although Santino's pit bull Rocco was grandfathered in, several restrictions were imposed on Rocco's behavior, and Santino complained about dog-related harassment from other tenants and from building staff. On January 24, 2012, Santino had Rocco euthanized, citing changes in Rocco's behavior which he attributed to the harassment and restrictions. Several hours later, Santino committed suicide; his suicide note explained that he felt he had betrayed Rocco (whom he had originally rescued from an animal shelter). The condominium board subsequently denied any responsibility for Santino's death.
