= Discovery system (bibliographic search) =

A discovery system is a bibliographic search system based on search engine technology. It is part of the concept of Library 2.0 and is intended to supplement or even replace the existing OPAC catalogs. These systems emerged in the late 2000s in response to user desire for a more convenient search option similar to that of internet search engines. The results from searching a discovery system may include books and other print materials from the library's catalog, as well as electronic resources such as e-journals or videos, and items stored in other libraries.

== Terminology ==
The term discovery layer has been described as an overarching term that can include:

- Discovery interface, a graphical user interface that library users search or browse with. It includes search-engine like amenities such as spelling correction, tolerance for punctuation differences, and typeahead search. This idea is also called a next-generation catalog.
- Discovery system, an interconnected search system, allowing library users to search not only the catalog of library print materials, but various digital resources and perhaps resources located in other libraries. The discovery system queries more than one data source upon a single user request; this is sometimes called federated search.

The term layer indicates that the software is modular and can be used to emphasize the separability of catalog search and browse functionality from an integrated library system (ILS). The distinction between discovery layer, interface, and system is not rigorous and the terms are sometimes used as synonyms. These "inconsistencies were in part due to the field's newness" when the terms were being created.

== History ==
=== OPACs ===
Users searching for print materials (such as books) at a library once used card catalogs, and later computerized catalogs called OPACs. Searching for resources other than material in the catalog, such as electronic resources, was (or is) done with separate tools. Using card or computerized catalogs well required skills and jargon particular to libraries.

As computerization advanced, OPACs were integrated with other library systems, like acquisition and circulation systems. The resulting monolithic software systems were named integrated library systems.

=== Changing expectations ===
As the web became more widespread, library users developed "the expectation of being able to discover the collection in a search engine style". Gradually, discovery interfaces were created to be more forgiving of misspellings and punctuation choices than historical OPACs, and to offer features like suggestion of related search terms and faceted search.

Reference librarians in the mid-2000s also spent "a lot of time talking about information silos". They were concerned that library users had to hunt for various types of resources with various tools, an obstacle to users, resulting in underused resources. Librarians sought multidatabase search products that would collapse the silos.

=== Emergence of the discovery layer ===
These two features, search-engine-like interfaces and multidatabase search, began to appear in the same software systems. One author dates the uniting of these features to 2009; this would be the invention of the discovery system. Particularly if decoupled from an ILS, this united product can also be called a discovery layer. "The discovery layer still uses the information and indexing in the integrated library system (ILS), but it also searches across proprietary databases and other electronic resources, all with the goal of revealing everything that a library owns or has licensed on a given topic be it a print monograph, an electronic journal article, streaming video, or a collection of archival documents"

The discovery layer can be looked on as the replacement for the OPAC. Some libraries maintain both a catalog interface OPAC and a discovery layer interface.

== Typical features of a discovery system ==
- Large search space: A search can search the data from different data sources (the discovery system has a comprehensive central subject index). For example, you can search a journal article or a textbook directly in the discovery system and you do not have to change from a subject database to the library catalog.
- Intuitive usability, like a search engine. The search is basically only a simple form, an advanced search function is not always provided.
- Ranking of the results according to relevance: The "best" hit is displayed first, not necessarily the newest one. A good ranking is important because many hits are often found due to the large search space.
- Search refinement with drill-down menus (facets): For example, a search can be restricted to all matches available online.
- Correction of input errors via a "Did you mean ...?" function.
- Autocomplete: After input to the search field, a drop-down list of suggestions appears.
- Exploratory search: One finds results of interest that were not specifically requested. For example, links to similar hits, entries in subject databases, or Wikipedia articles are displayed (integration of other web technologies).

== Examples of discovery system products ==
Some discovery layer or discovery service products are modules of a particular ILS or database product, and are sold by that product's vendor: an example is EBSCO Discovery Service. Other discovery tools are free-standing software products: Blacklight and VuFind are open-source examples.

Commercial products:

- Summon (Serial Solutions)
- Primo Central (ExLibris)
- EBSCO Discovery Service
- WorldCat Discovery (OCLC)

Open-source products:

- Blacklight
- VuFind (Villanova University Library)
- Lukida (GBV Common Library Network)
- Aspen Discovery (ByWater Solutions)

== Comparison ==
Software	Developer	Year of release	Year of latest stable release	Written in	Main purpose	License	Wikipedia article w/out issues
VuFind	Villanova University	2010	2021	PHP	Discovery	GPL-2.0-only	Yes
Blacklight	University of Virginia Library, Stanford University Libraries, and Project Blacklight team	2009	2021	Ruby	Discovery	Apache-2.0	Yes

== See also ==
- Karlsruher Virtueller Katalog – an example of a metasearch engine for library catalogs
- Library portal
