= Herbert Van de Sompel =

Belgian librarian and information scientist

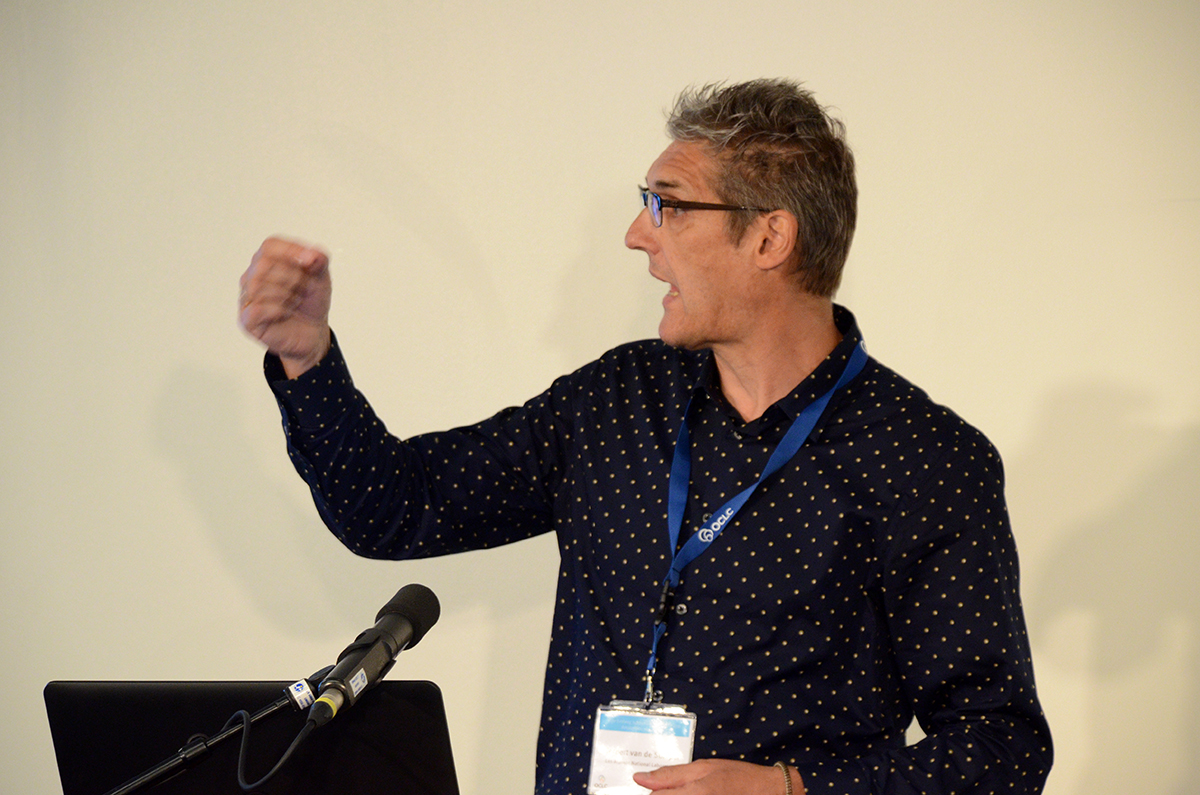
- Herbert Van de Sompel speaking at the Evolving Scholarly Record and Evolving Stewardship Ecosystem workshop in Amsterdam
- Born: March 20, 1957 (age 68); Ghent, Belgium
- Occupations: librarian, computer scientist
- Years active: 2000-present
- Website: hvdsomp.info

Herbert Van de Sompel is a Belgian librarian, computer scientist, and musician, most known for his role in the development of the Open Archives Initiative (OAI) and standards such as OpenURL, Object Reuse and Exchange, and the OAI Protocol for Metadata Harvesting.

== Career ==
Van de Sompel was born March 20, 1957, in Ghent, Belgium. His PhD dissertation in 2000 developed the idea of context-sensitive and dynamic linking of scholarly information resources. In this work, he developed the "concepts underlying the OpenURL framework for open reference linking in the web-based scholarly information environment." Van de Sompel's OpenURL framework allowed for the development of software known as link resolvers which take metadata about a source and attempt to find its full text. Link resolver web services have become widely used within academic libraries. His Ph.D. dissertation and later development of the OpenURL standard led to the development and commercialization of the SFX link resolver and a series of products for libraries using this approach pioneered by Van de Sompel.

In 2006 Van de Sompel was named the first recipient of the SPARC Innovator Award by the Scholarly Publishing and Academic Resources Coalition (SPARC) for starting the Open Archives Initiative (OAI) and the open reference linking framework (OpenURL). In 2017, Van de Sompel received the Paul Evan Peters Award from the Coalition for Networked Information (CNI).

From 2002 to the end of 2018, Van de Sompel held positions at the Los Alamos National Laboratory Research Library, including as the Lead of the Digital Library Research and Prototyping Team. Notable work includes the Memento Project, which aims to make accessing archived web content as easy as visiting current web pages. From 2019 to early 2021, he served as chief innovation officer of Data Archiving and Networked Services (DANS) in The Netherlands. Following his wife after her appointment to a position in Vienna, he resigned at DANS while keeping professional connections to both DANS and Ghent University.

Though best known for his work as a computer scientist, Van de Sompel also made music in his earlier life, including two albums, "Unploughed" and "Not a Festschrift- Geschnitzte Figuren," with his group, Young Farmers Claim Future.
