= Innovative Interfaces =

American library-software company

Innovative Interfaces, Inc

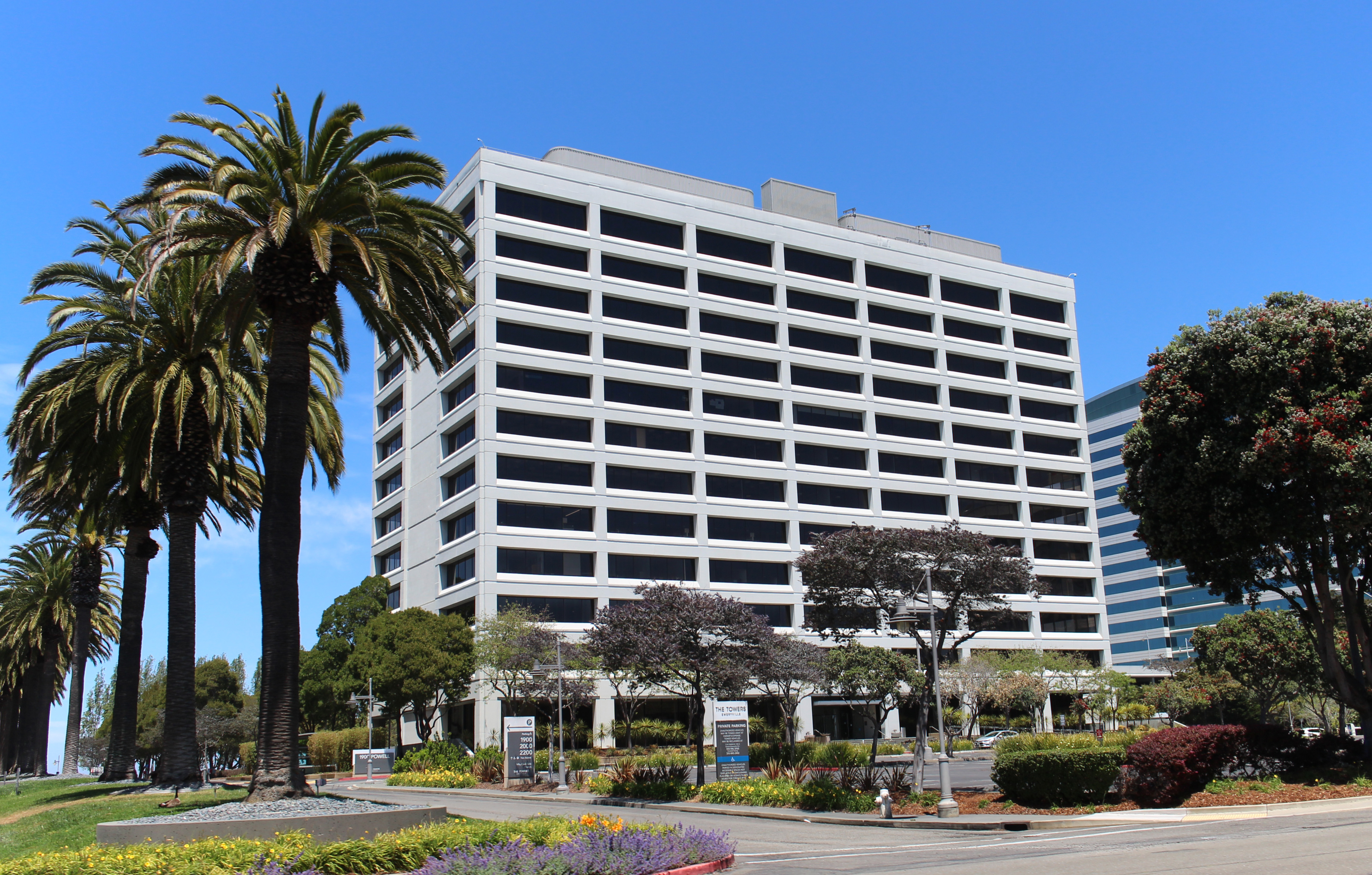
- Innovative Interfaces headquarters in Emeryville
- Type: Private; subsidiary
- Industry: Software
- Founded: 1978 (Berkeley, California)
- Founders: Jerry Kline, Steve Silberstein
- Fate: acquired by the Ex Libris Group within ProQuest (Jan. 2020), which was acquired by Clarivate in the following year (Dec. 1 2021)
- Headquarters: Emeryville, California, U.S.
- Key people: Yariv Kursh, General Manager
- Products: Library automation software
- Owner: Clarivate
- Website: www.iii.com

Innovative Interfaces, Inc. (abbreviated III and called "Innovative" or "Triple I" in the industry) is a software company specializing in integrated systems for library management. Their key products include Sierra, Polaris, Millennium, and Virtua, with customers in 66 countries. Innovative was acquired by Ex Libris (a ProQuest company) in January 2020. On December 1, 2021, Clarivate completed their acquisition of ProQuest and, by extension, Innovative.

The company's software is used by various types of libraries including academic, public, school, medical, law, and special libraries as well as consortia. In September 2014 Sierra was installed at 1494 libraries (with 3435 facilities), Polaris at 1339 (with 2808 facilities), Millennium at 1316 (with 2640 facilities), and Virtua at 224 (with 490 facilities).

Founded in 1978 by Jerry Kline and Steve Silberstein in Berkeley, California, the initial product was a system to interface OCLC data with a library's cataloging system. Huntsman Gay Global Capital and JMI Equity invested in the company in 2012, the same year Kim Massana, formerly president of Thomson Reuters Elite, was appointed CEO. The equity firms purchased the company outright the next year. The company also made several acquisitions within the next two years: SkyRiver Technology Solutions (which maintains partnerships with 3M, EBSCO Information Services, OverDrive, Inc., and Bibliotheca), Polaris Library Systems, and VTLS Inc. Bert Winemiller took over as CEO for a brief period in 2015 before the company named James Tallman as their new CEO in January 2016. During May 2019, Shaheen Javadizadeh was appointed CEO, and Jim Tallman was appointed to the role of executive chairman. In December 2019, Innovative was acquired by Ex Libris. When acquired by ProQuest/Ex Libris, Yariv Kursh was named general manager.

== Vega Platform ==
In April 2019, Innovative launched a new platform Inspire. The first product on this platform was Discovery. It was architected on a cloud-based platform. MARC records are converted to the BIBFRAME model which are made searchable in a proprietary Context Engine. Search results were then shown in a Context Wheel that represents the relationships between resources, people, and concepts. Later the platform was renamed to Vega and made publicly available in December 2020.

== Innovative Users Group ==
Formed in 1991 as an independent organization, the Innovative Users Group serves the libraries that use the company's software. The Innovative Users Group organizes an annual conference, organizes ballots for user-submitted enhancements, and maintains the IUG Clearinghouse for users to share tutorials, scripts, guides, and other resources created to better use the software.
