= UKSG =

Business association in scholarly communication

UKSG is an international association that exists to "connect the information community" and "encourage the exchange of ideas on scholarly communication". The name was originally United Kingdom Serials Group, but the association now uses only the term UKSG without definition, because it has expanded outside the UK and beyond serials, to include e-books and other electronic resources.

UKSG's 450 or so member organisations include libraries, publishers, information suppliers, intermediaries and technology vendors from around the world. Membership of UKSG and associated benefits cover all employees within an organisation. Individual membership is also available as is free membership for students over 18. UKSG is a registered charity led by a main committee of volunteers (two Honorary Officers (Chair and Vice Chair), and a further seven elected and co-opted members) who work in a variety of capacities within the scholarly communication industry.

UKSG works to facilitate discussion, stimulate research, support the professional development of its members and disseminate information about the scholarly communications sector. It runs an annual conference in the spring and a One-Day Conference and Forum in the late autumn. It also runs regular seminars, webinars and training courses. It supports an active email discussion list, lis-e-resources: a forum in which members can exchange and discuss industry news and developments.

UKSG publishes the open access peer-reviewed journal Insights: the UKSG journal, a continuation of Serials: The Journal for the Serials Community (1988-1911). It contains the latest research in the field of scholarly communications and insights into the work of all those employed in the research information chain. It provides members with a fortnightly email newsletter, UKSG eNews, which provides news of current issues and developments within the global serials industry. It also published The E-resources Management Handbook.

== Work on knowledge bases ==
In 2006 UKSG commissioned a research report that identified and described issues affecting the efficiency of OpenURL linking. One of the key issues identified was the exchange of metadata in the supply chain and the need for more common formats to aid the transfer of metadata from content providers to link resolver knowledge bases. As a result, in 2008 UKSG and NISO set up a joint initiative called Knowledge Bases And Related Tools (KBART) to make recommendations for the transfer of metadata. The first set of guidelines was published in January 2010 as a NISO Recommended Practice.

The UKSG Research and Innovation Subcommittee was at the forefront of the Transfer Code of Practice and the Journal Usage Factor (JUF) project and, with the support of Jisc, partnered with LISU to carry out the research project "Assessing the Impact of Library Discovery Technology on Content Usage", which was delivered in 2013. The UKSG Research and Innovation Subcommittee welcomes new ideas for research projects from the community.
