= Comparison of reference management software =

The following tables compare notable reference management software. The comparison includes older applications that may no longer be supported, as well as actively-maintained software.

== General ==
In the "notes" section, there is a difference between:

- web-based, referring to applications that may be installed on a web server (usually requiring MySQL or another database and PHP, Perl, Python, or some other language for web applications), and;
- a centrally hosted website.

Software	Developer	First public release	Latest stable release date	Latest stable version	Cost (USD)	Free software	License	Notes
BibBase	Christian Fritz	2005	2024-06-06	?	Free for students / Paid plan for others	No	Proprietary	Centrally hosted website, intended for publication pages
BibDesk	BibDesk developers	2002-04	2026-01-19	1.9.10	Free	Yes	BSD	BibTeX front-end + repository; Cocoa-based; integration with Spotlight
BibSonomy	University of Kassel	2006-01	2024-01-08	4.1.0	Free	Yes	AGPL, GPL, LGPL	Centrally hosted website
Bookends	Sonny Software	1988 (Mac) / 1983 (Apple II+)	2023-05-06	14.2	US$59.99 (Note: MSRP for full version, usually with physical media. Discounted downloads and academic discounts might be available. More expensive workgroup/server/librarian versions may be available.)	No	Proprietary	Desktop & iOS synced via iCloud, integrated web search, PDF download, auto-completion, Word plugin, BibTex support, PDF annotations stored as notes
Citavi	Lumivero	2006-02-13	2026-06-03	7.3.1.30	US$89-1947 (Note: Price depends on affiliation (discounted price for students and members of academic, governmental, and nonprofit organizations), edition (Citavi for Windows for single users and teams with cloud storage, Citavi for DBServer for teams with intranet storage, Citavi Web with cloud storage), and, in the case of DBServer, on the license type (per seat license vs. concurrent license): "Products". www.citavi.com. Archived from the original on 2015-04-27.)	No	Proprietary	Data can be saved locally on the computer, or, for team access, in the Citavi Cloud or an intranet Microsoft SQL Server; search databases from interface
EndNote	Clarivate	1988	2026-01-30	2026	US$275	No	Proprietary	The web version EndNote Online (formerly, EndNote Web) is free of charge
JabRef	JabRef developers	2003-11-29	2024-07-11	5.15	Free	Yes	MIT license	Java BibTeX and BibLaTeX manager
KBibTeX	KBibTeX developers	2005-08	2020-04-26	0.9.2	Free	Yes	GNU GPL	BibTeX front-end, using the KDE Software Compilation
Mendeley	Elsevier	2008-08	2025-06-05	2.135.0	Free / Online storage free up to 2 GB / Additional storage space available	No	Proprietary with public API	Account required, app versions for web, Windows, Linux, macOS. Data synced automatically between clients and server. Usable offline.
Paperpile	Stefan Washietl, Gregorgy Jordan, Andreas Gruber	2013	Continually updated online		US$2.99/month for academics, 9.99/month otherwise	No	Proprietary	Web-app, integrates with Google Docs, collaboration & sharing features, currently only on Google Chrome
Papers	ReadCube	2011-10	2023-04-04	v.4.35.2224	US$ 3/month for students, 5/month academics	No	Proprietary	Web-app, Desktop (MacOS, Windows), Mobile (iOS and Android). Microsoft Word and Google Docs add-in. Browser extension (Chrome, Firefox, Edge, Safari)
refbase	refbase developers	2003-06-03	2014-02-28	0.9.6	Free	Yes	GNU GPL	Web-based for institutional repositories/self-archiving
RefDB	refdb developers	2001-04-25	2022-02-13	1.0.3	Free	Yes	GNU GPL	Network-transparent; XML/SGML bibliographies
RefWorks	Ex Libris / ProQuest / Clarivate	2001	2024-07-09	4.6	Institutional subscription	No	Proprietary	Web-based, browser-accessed, Word & Google Docs
Zotero	Corporation for Digital Scholarship	2006	2026-07-07	9.0.6	Free / Online storage free up to 300 MB / Additional storage space available	Yes	AGPL	Native desktop and mobile applications and web browser connectors. Browser access through Zotero.org or cloud-based database folder on a user's computer (Google Drive, Dropbox, etc.).

== Operating system support ==
In the case of web applications, this describes the server OS. For centrally hosted websites that are proprietary, this is not applicable. Any client OS can connect to a web service unless stated otherwise in a footnote.

Software	Windows	macOS	Linux	ChromeOS	BSD	Unix	iOS App	Android App	Windows App
Bebop	Yes	Yes	Yes	?	Yes	Yes	No	No	No
BibBase	—N/a	—N/a	—N/a	—N/a	—N/a	—N/a	?	?	?
BibDesk	No	Yes	No	No	No	No	No	No	No
BibSonomy	—N/a	—N/a	—N/a	—N/a	—N/a	—N/a	?	?	?
Bookends	No	Yes	No	?	No	No	Yes	?	?
Citavi	Yes	No	No	No	No	No	No	No	No
EndNote	Yes	Yes	No	No	No	No	Yes	No	No
JabRef	Yes	Yes	Yes	No	No	Yes	No	No	No
KBibTeX	Experimental	Experimental	Yes	?	Yes	Yes	No	No	No
Mendeley	Yes	Yes	Yes	No	No	No	No (phased out as of March 15, 2021)	No (phased out as of March 15, 2021)	No
Paperpile	Yes	Yes	Yes	Yes	No (requires Chromium)	No (requires Chromium)	Yes	Yes	No
Papers	Yes	Yes	No	Yes	No	No	Yes	Yes	Yes
Pybliographer	Partial (Note: The GUI requires gnome-python, which isn't available for Windows or macOS.)	Partial	Yes	?	Yes	Yes	No	No	No
refbase	Yes	Yes	Yes	Yes	Yes	Yes	No	No	No
RefDB	Yes	Yes	Yes	?	Yes	Yes	No	No	No
RefWorks	Yes	Yes	No	Yes	Yes	?	No	?	No
Zotero	Yes	Yes	Yes	Intel only	No	Yes	Yes	Yes	Yes

== Export file formats ==
This table lists the machine-readable file formats that can be exported from reference managers. These are typically used to share data with other reference managers or with other people who use a reference manager. To exchange data from one program to another, the first program must be able to export to a format that the second program may import. Import file formats are in a table below this one.

Software	BibTeX	Endnote/Refer/BibIX	Medline	MODS XML	RIS	Other
Bebop	Yes	No	No	No	No	unAPI
BibBase	Yes	No	No	No	No	None
BibDesk	Yes	No	Yes	Yes	Yes	Endnote XML, user customizable
BibSonomy	Yes	Yes	No	No	Yes	Various
Bookends	Yes	Yes	Yes	No	Yes	Various user-customizable
Citavi	Yes	Yes	Yes	Yes	Yes	NVivo and various others
EndNote	Yes	Yes	Yes	No	Yes	Various
JabRef	Yes	Yes	No	Yes	Yes	BibTeXML, DocBook, HTML, OpenDocument for OO.o, RTF, SQL database, user-customizable
KBibTeX	Yes	Yes	No	Depends (Note: Supported through the bibutils plugin.)	Yes	PDF, PostScript, HTML, XML, RTF
Mendeley	Yes	Yes	No	No	Yes	Endnote XML
Paperpile	Yes	No	No	No	Yes	CSV,JSON
Papers	Yes	Yes	No	No	Yes	None
Pybliographer	Yes	Yes	Yes	No	No	Ovid
refbase	Yes	Yes	No	Yes	Yes	COinS, OpenDocument for OO.o, SRW XML via SRU, unAPI, Word XML
RefDB	Yes	Yes	No	Yes	Yes	SRW XML via SRU web service, DocBook, TEI
RefWorks	Yes	Yes	No	Yes	Yes	RIS, BibTeX, Tab delimited or XML metadata
Zotero	Yes	Yes	As of version 4.0	Yes	Yes	COinS, CSV, Several RDF format standards, TEI, Wikipedia citation templates, Endnote XML, CSL JSON, Refer/BiblX, RefWorks tagged

== Import file formats ==
This table lists the file formats which may be manually imported into the reference managers without needing to connect to one particular database. Many of these database companies use the same name for their file format as they do for their database (including Copac, CSA, ISI, Medline, Ovid, PubMed, and SciFinder). For the ability to retrieve citations from the particular databases (rather than the file format), please refer to the database connectivity table that is below this table.

As of January 2021, CSL YAML is not supported by any reference management system.

Software	BibTeX	Copac	CSA	Endnote/Refer/BibIX	ISI	Medline	MODS XML	Ovid	PubMed	RIS	SciFinder	Other
Bebop	Yes	No	No	No	No	No	No	No	No	No	No	None
BibBase	Yes	No	No	No	No	No	No	No	No	No	No	None
BibDesk	Yes	Yes	No	Yes	Yes	Yes	Yes	No	Yes	Yes	Yes	MARC, JSTOR, Reference Miner
BibSonomy	Yes	No	No	Yes	No	No	No	No	No	No	No	Firefox bookmarks
Bookends	Yes	Yes	Yes	Yes	Yes	Yes	No	Yes	Yes	Yes	Yes	Various user-customizable
Citavi	Yes	Yes	Yes	Yes	Yes	Yes	Yes	Yes	Yes	Yes	Yes	Various
EndNote	No	No	Yes	Yes	Yes	Yes	No	Yes	Yes	Yes	Yes	Various
JabRef	Yes	Yes	Yes	Yes	Yes	Yes	Yes	Yes	Yes	Yes	Yes	BibTexML, Biomail, Inspec, JSTOR, MSBib, PDF with XMP annotations, REPEC (NEP), SilverPlatter, SixPack
KBibTeX	Yes	No	No	Yes	No	No	Depends	No	Yes	Yes	No	None
Mendeley	Yes	No	No	Yes	No	No	No	No	No	Yes	No	Browser bookmarks
Paperpile	Yes	No	No	Yes	Yes	Yes	No	No	Yes	Yes	No	PDF, MARC
Papers	Yes	No	No	Yes	No	No	No	No	Yes	Yes	No	PDF
Pybliographer	Yes	No	No	Yes	Yes	Yes	No	Yes	No	No	No	None
refbase	Yes	Yes	Yes	Yes	Yes	Yes	Yes	No	Yes	Yes	Yes	RefWorks
RefDB	Yes	Yes	No	Yes	Yes	Yes	Yes	No	Yes	Yes	Yes	MARC, risx
RefWorks	Yes	Yes	Yes	Yes	Yes	Yes	Yes	Yes	Yes	Yes	Yes	Various
Zotero	Yes	No (Note: Zotero can import references directly from the database after which this format is named, although it cannot read the format itself.)	No	Yes	Yes	Yes	Yes	Yes	Yes	Yes	No	COinS, MARC, RDF, unAPI, Browser bookmarks, Endnote XML, others

== Citation styles ==
Software	APA	Chicago/Turabian	Harvard	MLA	Other	Extension method
Bebop	No	No	No	No	No	No
BibBase	Yes	No	No	No	No	No
BibDesk	Yes	Yes	Yes	Yes	Various	BibTeX style files (use Pandoc § CiteProc for CSL) or BibDesk export templates
BibSonomy	Yes	No	Yes	No	No	No
Bookends	Yes	Yes	Yes	Yes	Various	?
Citavi	Yes	Yes	Yes	Yes	Various	Citavi format (through GUI), includes conditions and programmable components; BibTeX or BibLaTeX when used with LaTeX (use Pandoc § CiteProc for CSL)
EndNote	Yes	Yes	Yes	Yes	Various	EndNote format (through GUI)
JabRef	Yes	Yes	Yes	Yes	Various	BibTeX style files or BibLaTeX (use Pandoc § CiteProc for CSL)
KBibTeX	Yes	Yes	Yes	Yes	Various	BibTeX style files (use Pandoc § CiteProc for CSL)
Mendeley	Yes	Yes	Yes	Yes	Various	CSL
Paperpile	Yes	Yes	Yes	Yes	Various	CSL
Papers	Yes	Yes	Yes	Yes	Various	CSL; BibTeX or BibLaTeX when used with LaTeX
Pybliographer	Yes	No	No	No	None	Pybliographer XML
refbase	Yes	Yes	Yes	Yes	Various polar & marine journals	PHP
RefDB	Yes	Yes	Yes	Yes	21 biomedical & law journals	XML (citestylex.dtd), interactive script
RefWorks	Yes	Yes	Yes	Yes	Various	RefWorks format (through GUI); CSL
Zotero	Yes	Yes	Yes	Yes	Various	CSL; BibTeX or BibLaTeX when used with LaTeX

== Reference list file formats ==
EndNote is incompatible with LaTeX. Among other things, it does not provide for robust citation keys.

Software	HTML	LaTeX (Note: This refers to the direct output of raw LaTeX (often in a format similar to the BibTeX-generated .bbl files). Many programs can export BibTeX (see above table), which can then be processed into LaTeX.)	RTF	Plain text	RSS	Other
Bebop	Yes	No	No	No	Yes	unAPI
BibBase	Yes	No	No	No	Yes	No
BibDesk	Yes	Yes	Yes	Yes	Yes	Atom, DOC, PDF, XML,
BibSonomy	Yes	No	Yes	Yes	Yes	OpenOffice-CSV
Bookends	Yes	No	Yes	Yes	No	Clipboard
Citavi	Yes	Yes (Note: Database can be exported as a whole in BibTeX format. Text (i.e. thoughts, comments, and quotations) can be fed into a number of TeX editors in LaTeX code or UTF-8.)	Yes	Yes	No	Clipboard, DOC, ODT, PDF, HTML
EndNote	Yes	No	Yes	Yes	No	Clipboard, XML
JabRef	Yes	Yes	Yes	Yes	No	Clipboard
KBibTeX	Yes	No	Yes	No	No	PDF, PS
Mendeley	Yes	Yes (Note: Database can be exported as a whole in BibTeX format.Insert citations via citation key generated by Mendeley.)	Yes	Yes	Yes	Clipboard, embeddable HTML widget, RSS
Paperpile	Yes	Yes	Yes	Yes	No	Clipboard
Papers	Yes	No	No	No	No	PDF
Pybliographer	Yes	?	No	Yes	No	No
refbase	Yes	Yes	Yes	Yes	Yes	Markdown, PDF, unAPI
RefDB	Yes	?	Yes	Yes	No	DocBook, TEI
RefWorks	Yes	No	Yes	Yes	No	DOC, ODT
Zotero	Yes	Possible via plugin	Yes	Possible via plugins	Yes	Clipboard

== Word processor integration ==
Some reference management software include support for automatic embedding and (re)formatting of references in Word processor programs. This table lists this type of support for Microsoft Word, Pages, Apache OpenOffice / LibreOffice Writer, the LaTeX editors Kile and LyX, and Google Docs. Other programs are able to scan RTF or other textual formats for inserted placeholders which are subsequently formatted. Most reference management programs support copy/paste or drag-and-drop of references into any editor, but this is not meant here.

Software	Word for Windows	Word for Mac	Word Online	Pages	Apache OpenOffice / LibreOffice	Kile/LyX	Google Docs	RTF scan (Note: Can reformat references in a properly saved RTF document, allowing limited use in OpenOffice.org Writer, StarOffice, FrameMaker, Microsoft Works, WordPad, WordPerfect, Google Docs and others.)	Other
Bebop	No	No	No	No	No	No	No	No	None
BibBase	No	No	No	No	No	No	No	No	None
BibDesk	No	No	No	No	No	Yes	No	Yes	User-created scripts
BibSonomy	No	No	No	No	No	No	No	No	None
Bookends	Yes	Yes	No	Yes	Yes	No	No	Yes	Mellel, Nisus
Citavi	Yes	Yes	No	No	Only versions prior to 6.0	Yes	No	Only versions prior to 6.0	LaTeX editors Texmaker, TeXnicCenter, TeXstudio, TeXworks, WinEdt, WinShell
EndNote	Yes	Yes	Yes	Yes	No	No	Yes	Yes	No
JabRef	Yes	?	?	?	Yes	Yes	No	?	Emacs, Texmaker, TeXstudio, Vim, WinEdt
KBibTeX	No	?	?	?	No	Yes	No	?	None
Mendeley	Yes	Partial (Note: Requires the Mendeley Reference Manager desktop app for Mac open to choose references.)	Yes	No	Yes	No	No	?	NeoOffice
Paperpile	Yes	Yes	No	No	No	No	Yes	No	No
Papers	Yes	Yes	Yes	Yes	Yes	No	Yes	No	Manuscripts app, Scrivener, Ulysses
Pybliographer	No	?	?	?	Yes	Yes	No	?	None
refbase	No	?	?	?	Yes	No	No	Yes	PIRA, MediaWiki, SPIP
RefDB	No	?	?	?	No	No	No	No	None
RefWorks	Yes	Yes	No	No	No	No	Yes	Yes	None
Zotero	Yes	Yes	No	No	Yes	(with LyZ)	Yes	Yes	Various

== Database connectivity ==
This table lists the academic databases and search engines which reference managers can import from. In some cases, a search and retrieval can be conducted directly in the reference manager. In others, a bookmarklet or Firefox extension will allow a site to be scraped.

Software	ArXiv	CiteSeer	IEEE Xplore	PubMed	Unpaywall (Note: Includes all the other databases and open access repositories.)	Other
Bebop	No	No	No	No	No	No
BibBase	No	No	No	No	No	DBLP, Zotero, BibSonomy, Mendeley
BibDesk	Yes	Yes	No	Yes	No	ACM portal, Jstor, DBLP, Google Scholar, Web of Science, any Z39.50 or Entrez, and others
BibSonomy	Yes	Yes	Yes	Yes	No	Various
Bookends	Yes	No	No	Yes	No	Web of Science, Amazon, Google Scholar, Z39.50
Citavi	Yes	Yes	Yes	Yes	No	WorldCat/OCLC, Ovid, EBSCO, ProQuest, Web of Science, Z39.50 (4500+ online resources), SRU. Further catalogs are added upon request. Browser plugins (Firefox, Chrome, Internet Explorer) support DOI lookup, ISBN lookup, PubMed ID lookup, PMCID lookup, arXiv ID lookup, COinS and import from Wikipedia.
EndNote	Yes	No	Yes	Yes	No	Various, any Z39.50
JabRef	Yes	Yes	Yes	Yes	Yes	ACM Portal, CrossRef, DBLP, DOAJ, DOI, GVK, Google Scholar, INSPIRE-HEP, Medline, MathSciNet, SAO/NASA Astrophysics Data System, Springer, and zbMATH
KBibTeX	Yes	Yes	Yes	Yes	No	BibSonomy, CiteBase, CSB, DBLP, Google Scholar, ScienceDirect, INSPIRE-HEP, Z MATH, Z39.50
Mendeley	Yes	Yes	Yes	Yes	No	Various
Paperpile	Yes	No	Yes	Yes	Yes	Google Scholar, INSPIRE-HEP, ACM portal, Jstor, Web of Science
Papers	Yes	No	Yes	Yes	No	Microsoft Academic, Google Scholar
Pybliographer	No	No	No	Yes	No	None
refbase	Yes	No	No	Yes	No	DOI lookup
RefDB	Yes	No	No	Yes	No	Any Z39.50
RefWorks	No	No	No	Yes	No	Various
Zotero	Yes	Yes	Yes	Yes	Yes	Various

== Password "protection" and network versions ==
Some reference managers provide network functionality (N/A, not available, means the product has no networking, while "No" indicates it does but lacks an implemented feature). The Lightweight Directory Access Protocol (LDAP) is an open, vendor-neutral, industry standard application protocol for accessing and maintaining distributed directory services over an Internet Protocol (IP) network.

Software	Passworded	LDAP	Networking	
Software	Passworded	LDAP	User-specific permissions (Note: Most databases allow one to create different user accounts to store records. Some further allow you to specify permissions (granting and denying some users the rights to edit or read some or all of your records). This column describes the latter.)	Simultaneous write access
Bebop	No	?	—N/a	—N/a
BibBase	—N/a	?	—N/a	—N/a
BibDesk	Yes	?	No	No
BibSonomy	Yes	?	Yes	Yes
Bookends	?	?	?	?
Citavi	Yes (Note: Storage in Citavi cloud or, with special license, in Microsoft SQL Server in intranet.)	?	Yes	Yes
EndNote	Yes	?	No (Note: via EndNote basic (cloud based))	No
JabRef	No	?	No	Partial
KBibTeX	No	?	—N/a	—N/a
Mendeley	Yes (Note: via Mendeley Web.)	?	Yes	Yes
Paperpile	Yes (Note: Uses Google Account.)	?	Yes	Yes
Papers	Yes	?	Yes	Yes
Pybliographer	?	?	?	?
refbase	Yes	?	Yes	Yes
RefDB	Yes	?	Yes	Yes
RefWorks	Yes	?	?	Yes
Zotero	Yes (Note: via zotero.org.)	?	Yes	Yes

== Discontinued software ==
Software	Developer	First public release	Latest stable release date	Latest stable version	Cost (USD)	Free software	License	Notes
Bebop	ALaRI Institute	2007-11-08	2009-11-10	1.1	Free	Yes	BSD	Web-based BibTeX front-end (Apache, PHP, MySQL)
Biblioscape	CG Information	1997	2015-06-22	10.0.3.6	US$79-299	No	Proprietary	ODBC; web access in Pro ed; optional client/server; discontinued?
CiteULike	Oversity Limited	2004-11	Shut down on 2019-03-30		Free	No	Proprietary (Note: A developer kit is available. The community is invited to create plugins to access data off databases.)	Centrally hosted website
colwiz	colwiz Ltd	2011	2016-05-09		Free / Online storage free up to 3 GB / Additional storage space available	No	Proprietary	Now combined with wizdom.ai
Pybliographer	pybliographer developers	1998-10-30 (0.2)	2018-04-03	1.4.0	Free	Yes	GNU GPL	Python/GTK2
Qiqqa	Qiqqa	2010-04	2020-10-04	v80	Free	Yes	GNU GPL	From end 2020, Open Source
Reference Manager	Thomson Reuters	1984	2010	12.0.3	Not for sale anymore, sales ceased December 31, 2015	No	Proprietary	Network version; built-in web publishing tool; discontinued
Referencer	Referencer developers	2008-03-15	Discontinued	1.2.2	Free	Yes	GNU GPL	BibTeX front-end
RefME	RefME	2014	Shut down in 2017		Free	No	Proprietary	Web, iOS and Android; Chrome and Safari Extensions available; discontinued
SciRef	Scientific Programs	2012	2020-07-30	1.6.2	US$38.90 / Free trial version	No	Proprietary	
WizFolio	WizPatent	2008-06	Shut down in 2017	Avatara	US$25 / Free Basic version	No	Proprietary	Centrally hosted website; discontinued
