= CiteULike =

Reference management website (2004–2019)

- Creator: Richard Cameron
- Launched: November 2004; 21 years ago
- Current status: Offline since March 28, 2019; 7 years ago
- Written in: Tcl
- OCLC number: 231383903

CiteULike was a web service which allowed users to save and share citations to academic papers. Based on the principle of social bookmarking, the site worked to promote and to develop the sharing of scientific references amongst researchers. In the same way that it is possible to catalog web pages (with Furl and delicious) or photographs (with Flickr), scientists could share citation information using CiteULike. Richard Cameron developed CiteULike in November 2004 and in 2006 Oversity Ltd. was established to develop and support CiteULike. In February 2019, CiteULike announced that it would be ceasing operations as of 30 March 2019.

When browsing issues of research journals, small scripts stored in bookmarks (bookmarklets) allowed one to import articles from repositories like PubMed, and CiteULike supported many more. Then the system attempted to determine the article metadata (title, authors, journal name, etc.) automatically. Users could organize their libraries with freely chosen tags and this produces a folksonomy of academic interests.

== Basic principles ==
Initially, one added a reference to CiteULike directly from within a web browser, without needing a separate program. For common online databases like PubMed, author names, title, and other details were imported automatically. One could manually add tags for grouping of references. The web site could be used to search public references by all users or only one's own references. References could later be exported via BibTeX or EndNote to be used on local computers.

=== Creation of entries and definition of keywords ===
CiteULike provided bookmarklets to quickly add references from the web pages of the most common sites. These small scripts read the citation information from the web page and imported into the CiteULike database for the currently logged in user.

Sites supported for semi-automatic import included Amazon.com, arXiv.org, JSTOR, PLoS, PubMed, SpringerLink, and ScienceDirect. It was also possible although more time-consuming to add entries manually.

Entries could be tagged for easier retrieval and organisation. More frequent tags were displayed in a proportionally larger font. Tags could be clicked to call up articles containing this tag.

=== Sharing and exporting entries ===
New entries were added as public by default, which made them accessible to everyone. Entries could be added as private and were then only available to the specific user. Users of CiteULike thus automatically shared all their public entries with other users. The tags assigned to public entries contributed to the site-wide tag network. All public references could also be searched and filtered by tag.

In addition, the site provided groups that users could join themselves or by invitation. Groups were typically labs, institutions, professions, or research areas.

On line CiteULike entries could be downloaded to a local computer by means of export functions. One export format was BibTeX, the referencing system used in TeX and LaTeX. The BibTeX output could also be imported directly into Overleaf. The RIS file format was also available for commercial bibliography programs such as EndNote or Reference Manager. It also allowed import into the free Zotero bibliography extension of Firefox. Export was possible for individual entries or the entire library.

CiteULike gave access to personal or shared bibliographies directly from the web. It allowed one to see what other people had posted publicly, which tags they had added, and how they had commented and rated a paper. It was also possible to browse the public libraries of people with similar interests to discover interesting papers. Groups allowed individual users to collaborate with other users to build a library of references. The data were backed up daily from the central server.

== Software ==
CiteULike was written in Tcl, with user contributed plugins in Python, Perl, Ruby and Tcl; some additional modules were written in Java; data were stored using PostgreSQL There was no API but plugins could be contributed using Subversion. The software behind the service was closed source, but the dataset collected by the users was in the public domain.

== About the site ==
The site stemmed from personal scientific requirements. The initial author found existing bibliography software cumbersome.

CiteULike was created in November 2004 and further developed in December 2006, running until March 2019. The site was based in the UK. The service was free and was run independently of any particular publisher with a liberal privacy policy.

== See also ==
- Reference management software
- Comparison of reference management software
- Social media
