= Refbase =

refbase

- refbase index page
- Developer: Richard Karnesky Michael Bartz Matthias Steffens
- Initial release: October 13, 2002; 23 years ago
- Stable release: 0.9.6 / November 14, 2021; 4 years ago
- Written in: PHP
- Operating system: Cross-platform
- Available in: French, English, Chinese (Traditional), Chinese (Simplified), German, Japanese, Russian
- Type: Reference management software
- License: GPL
- Website: refbase
- Repository: svn.code.sf.net/p/refbase/code/

refbase is a web-based institutional repository and reference management software written in PHP and using MySQL as a back-end database. It is available under the terms of the GPL license and its packages are featured in the official repositories of Gentoo Linux and Mandriva Linux.

refbase can be used to collect and share digital copies of publications such as an academic institution's research output. refbase has also been used as a publication archive, for example, the Washington State University did use refbase to provide access to its collection of the Pullman Herald newspaper.

refbase has been cited as one of the first web-based open-source tools to facilitate collaborative reference management.

== Features ==
- Import/export of multiple bibliographic formats, including BibTeX, EndNote, RIS, ISI, MODS XML, PubMed, Medline, RefWorks, and Copac.
- Generating formatted bibliographies and citations in LaTeX, RTF, HTML, and PDF.
- Advanced search features and generation of RSS feeds from searches.
- Adding links using DOIs and URLs as well as links to files.
- Support for Search/Retrieve via URL (SRU) and OpenSearch web services.
- Support for COinS and unAPI metadata.

== See also ==
- Comparison of reference management software
- List of free and open source software packages
