= BibBase =

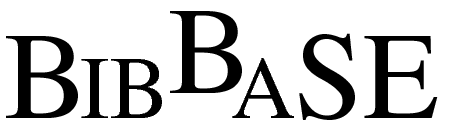

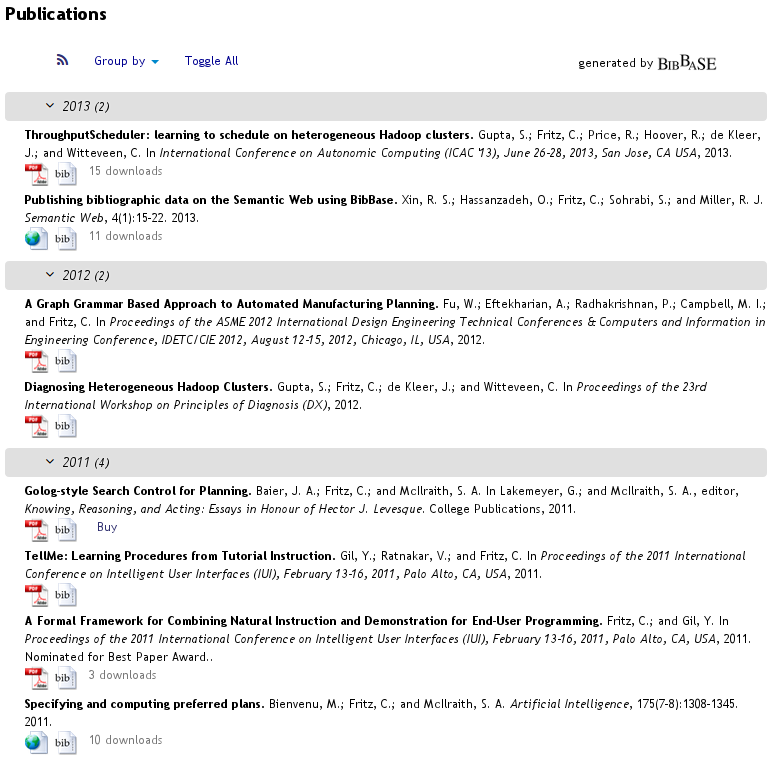
- A publications list generated by BibBase.
- Developer: Christian Fritz
- Release: 2005; 21 years ago
- Type: Reference management
- Website: bibbase.org

BibBase is a free web-service for creating and maintaining publication pages. BibBase takes its input from a BibTeX file or from DBLP, Zotero, BibSonomy, or Mendeley. It produces both HTML renderings, which can be embedded into an existing web page, as well as RSS feeds that allows others to subscribe to updates about new publications from the user.

It can publish "semantically annotated metadata" for papers. Ullah, et al. note the shortcomings of BibBase's adherence to Law of Demeter principles when language translation is taken into account.

== See also ==
- Comparison of reference management software
