= RefME =

- Developer: RefME
- Available in: English
- Type: Reference management software
- License: Proprietary
- Website: refme.com

RefME was a free citation management tool available on web, iOS and Android. It offered a functionality that allowed users to scan book and journal barcodes with a mobile device and generate citations automatically. It was compatible with other citation management tools such as Mendeley, Zotero, RefWorks, and EndNote and enables exporting in over 7000 citation styles. In May 2015, the company released a Chrome plug-in to allow for direct clipping of web sources, which was followed in August 2015 by a similar iOS extension. RefME was shut down on March 7, 2017, after being acquired by the education company Chegg, Inc.

== History ==
RefME was founded 2014 by Tom Hatton, Ian Forshew, and Tom Gardiner It was based in London and had over a million registered users. In April 2015, it was announced that GEMS Education had invested $5 million (£2.7) in the company’s seed investment round.

In 2017, RefMe was acquired by Chegg, Inc. and RefMe user accounts were transferred over to CiteThisForMe, Chegg's own citation service.

== Features ==
RefME was a free service that required registration to use. Registration could be performed by email, Facebook single sign on, or via Edmodo. It was available on Desktop (Windows, macOS and Linux) via the RefME.com web platform, iOS (for iPhones and iPads), Android and Google Chrome via the RefME WebClipper browser extension.

RefME allowed sharing and collaborating on resources, adding information through both desktop and mobile devices with cloud synchronization between platforms. The tool also allowed for citations to be exported into other tools as well as batch-importing using Ris files.

The mobile apps also offered a feature that allowed users to scan books with their smartphones and turn them automatically into citations.

== Awards ==
In October 2014, RefME was selected as one of the nineteen fastest-growing startups to participate in the Great Enterprise Tech Expedition organised by the UK Trade and Investment (UKTI) to showcase UK technology in the US.

RefME was named 2014 Startup of the Year by The Guardian and in March 2015 was voted Best British Mobile Startup at the Mobile World Congress (MWC) and also received the EdTech20 award in June 2015.

== See also ==
- Comparison of reference management software
