= RefDB =

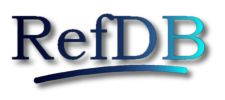
- Developer: RefDB development team
- Stable release: 1.0.3 / 2022-02-13
- Repository: svn.code.sf.net/p/refdb/code/
- Operating system: Cross-platform
- Type: Reference management software, Citation creator
- License: GPL
- Website: RefDB

RefDB is a client/server reference database and bibliography tool for markup languages like SGML, XML, and LaTeX. It is suitable for standalone use for the purpose of self-archiving, but can be used as an institutional repository as well. Data storage proper is done in one of several supported SQL database engines. RefDB runs on Unix-like operating systems (Linux, FreeBSD, NetBSD, Mac OS X, Solaris) and on Windows/Cygwin. RefDB is licensed under the GPL.

The data storage is managed by an application server accessed through command-line clients with a query language, a PHP-based web interface, a SRU interface, or by custom programs using one of the available client libraries.

RefDB supports such bibliographic formats as BibTeX, Endnote, RIS, ISI, MODS XML, PubMed, Medline, MARC, and Copac and can create output in these formats, or as TEI, DocBook, HTML, or XHTML documents. RefDB can process DocBook, TEI, or LaTeX documents and automatically insert and format bibliographies according to the specifications of a journal or a publisher.

Text editor extensions are provided for Emacs and for Vim to integrate editing, searching, and citing references as well as transforming your documents into your familiar XML, SGML, or LaTeX authoring environment.

== See also ==
Comparison of reference management software
