= Referencer =

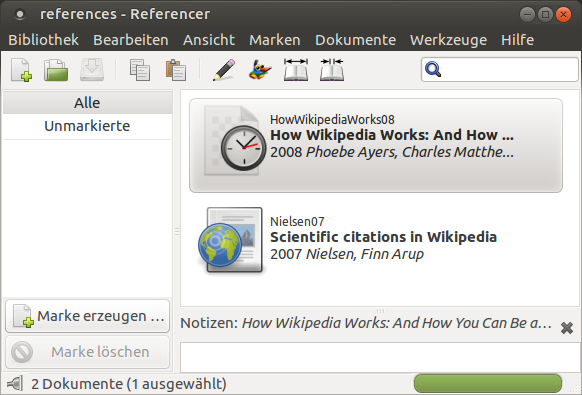
- Original author(s): John Spray
- Developer(s): referencer developers team
- Stable release: 1.2.2 / February 27, 2014; 11 years ago
- Operating system: Linux
- Type: Bibliography manager, Document organizer
- License: GPL
- Website: Official website

Referencer is a GNOME application to organize documents or references, and ultimately generate a BibTeX bibliography file. It is designed with the scientist/researcher in mind, and "document" may be taken to mean "paper" in general, although Referencer can deal with any kind of document that BibTeX can. Chief among Referencer's capabilities is the automatic acquisition of bibliographic information (metadata) for some kinds of documents. Upon adding a PDF file to a Referencer library file, it will automatically be searched for key identifiers such as a DOI code or arXiv identifier. If either of these is found, Referencer will attempt to retrieve the metadata for the document via the internet. However, metadata fetching for newer additions to arXiv is broken because of the change of format.

== Features ==
- Smart web links: Referencer uses documents' metadata to provide links to the document's web location
- Import from BibTeX, Reference Manager and EndNote
- Tagging of documents
- Referencer will automatically retrieve arXiv, PubMed and CrossRef metadata for PDF documents which have arXiv ID or DOI code
- Python plugin support: Referencer can be extended using the Python scripting language
- Referencer is translated into many languages

== See also ==
- Comparison of reference management software
