= SciRef =

Academic reference management software

- Developer(s): Scientific Programs
- Initial release: 2012
- Stable release: 1.6.1 / April 21, 2020
- Operating system: Windows
- Type: reference management software
- License: proprietary
- Website: Scientific Programs

SciRef is an academic reference manager for Windows. SciRef can retrieve references from sources like ScienceDirect, PubMed and any site supporting the export to RIS (file format). SciRef also is used to collect and manage related material, such as PDF files. SciRef can format bibliographies in many common formats. SciRef directly works with Microsoft Word.

== See also ==
- Comparison of reference management software for some comparisons with similar packages.
