= KBibTeX =

Reference manager software

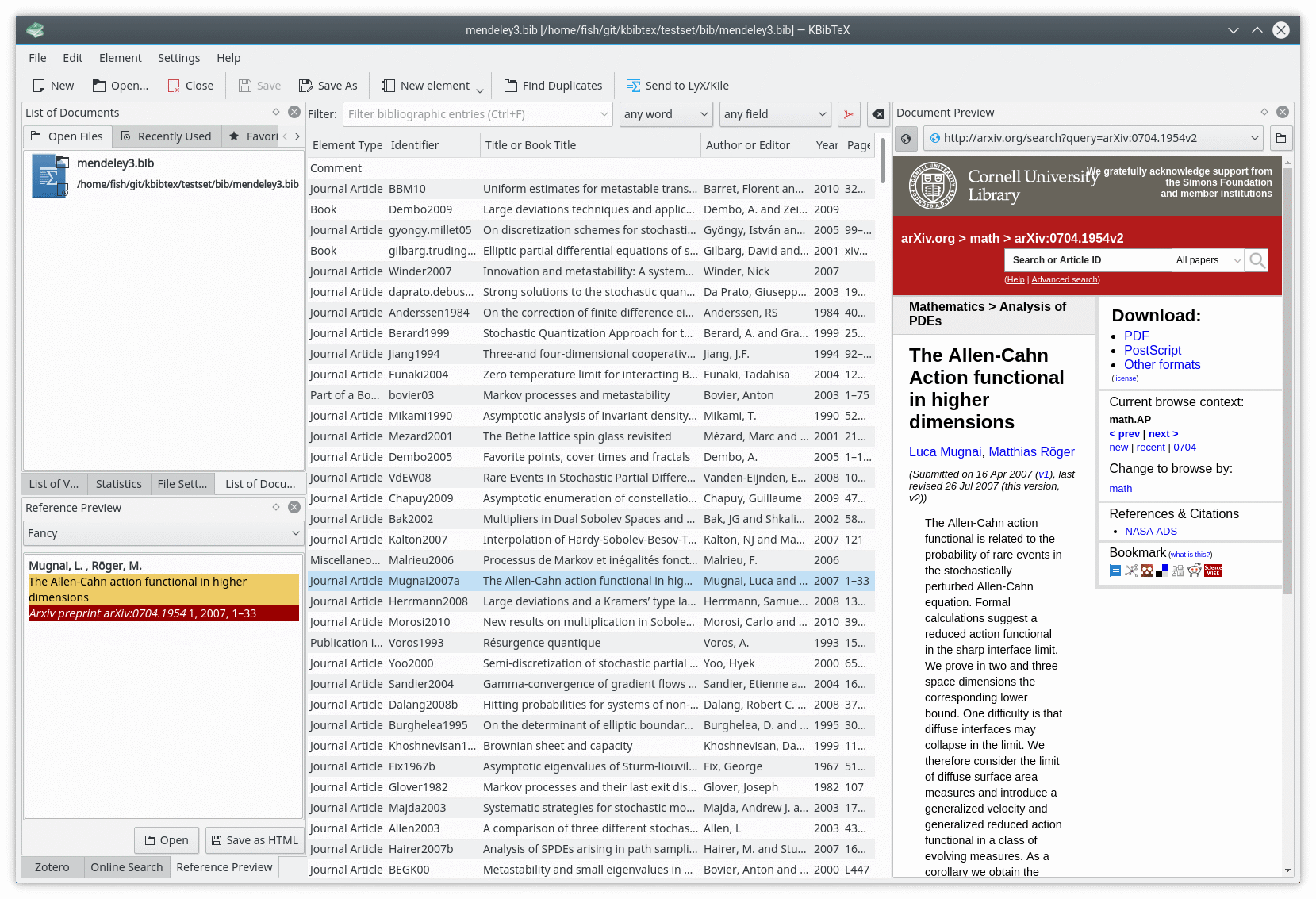
- KBibTeX
- Developer: Community
- Stable release: 0.10.0 / 18 March 2023; 2 years ago
- Repository: invent.kde.org/office/kbibtex
- Written in: C++ (KDELibs, Qt)
- Operating system: Cross-platform
- Available in: Multilingual
- Type: Reference management software
- License: GPL
- Website: userbase.kde.org/KBibTeX

KBibTeX is a reference management software primarily for BibTeX which is typically used in conjunction with TeX/LaTeX. Beyond normal editing capabilities, it offers features such as searching and importing new references from Google Scholar or BibSonomy.

KBibTeX uses KDE but is not part of the official KDE Software Compilation or Calligra. There exist two versions of KBibTeX: One that is built on KDE Platform 4, and another built on KDE Frameworks 5. KBibTeX was started in 2004 for KDE3. Its online documentation is hosted on a KDE server along with a copy in Portable Document Format for the purpose of offline reading.

== See also ==
- Comparison of reference management software
