= CiteProc =

Bibliography and reference software specification

CiteProc is the generic name for programs that produce formatted bibliographies and citations based on the metadata of the cited objects and the formatting instructions provided by Citation Style Language (CSL) styles. The first CiteProc implementation used XSLT 2.0, but implementations have been written for other programming languages, including JavaScript, Java, Haskell, PHP, Python, Ruby and Emacs Lisp.

CiteProc, CSL, and Cite Schema make up the Citation Style Language project, a Creative Commons Attribution Share-Alike licensed effort "to provide a common framework for formatting bibliographies and citations across markup languages and document standards. In an ideal world, one could use the same CSL files to format DocBook, TEI, OpenOffice, WordML ... or even LaTeX documents.

Different implementations of CiteProc are able to use different bibliographic databases; many can use MODS XML.

== Notable applications that support CiteProc ==
- BibSonomy
- Mendeley
- Pandoc
- Papers
- Qiqqa
- RefME
- Zotero
