= Pybliographer =

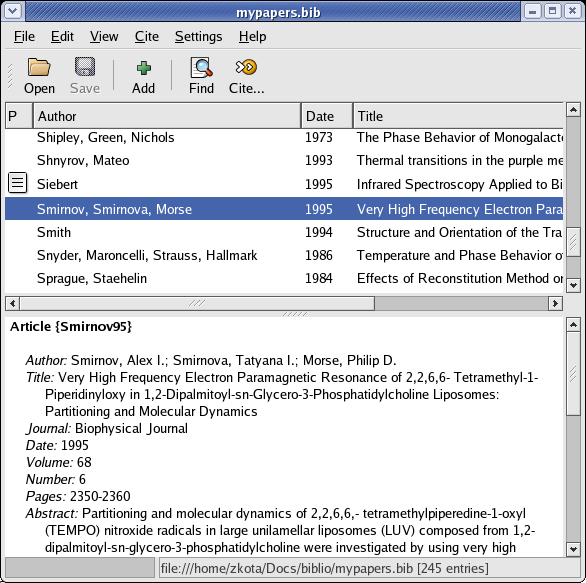
- Pybliographer 1.2.14
- Original author: Frédéric Gobry
- Developer: The Pybliographer Team
- Initial release: 13 October 1998 (27 years ago)
- Stable release: 1.4.0 / 3 April 2018 (7 years ago)
- Repository: gitlab.gnome.org/GNOME/pybliographer.git
- Written in: Python
- Operating system: Linux
- Type: reference management software
- License: GNU GPLv2
- Website: www.pybliographer.org

Pybliographer is a reference management software tool that deals with bibliographic databases, used for viewing, editing, searching, and reformatting bibliographies. Written in Python and licensed under GNU GPL, it provides a scripting framework of classes and functions, which makes it extendable to many other applications. Documentation is available.

In addition to the scripting environment, pybliographer provides a graphical GTK+-based interface called Pybliographic, allowing many customizable viewing and editing possibilities. The interface can also be used to insert references directly into LyX, Kile or OpenOffice.org, direct queries to Medline, and more.

== File formats supported ==
- BibTeX
- ISI
- Medline
- Ovid
- PubMed
- Refer

== See also ==
- Comparison of reference management software
