= ProCite =

Discontinued bibliographic software

- Developers: Personal Bibliographic Software, Thomson Reuters
- Final release: 5 / October 26, 1999 (Windows) and September 25, 2001 (Macintosh)
- Operating system: Microsoft Windows, Mac OS X
- Type: Reference management
- License: Proprietary

ProCite, a commercial reference management software program, was designed in the early 1980s by Victor Rosenberg, associate professor in the School of Library and Information Studies at the University of Michigan, Ann Arbor. ProCite was published in 1983 by Personal Bibliographic Software of Ann Arbor, Michigan. In 1996, ProCite was purchased by the Institute for Scientific Information, a division of Thomson Reuters. Thomson Reuters discontinued sales and support of ProCite in May 2013.

Since 2013, ProCite can be migrated to EndNote by Clarivate Analytics.

ProCite versions 1.x and 2.x ran on computers using the PC DOS and MS-DOS operating systems. In 1987, Science published a review of the DOS version of ProCite, along with four other reference manager programs.

ProCite versions 3.x-5.x ran on Microsoft Windows. Version 3.0 for Windows was released in 1995.

Macintosh versions were also published.

ProCite 3.1 and later versions included a Z39.50 client for searching and downloading records from library catalogs and other databases providing a Z39.50 server.

ProCite was popular among librarians because the program had features designed for the production of scholar bibliographies.

Archives of the former ProCite discussion list, 1995–2008, were available at the Adept Science website in April 2014.

== See also ==
- Comparison of reference management software
