= WizFolio =

Web-based reference management software

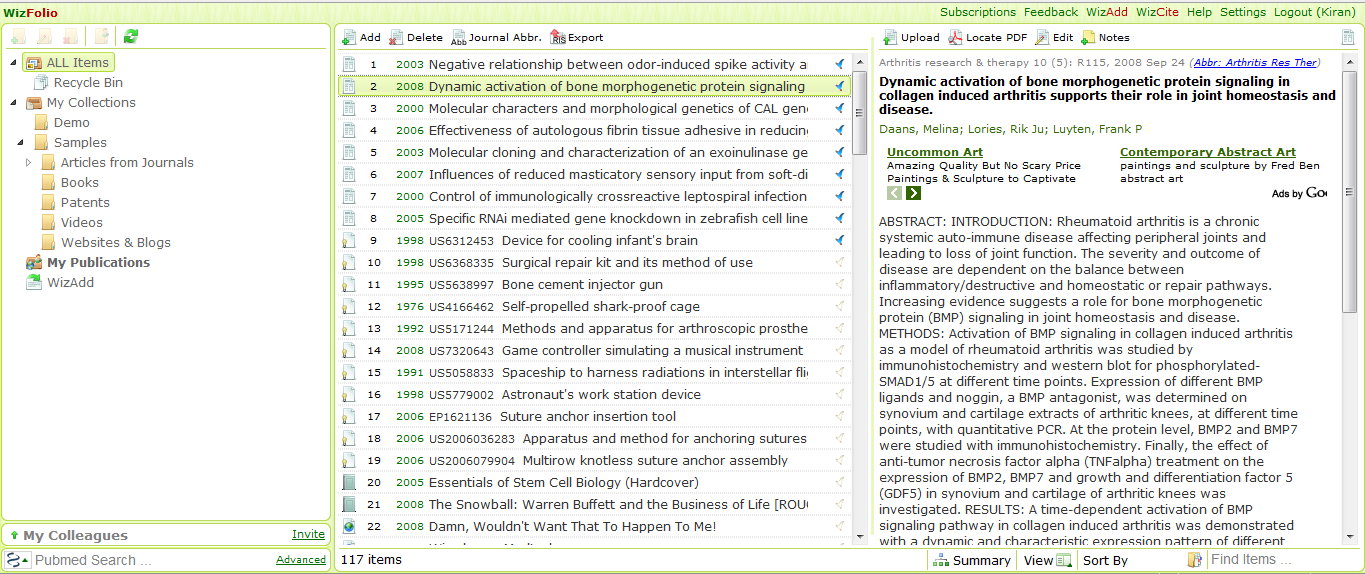
- Web-based reference management (WizFolio Interface)
- Developer: WizPatent Pte Ltd.
- Stable release: Version Avatara / January 2011; 14 years ago
- Operating system: Cross-platform
- Available in: English, Japanese, Korean, Thai, Simplified and Traditional Chinese
- Type: Information management on the cloud in a citation ready format
- License: Proprietary
- Website: WizFolio

WizFolio was a web-based reference management software for researchers to manage, share their research and academic papers and generate citations in scholarly writings. It used plug-ins (HTML parsing technology) to collect bibliographic information, videos, and patents from webpages. WizFolio ceased to be available at the end of 2017.

== History ==
Developed by WizPatent Pte Ltd, its alpha version was launched on 12 May 2008, and the beta on 22 June 2008. It has since been released officially and is opened to the general public. During the 8th International Conference on Bioinformatics (InCOB), Lim Chuan Poh, chairman of Agency for Science, Technology and Research (A*STAR) announced that the Asia-Pacific Bioinformatics Network (APBioNet) and Association for Medical and Bio Informatics Singapore (AMBIS) signed an agreement with WizFolio to provide respective members access to the system as well as explore new ways to improve the process of scientific peer review activities.

In January 2015, Wizfolio was acquired by iGroup (Asia Pacific) Ltd.

In March 2016, iGroup (Asia Pacific) Ltd. released EEWOWW, a new authoring tool built upon on Wizfolio. Wizfolio was retired at end of 2017.

== Features ==
These were the WizFolio Features as listed on the WizFolio website.

- Cross platform: WizFolio supported all the latest versions of Mac, Windows and Linux.
- Browsers: Worked on all major browsers such as Internet Explorer, Firefox, Safari and Chrome.
- Import (WizAdd): Imported bibliographic data directly from over 200 scientific publishers (IEEE, Springer Wiley, Nature, Science) and databases (Google Scholar, Scopus, ISI, JSTOR, Proquest, etc.). Also automatically imported free PDFs into your online collection.
- Cite: Collaborative citing across OS and document formats with patent pending citation technology. Have plugins for Microsoft Word (Win), OpenOffice (Win, Mac, Linux), Google Docs, Google Sites, Zoho Writer and WordPress.
- Searched: Search Pubmed, Google Books, YouTube, Bing, Amazon Books within WizFolio.
- Organized: Folders, Flags, Tags, and Notes and on-the-fly handling of duplicates.
- Uploaded: WizFolio attempted to get the bibliographic data when you batch upload your PDF's and documents.
- Share: Drag-n-Drop share. Publicize research work using the WizFolio Profile page, Email, Twitter or Facebook.
- Transfer: WizImporter for transfer from Zotero & Mendeley, and RIS files for Endnote & Refworks.
- Locate: Locate PDF for the top open access journals and linkage to over 350 universities' library subscriptions.

== iPad version ==
The company announced the release of its iPad version on 26 July 2010.

== Compatibility with word processors ==
WizCite, the system's citation tool, is compatible with Microsoft Word (Windows), OpenOffice.org (Windows, Mac, Linux), and Zoho Writer.

WizFolio used to be compatible with Google Docs until 12 April 2010 when Google Docs update broke the integration.

== Trial with Scholars Portal ==
Scholars Portal, a consortium of 21 university libraries in Canada, began a trial of the system in early 2010.

== See also ==
- Comparison of reference management software
