= RefTeX =

RefTeX is a reference management software package designed for use with Emacs and BibTeX. While it can cooperate effectively with the popular AUCTeX package, it is not strictly necessary to use them together.

RefTeX obviates the need to tediously search through different parts of a LaTeX document and associated BibTeX files when using cross-referencing macros such as \label, \ref, \cite, and \index. It also provides an interface for visualizing and quickly navigating a LaTeX document's structure.

RefTeX is distributed under the GNU General Public License. It was originally written by Carsten Dominik, the author of org-mode and CDLaTeX, with contributions by Stephen Eglen, and is currently maintained by the AUCTeX project. It has been bundled and pre-installed with Emacs since version 20.2.
