= Stefan Seuring =

German professor

Stefan Seuring (born in 1967 in Fulda) is a German economist and university professor. Since 2011, he has been heading the Supply Chain Management department at the University of Kassel.

== Biography ==
Seuring studied among others business administration in Stuttgart and chemistry in Bayreuth and Bristol. He holds a Master of Science degree in chemistry from the University of Bristol, as well as a Master of Science degree in Business in the Environment from the University of Kent at Canterbury. He received his doctorate and habilitation from the Carl von Ossietzky University of Oldenburg. In 2004, he was a visiting professor at the Copenhagen Business School.

== Work ==
Seuring is considered to be an influential scientist, especially in the field of sustainability in supply chain management. An article written by Seuring and Martin Müller with over 70,000 hits is the most frequently accessed article written by Germans at ScienceDirect in the Physical Science category since 2005. Two further articles by Seuring are listed among the 100 most frequently accessed articles in the Social Sciences and Economics category. Seuring's name was also mentioned in the Handelsblatt Betriebswirte-Ranking 2012 and 2014, which lists the 250 most influential German-speaking business administration professors in terms of publication success (life's work).

In 2016, Seuring was named in the list of the 27 most influential scientists in logistics and supply chain management drawn up by French scientists. The criterion for the inclusion was that the research work was considered to be globally trend-setting. Seuring is particularly honored for his research work at the interface of sustainability and supply chain management. The work was characterised by the fact that it did not take up individual aspects of the topic of sustainability, but rather developed an approach that places both environmental problems and social challenges equally in the focus of the management of global value chains. Seuring is the only German scientist on the list and one of only seven Europeans.

In 2018, 2019 and 2020, he was named in the list of the Highly Cited Researchers by Clarivate Analytics, which lists below 6,500 scientists worldwide whose scientific work is regarded as particularly influential. This was determined on the basis of publications listed in the Web of Science, which belong to the top 1% cited contributions in the respective research field. In September 2020, he was also listed in the Ökonomenranking of the Frankfurter Allgemeine Zeitung in the category science, among the top 10 cited researchers in business and economics from Austria, Germany and Switzerland.

- S. Seuring, M. Müller: From a literature review to a conceptual framework for sustainable supply chain management. Journal of Cleaner Production, 2008, 16 (15), pp. 1699–1710.

Further publications can be found on Google Scholar.

== See also ==
- Web of Science
