= Bebop (disambiguation) =

Bebop is a type of jazz music.

BeBop may also refer to:

- Be-Bop?, a 1979 album by saxophonist Pepper Adams and drummer Barry Altschul
- BeBopBeBopBeBopBeBop, a 1989 album by pianist Paul Bley
- Love Bebop, a 2016 album by Misia
- Bebop and Rocksteady, characters in Teenage Mutant Ninja Turtles
- Bebop (software), BibTeX publisher
- BeBop, the main ship from the animated series Cowboy Bebop
- Parrot Bebop, a French camera drone
- "Bebop" (song), by Julian Lennon

== Acronyms ==
- Binaries Escorted By Orbiting Planets, an exoplanet search project
