= Reference Manager =

Reference management software

- Developers: Research Information Systems, later acquired by Thomson ISI ResearchSoft
- Initial release: 1984 (42 years ago)
- Stable release: 12 / 02-09-2008
- Operating system: CP/M; MS-DOS; Windows; Macintosh
- Available in: English
- Type: Reference management
- License: Proprietary
- Website: www.refman.com

Reference Manager was the first commercial reference management software package sold by Thomson Reuters. It was the first commercial software of its kind, originally developed by Ernest Beutler and his son, Earl Beutler, in 1982 through their company Research Information Systems. Offered for the CP/M operating system, it was ported to MS-DOS, then Windows, and later Macintosh. Research Information Systems was acquired by Thomson Business Information (later Thomson Reuters) in 1994. Subsequently, Thomson acquired EndNote and ProCite, the other two leading bibliographic management programs. Rich Niles, founder of EndNote, joined Thomson Reuters as head of that division, and put all development focus on EndNote. Sales of Reference Manager continued until December 31, 2015, and support ended on December 31, 2016.

== Operation ==
Reference Manager is most commonly used by people who want to share a central database of references and need to have multiple users adding and editing records at the same time. It is possible to specify for each user read-only or edit rights to the database. The competing package EndNote does not offer this functionality.

Reference Manager offers different in-text citation templates for each reference type. It also allows the use of synonyms within a database. Reference Manager Web Publisher allows the publication of reference databases to an intranet or internet site. This allows anyone with a web browser to search and download references into their own bibliographic software. It includes the functionality to interact with the SOAP and WSDL standard services.

Research Information Systems also created the "RIS Format" which is now a standard for interchange of bibliographic information.

== Updates ==
After abandoning the development of Reference Manager in 2008, Thomson Reuters discontinued its sale on December 31, 2015, to focus exclusively on EndNote. In 2018, the Science division, which owned EndNote, separated from Thomson Reuters to become Clarivate. EndNote X7 can import Reference Manager databases and convert Word documents formatted with Reference Manager into EndNote formatting.

== See also ==
- Comparison of reference management software
- EndNote
- RIS format
