= UnAPI =

According to its website, an unAPI is:

a tiny HTTP API any web application may use to co-publish discretely identified objects in both HTML pages and disparate bare object formats. It consists of three parts: an identifier microformat, an HTML autodiscovery link, and three HTTP interface functions, two of which have a standardized response format.

The unAPI specification is only two pages long.

== Server-side applications which use unAPI ==
- Bebop
- Evergreen
- Koha
- refbase
- WordPress (via a plugin)
- VITAL, digital repository
- invenio digital library framework
- Omeka S, web-publishing platform for academic and cultural repositories
- Glottolog a clld app supports unAPI on its root page.

== Client tools which can use unAPI ==
- Zotero

== See also ==
- COinS
