= Biblioscape =

Research management software

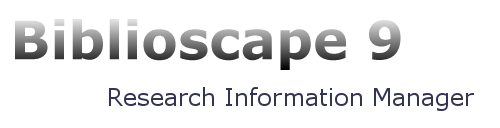
- Developer: CG Information
- Stable release: 10.0.3.6 / June 22, 2015
- Operating system: Windows
- Type: Bibliography manager
- License: Commercial
- Website: biblioscape.com

Biblioscape is a commercial information and reference management software package sold by CG Information. The software runs only under Windows.

== History ==
Biblioscape was first released in 1998. The current release, version 10.0.3, was made available in June 2015. Version 10 was in beta testing as of March 2013.

== Features ==
Biblioscape is a reference management software. It has modules that allow the user to record and interlink references, notes, tasks, charts, and categories. Any of these can also be linked to web pages or other external resources. Records can be organized in folders or collections and tagged with categories.

== See also ==
- Comparison of reference management software
