= Collection of Computer Science Bibliographies =

Bibliographic database

The Collection of Computer Science Bibliographies (1993–2023) was one of the oldest (if not the oldest) bibliography collections freely accessible on the Internet. As of July 2023 it ceased operations. It is a collection of bibliographies of scientific literature in computer science and (computational) mathematics from various sources, covering most aspects of computer science. The bibliographies are updated weekly from their original locations.

As of 2009 the collection contains more than 2.8 million unique references (mostly to journal articles, conference papers and technical reports), clustered in about 1700 bibliographies, and consists of more than 4.4 Gb (950 Mb gzipped) of BibTeX entries. More than 600,000 references contain cross-references to citing or cited publications.

More than 1 million references contain URLs to online versions of the papers. Abstracts are available for more than 1 million entries. There are more than 2,000 links to other sites carrying bibliographic information.

== Duplicates and links ==
As the Collection of Computer Science Bibliographies consists of many subcollections there is a substantial overlap (roughly 1/3). At the end of 2008 there were more than 4.2 million records which represent about 2.8 million unique (in terms of normalized title and authors' last names) bibliographic entries.

The number of duplicates may be seen as an advantage, because there is a greater chance for finding a freely available full text PDF of a searched publication. Publications are clustered by title and last names of authors, so it is possible to find an extended version (e.g. Technical Report or Thesis) of an article.

There are also generated links to Google Scholar and IEEE Xplore in cases where no full text link was available directly. Almost every bibliographic query may be served in RSS format.

== Major subcollections ==
- arXiv
- Bibliography Network Project
- CiteSeerX
- DBLP
- LEABib
- Networked Computer Science Technical Reference Library

== History ==
The collection was started in 1993 by Alf-Christian Achilles with a simple email-based interface and limited number of entries. One year later the first web interface has been made available. Since then the Collection was maintained by Achilles in his spare time. At the end of 2002 the maintenance has been handed over to Paul Ortyl. As of August 2023, the service has been discontinued, the URL (domain name) has been dropped by KIT and the user interest in the service was vanishingly small.
