= Biber (LaTeX) =

Bibliography information processing program

- Original author(s): Philip Kime and François Charette
- Developer(s): Philip Kime, Ken Brown, Nikola Lečić, François Charette, moewe, Alexander Krumeich, Boris Veytsman, Apostolos Syropoulos
- Stable release: 2.20 / 21 March 2024; 11 months ago
- Repository: github.com/plk/biber
- Written in: Perl
- Platform: Cross-platform
- Available in: English
- License: Artistic License 2.0
- Website: Official website

Biber is a bibliography information processing program that works in conjunction with the LaTeX package BibLaTeX and offers full Unicode support.

Biber is a widely used replacement for the BibTeX software. Both generate a bibliography in LaTeX, but Biber offers a large superset of BibTeX functionality. It also offers full Unicode support, which is hard to achieve with BibTeX. Given the same data file as input, biber should output a functionally identical .bbl file as BibTeX.

Biber is written in Perl and includes the following features:

- full Unicode support
- user-definable mapping and suppression of fields
- multiple bibliography lists
- no memory limitations, and extensibility.

Some LaTeX packages have an explicit dependence on BibTeX itself and will not work with biber. The most important example is natbib, which provides style options for citation references. However, natbib functionality can largely be recovered by using the natbib option to BibLaTeX, which is the LaTeX package for processing citation references that is commonly used in conjunction with biber.
