= VITAL (asset management software) =

VITAL is a software suite of digital asset management products by VTLS based on the open source Fedora architecture.

It was unveiled at the 2004 American Library Association's Midwinter Meeting. Version 2.0 was released November 29, 2005 after acceptance testing by Australian Research Repositories Online to the World.

In 2014, VTLS was acquired by Innovative Interfaces
