= RefWorks =

Reference management software

- Developer: Clarivate
- Operating system: Web-based, OS-independent
- Type: Reference management
- License: Proprietary
- Website: www.refworks.com

RefWorks is a cloud-based commercial reference management software package. It is produced by Clarivate after it bought ProQuest in 2021. RefWorks LLC was founded in 2001 as a partnership between Earl B. Beutler (development and customer service) and Cambridge Scientific Abstracts (sales and marketing) from 2002 until being acquired by ProQuest in 2008.

In October 2026, Refworks became EndNote fusion.

== Functionality and features ==
Users' reference databases are stored online, allowing them to be accessed and updated from any computer with an internet connection. Institutional licenses allow universities to subscribe to RefWorks on behalf of all their students, faculty and staff. The software enables linking from a user's RefWorks account to electronic editions of journals to which the institution's library subscribes. This linking is accomplished by incorporating an institution's OpenURL resolver.

Many bibliographic database providers have implemented the ability to export references directly to RefWorks. In some cases (e.g. PubMed) reference citations must be saved to the user's computer as text files and then imported into RefWorks. In 2005 the bibliographic database Scopus formed a partnership with RefWorks to allow enhanced integration between the two products.

A word processor integration utility called RefWorks Citation Manager (RCM) enables users to insert reference codes from their RefWorks accounts into Microsoft Word documents, which can then be formatted to produce in-text citations and reference lists in various styles.

RefWorks includes Save to RefWorks, a utility designed to capture bibliographic information from websites. As of 2009, it was optimized to work with Amazon, Google Scholar, PubMed, Wikipedia, the BBC, USA Today, The New York Times, and the Los Angeles Times.

RefWorks-COS launched the current user interface, RefWorks 2.0, in 2010.

In 2016, ProQuest launched New RefWorks, featuring new functionality such as the ability to drag and drop PDFs. RefWorks 2.0 was rebranded as Legacy RefWorks and users were given the option of upgrading from Legacy to New RefWorks. Legacy RefWorks was decommissioned in 2023.

== See also ==
- Comparison of reference management software
- Office Open XML software
- OpenDocument software
