= BibTeX =

Reference management software for formatting lists of references

- Original authors: Oren Patashnik, Leslie Lamport
- Developer: Oren Patashnik
- Release: March 1985; 41 years ago
- Stable release: 0.99e / September 2025; 1 year ago
- Written in: WEB
- Platform: Cross-platform
- Included with: TeX Live
- Size: 384 KB
- Available in: English
- Type: Reference management software
- License: Knuth License
- Website: Official website
- Repository: https://tug.org/svn/texlive/trunk/Build/source/texk/web2c/

BibTeX, sometimes stylized as BibTeX (/ˈbɪb.tɛx/, /-tɛk/), is both a bibliographic flat-file database file format and a software program for processing these files to produce lists of references (citations). The BibTeX file format is a widely used standard with broad support by reference management software.

The BibTeX program comes bundled with the LaTeX document preparation system, and is not available as a stand-alone program. Within this typesetting system its name is styled as ${\mathrm{B{\scriptstyle{IB}} \! T\!_{\displaystyle E} \! X}}$. The name is a portmanteau of the word bibliography and the name of the TeX typesetting software.

BibTeX was created by Oren Patashnik in 1985. No updates were published between February 1988 and March 2010, when the package was updated to improve URL printing and clarify the license. There are various reimplementations of the program.

The purpose of BibTeX is to make it easy to cite sources in a consistent manner, by separating bibliographic information from the presentation of this information, similarly to the separation of content and presentation/style supported by LaTeX itself.

== Processor ==
The processor program works with several specific files to produce the reference list and format the citations. In the words of the program's author Oren Patashnik, the processor works as follows:

It takes as input:

1. an .aux file produced by LaTeX on an earlier run;
2. a .bst file (the style file), which specifies the general reference-list style and specifies how to format individual entries, and which is written by a style designer in a special-purpose language, and
3. .bib file(s) constituting a database of all reference-list entries the user might ever hope to use.

BibTeX chooses from the .bib file(s) only those entries specified by the .aux file (that is, those given by LaTeX's \cite or \nocite commands), and creates as output a .bbl file containing these entries together with the formatting commands specified by the .bst file. LaTeX will use the .bbl file, perhaps edited by the user, to produce the reference list.

=== History ===
BibTeX was created by Oren Patashnik and Leslie Lamport in 1985. The program is written in WEB/Pascal.

Version 0.98f was released in March 1985.

With version 0.99c (released February 1988), a stationary state was reached for 22 years.

In March 2010, version 0.99d was released to improve URL printing. Further releases were announced.

=== Reimplementations ===
BibTeXu
A reimplementation of bibtex (by Yannis Haralambous and his students) that supports the UTF-8 character set. Taco Hoekwater of the LuaTeX team criticized it in 2010 for poor documentation and for generating errors that are difficult to debug.
bibtex8
A reimplementation of bibtex that supports eight-bit character sets.
CL-BibTeX
A completely compatible reimplementation of bibtex in Common Lisp, capable of using bibtex .bst files directly or converting them into human-readable Lisp .lbst files. CL-BibTeX supports Unicode in Unicode Lisp implementations, using any character set that Lisp knows about.
MLBibTeX
A reimplementation of BibTeX focusing on multilingual features, by Jean-Michel Hufflen.
BibLaTeX
A complete reimplementation. "It redesigns the way in which LaTeX interacts with BibTeX at a fairly fundamental level. With biblatex, BibTeX is only used to sort the bibliography and to generate labels. Instead of being implemented in BibTeX's style files, the formatting of the bibliography is entirely controlled by TeX macros." It uses the bibliography processing program Biber and offers full Unicode and theming support. BibLaTeX comes with a new file format specification that uses the same syntax as the BibTeX file format but with more and different bibliographic entry types and field types, with aliases to the BibTeX types for some backward compatibility.
Bibulous
A drop-in BibTeX replacement based on style templates, including full Unicode support, written in Python.

== Database files ==
BibTeX uses a style-independent text-based file format, a kind of flat-file database, to store bibliography items, such as articles, books, and theses. BibTeX database file names usually end in .bib. A BibTeX database file is formed by a list of entries, with each entry corresponding to a bibliographical item. Entry types correspond to various types of bibliographic sources such as article, book, or conference.

An example entry describing a mathematical handbook is structured with an entry type—here, @book—followed by a unique citation key, such as abramowitz+stegun. It also includes a list of fields, like author and title:

@book{abramowitz+stegun,
 author    = "Milton {Abramowitz} and Irene A. {Stegun}",
 title     = "Handbook of Mathematical Functions with
              Formulas, Graphs, and Mathematical Tables",
 publisher = "Dover",
 year      =  1964,
 address   = "New York City",
 edition   = "ninth Dover printing, tenth GPO printing"
}

If a document references this handbook, the bibliographic information can be formatted in different ways depending on the chosen citation style (e.g., APA, MLA, Chicago). LaTeX handles this by specifying the citation command \cite, which addresses the citation key and relies on the desired bibliography style defined in the LaTeX document.

For example, if the command \cite{abramowitz+stegun} appears in a LaTeX document, the bibtex program will include this book in the list of references and generate appropriate LaTeX formatting code. When viewing the formatted LaTeX document, the result might look like this:

Abramowitz, Milton and Irene A. Stegun (1964), Handbook of mathematical functions with formulas, graphs, and mathematical tables. New York: Dover.

Depending on the style file, BibTeX may rearrange authors' last names, change the case of titles, omit fields present in the .bib file, format text in italics, add punctuation, etc. Since the same style file is used for an entire list of references, these are all formatted consistently with minimal effort required from authors or editors.

The bibclean program performs pretty-printing and syntax checking of BibTeX files.

== Style files ==
BibTeX formats bibliographic items according to a style file, typically by generating TeX or LaTeX formatting commands, but style files can also be used to generate other types of output like HTML. BibTeX style files commonly use the file extension .bst and are written in a simple, stack-based programming language (dubbed "BibTeX Anonymous Forth-Like Language", or "BAFLL", by Drew McDermott) that describes how bibliography items should be formatted. There are some packages that can generate .bst files automatically, such as custom-bib and Bib-it.

Most journals or publishers that support LaTeX use a customized bibliographic style file for the convenience of the authors, often included as part of a complete LaTeX template.

== Examples of uses ==
- Astrophysics Data System – The NASA ADS is an online database of over eight million astronomy and physics papers and provides BibTeX format citations.
- Bebop – a web-based front-end interface for BibTeX
- BibDesk – Open-source software application for macOS for creating, editing, managing, and searching BibTeX files.
- BibSonomy – A social bookmark and publication management system based on BibTeX.
- Citavi – Reference manager. Works with various TeX-Editors and supports BibTeX input and output.
- CiteSeer – An online database of research publications which can produce BibTeX format citations.
- CiteULike (discontinued) – A community based bibliography database that had BibTeX input and output.
- The Collection of Computer Science Bibliographies – uses BibTeX as internal data format, search results and contributions primarily in BibTeX.
- Connotea – Open-source social bookmark style publication management system.
- Digital Bibliography & Library Project – A bibliography website that lists more than 910,000 articles in the computer science field.
- Google AI – Housed within the artificial intelligence division of Google DeepMind is a compilation of publications by Google staff with BibTeX citation links.
- Google Books – The bibliographic information for each book is exportable in BibTeX format via the 'Export Citation' feature.
- Google Scholar – Google's system for searching scholarly literature provides BibTeX format citations if the option is enabled in 'Scholar Preferences'.
- HubMed – A versatile PubMed interface including BibTeX output.
- INSPIRE-HEP – The INSPIRE High-Energy Physics literature database provides BibTeX format citations for over one million high-energy physics papers.
- JabRef – Open-source cross-platform software application for creating, editing, managing, and searching BibTeX and BibLaTeX files.
- MathSciNet – Database by the American Mathematical Society (subscription), choose BibTeX in the "Select alternative format" box
- Mendeley – Reference manager, for collecting papers. It supports exporting collections into bib files and keep them synchronized with its own database.
- Paperpile – Reference manager, supports BibTeX input and output. BibTeX output can be customized.
- Pandoc – Open-source document converter that can read a BibTeX file and produce formatted citations in any bibliography style specified in a citation style language (CSL) file.
- Qiqqa – Software application for Windows that includes a fully featured BibTeX editor and validator, along with tools for automatically populating BibTeX records for PDFs.
- refbase – Open-source reference manager for institutional repositories and self archiving with BibTeX input and output.
- RefTeX – Emacs based reference manager.
- Wikipedia – Pressing cite this page in the Tools menu of an article provides a BibTeX format citation.
- Zentralblatt MATH – Database by the European Mathematical Society, FIZ Karlsruhe and Heidelberg Academy (subscription, 3 free entries); choose BibTeX button or format.
- Zotero – Open-source reference manager with advanced features such as synchronization between different computers, social bookmarking, searching inside saved PDFs and BibTeX output.

== See also ==
Data schemes

- EndNote – a text-based data scheme used by the EndNote program
- refer – an aging text-based data scheme supported on UNIX-like systems
- RIS – a text-based data scheme from Research Information Systems

Other

- Citation Style Language – a newer XML-based bibliography style specification analogous to BibTeX's .bst files but processed instead by the CiteProc program
- Comparison of reference management software
- List of TeX extensions
