= EndNote =

Reference management software package

- Original author: Niles Software
- Developer: Clarivate
- Stable release: 2025.3 (MacOS); 2025.3.1 (Windows) / January 30, 2026; 4 months ago
- Operating system: Windows, macOS
- Type: Reference management
- License: Closed-source and commercial software
- Website: endnote.com

EndNote is a commercial reference management software package, used to manage bibliographies and references when writing essays, reports and articles. EndNote was written by Richard Niles, and ownership changed hands several times since it was launched in 1989 by Niles & Associates: in 2000 it was acquired by Institute for Scientific Information’s ResearchSoft Division, part of Thomson Corporation, and in 2016 by Clarivate (then named Clarivate Analytics). EndNote's main competitors are Mendeley and Zotero.

== Features ==
EndNote groups citations into "libraries" with the file extension *.enl and a corresponding *.data folder.

There are several ways to add a reference to a library: manually, or by exporting, importing, copying from another EndNote library, or connecting from EndNote. When manually creating a reference, the program presents the user with a window containing a dropdown menu from which to select the type of reference they require (e.g., book, journal article, film, newspaper article, etc.), and fields ranging from the general (author, title, year) to those specific to the kind of reference (abstract, author, ISBN, running time, etc.)

Most bibliographic databases allow users to export references into their EndNote libraries. This enables the user to select multiple citations and saves the user from having to manually enter citation information and abstracts of papers. Some databases (e.g., PubMed) require the user to select citations, select a specific format, and save them as .NBIB or similar files. The user can then import the citations into the EndNote software. It is also possible to search library catalogs and databases, such as PubMed, from within the EndNote software program itself.

If the user fills out the necessary fields, EndNote can automatically format the citation into any of over 7,000 different styles the user chooses. For example, listed below are some citations from Gray's Anatomy using several different styles:

| Anthropos | Gray, Henry; 1910 Anatomy, descriptive and applied. Philadelphia: Lea & Febiger. |
| APA 7th | Gray, H. (1910). Anatomy, descriptive and applied (18th ed.). Lea & Febiger. |
| MLA 9th | Gray, Henry. Anatomy, Descriptive and Applied. 18th ed., Lea & Febiger, 1910. |
| New England J Medicine | 1. Gray H. Anatomy, descriptive and applied. 18th ed. Philadelphia: Lea & Febiger; 1910. |

EndNote creates a file with an *.enl extension, along with a *.data folder containing index files, and PDF attachments. EndNote's installation includes Cite While You Write, which appear as functions in the ribbon of Microsoft Word and OpenOffice.org Writer.

EndNote can export citation libraries as HTML, plain text, Rich Text Format, or XML. From version X.7.2, one library can be shared with up to 1000 other EndNote users. The data is synchronized via the EndNote cloud service, with everybody having read write, or read only access to the library.

EndNote can also organize PDFs on the user's hard drive (or full text on the web) through links to files or by inserting copies of PDFs. It is also possible to save images, documents, Excel spreadsheets, or other file types to each reference in an EndNote library. Starting from EndNote X version 1.0.1, formatting support for OpenDocument files (ODT) using the Format Paper command is supported.

EndNote can also find full-text PDFs on-line (for non–open access publications, subscription credentials are required) and import PDF files from user's computer, provided that the PDF files have a labelled DOI in the first few pages so that CrossRef can provide the record data.

== History ==
EndNote Version 1 was released as a ”Reference Database and Bibliography Maker” for Apple Macintosh in c. 1989 by Niles & Associates near Emeryville at a list price of US $129 plus shipping. However, starting with version 2.1. in 1995, EndNote has been available for Windows.

Libraries created with EndNote 7 and earlier are restricted to the size of 32,767 references, or 32 megabytes, whichever comes first. In the early 1990s, software reviewers stated, that “EndNote is a citation manager, not a personal online catalog. Its focus is on inserting citations into written documents,” although it has had the “ability to import formatted references from other databases” from its very early days.

Starting with version 2 in c. 1995, many EndNote users considered the product as “a dual purpose program”, that "functions as a database manager and as a bibliography maker to insert citations into word processing documents and later compiles the bibliography in the required format”. With the release of version 4.0 in c. 2000, EndNote attained most of its current functionality. EndNote's database size limit has been increased several times.

In 2000 EndNote was acquired by Institute for Scientific Information’s (ISI) Research Soft Division, part of Thomson Corporation. In 2016, EndNote was transferred from Thomson Reuters to a spin-off company, Clarivate.

In 1992, there were four other products competing with EndNote: ProCite, Reference Manager, Papyrus and Bibilostax. In 1998–2015 Biblioscape was on this list as well. Zotero was added to this list in 2006 and Mendeley in 2008.

In September 2008, Thomson Reuters, the owners of EndNote, sued the Commonwealth of Virginia for US$10 million and requested an injunction against competing reference management software. George Mason University's Center for History and New Media had developed Zotero, a free/open-source extension to Mozilla Firefox. Thomson Reuters alleges that the Zotero developers reverse engineered and/or decompiled EndNote, that Zotero can transform proprietary EndNote citation style files (.ens) to the open Citation Style Language format, that they host files converted in this manner, and that they abuse the "EndNote" trademark in describing this feature. Thomson Reuters claims that this is violation of the site license agreement. They also added a restrictive click-thru license to their styles download website. George Mason University responded that it would not renew its site license for EndNote, that "anything created by users of Zotero belongs to those users, and that it should be as easy as possible for Zotero users to move to and from the software as they wish, without friction." The journal Nature editorialized that "the virtues of interoperability and easy data-sharing among researchers are worth restating. Imagine if Microsoft Word or Excel files could be opened and saved only in these proprietary formats, for example. It would be impossible for OpenOffice and other such software to read and save these files using open standards — as they can legally do." The case was dismissed on June 4, 2009.

== EndNote Online ==
EndNote Online, a web-based implementation of EndNote, offers integration with the Web of Science.

== Find Full Text ==
A feature to quickly find the full text of up to 250 articles at once.

== See also ==
Data schemes

- BibTeX – a text-based data format used by LaTeX
- refer – a similar, but not identical, data scheme supported on UNIX-like systems
- RIS – a text-based data scheme from Research Information Systems

Software

- Comparison of reference management software – compares EndNote to other similar software
