= Zotero =

Open-source reference management software

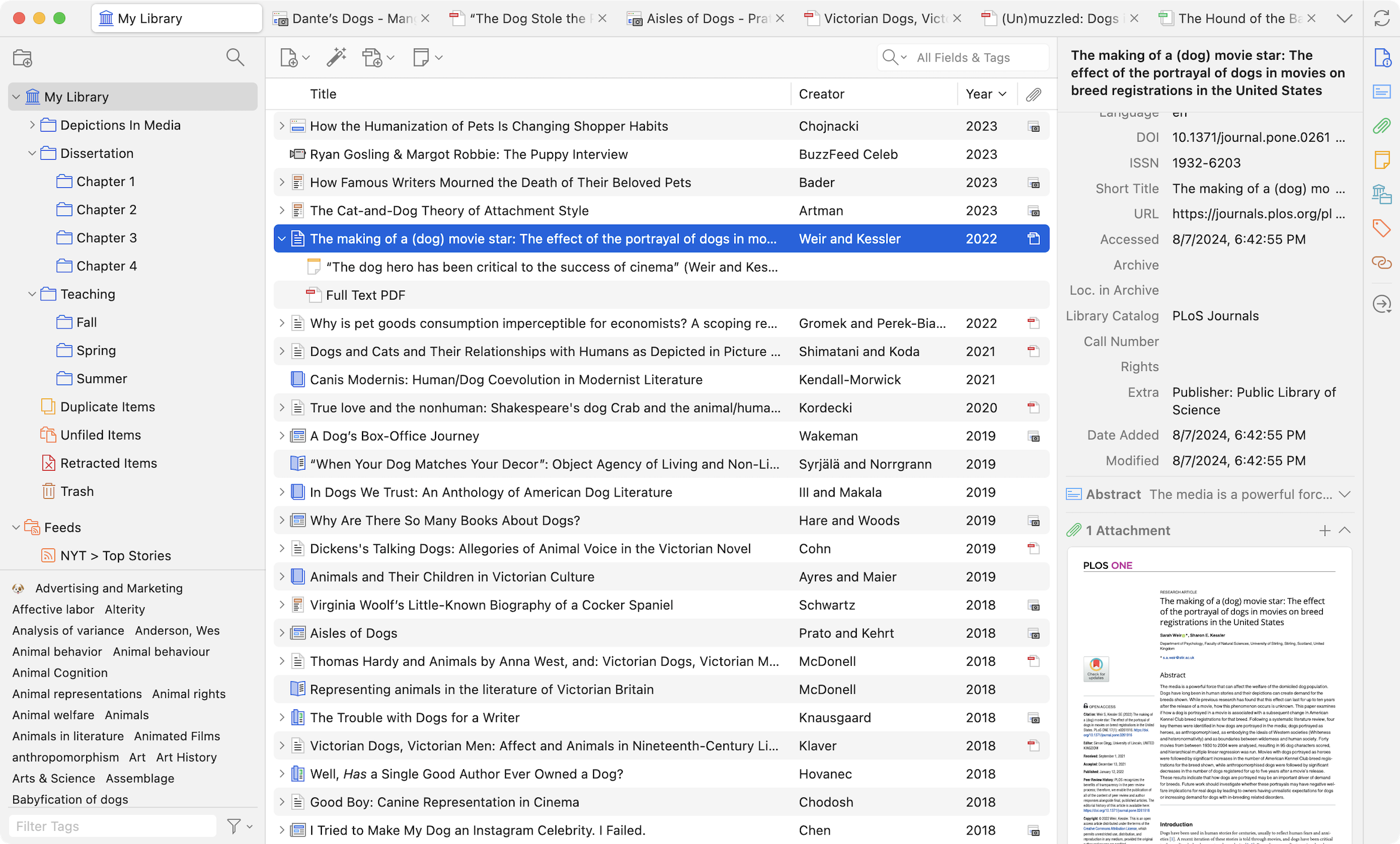
- Zotero 7.0
- Developers: Corporation for Digital Scholarship, previously Center for History and New Media at George Mason University
- Release: October 5, 2006; 20 years ago
- Stable release: 10.0.7 (29 October 2026; 6 days ago) [±]
- Written in: JavaScript with SQLite backend
- Operating system: Windows, macOS, Linux, iOS, iPadOS, Android
- Size: c. 146 MB
- Type: Reference management
- License: AGPL
- Website: zotero.org
- Repository: github.com/zotero/zotero

Zotero (/zoʊˈtɛroʊ/) is free and open-source reference management software to manage bibliographic data and related research materials, such as PDF and ePUB files. Features include web browser integration, online syncing, generation of in-text citations, footnotes, and bibliographies, integrated PDF, ePUB and HTML readers with annotation capabilities, and a note editor, as well as integration with the word processors Microsoft Word, Google Docs, LibreOffice Writer, OnlyOffice, and SoftMaker Office. It was originally created at the Center for History and New Media at George Mason University and, as of 2021, is developed by the non-profit Corporation for Digital Scholarship.

== Features ==
When the Zotero Connector extension is installed in a compatible web browser, a special icon appears in the browser toolbar when a catalog entry or a resource (book, article, thesis) is being viewed on any of a wide variety of websites (such as library catalogues or databases like PubMed, Google Scholar, Google Books, Amazon.com, Wikipedia, and publishers' websites). Clicking this icon saves reference information to the Zotero library. Such functionality is made possible by 'translators' – short pieces of computer code, or scripts to understand the structure of web pages and to parse them into citations using its internal formats. For mobile devices or browsers that do not support the Zotero Connector extension, a bookmarklet was available, but has been discontinued.

Zotero can also save a copy of the webpage, or, in the case of academic articles, a copy of the full text PDF. Users can then add notes, tags, attachments, and their own metadata. Items are organized through a drag-and-drop interface, and can be searched.

Selections of the local reference library data can later be exported as formatted bibliographies. Furthermore, all entries including bibliographic information and user-created rich-text memos of the selected articles can be summarized into an HTML report.

Zotero users can generate citations and bibliographies through word processor plugins, or directly in Zotero, using Citation Style Language styles. The house styles of most academic journals are available in Zotero, and the bibliography can be reformatted with a few clicks. Zotero also allows users to create their own customised citation styles.

Zotero can import and export citations from or to many formats, including Wikipedia Citation Templates, BibTeX, BibLateX, RefWorks, MODS, COinS, Citation Style Language/JSON, refer/BibIX, RIS, TEI, several flavours of RDF, Evernote, and EndNote.

Zotero can associate notes with bibliographic items. It can annotate PDFs and synchronise them across desktop, iOS and Android apps.

As of 2022, Zotero supports more than forty languages (some of them not completely translated).

Zotero has no institutional customer support service, but the Zotero website provides extensive information, including instructional screencasts, troubleshooting tips, a list of known issues, and user forums. Questions and issues raised in the forums are answered quickly, with users and developers suggesting solutions. Many academic institutions provide Zotero tutorials to their members.

Most citation style and translator codes are written by volunteers from the community and, as open-source scripts, may be used by third-party tools as well, for example Wikipedia's Citoid citation generator.

== Extensions, plugins, related applications ==
=== Extensions ===
==== Cita ====
When using the Cita plugin, first released in 2021, Zotero supports automated retrieval and sharing of citation network data from and to external sources, and local citation network visualization. This further integrates Zotero to the Initiative for Open Citations ecosystem, including OpenCitations and Wikidata.

==== ZotFile ====
PDFs (or other files) can be synchronized from Zotero to other mobile apps through the ZotFile plugin.

=== Juris-M ===
Juris-M is a fork of Zotero with additional features supporting legal research and multilingual citations. It allows for multilingual citations, and translations and transliterations of citation fields and provides additional support for needs of scholars in fields of law. It was created by Frank Bennett, an associate professor of comparative law at Nagoya University, who continues to maintain it. Amongst the legal citation styles supported are the American Bluebook style, the UK OSCOLA style, and the Canadian McGill style. Many other European and Commonwealth jurisdictions are also supported.

=== Mobile apps ===
Zotero mobile apps are available for iOS (iPad and iPhone) and Android. Several apps not developed by Zotero for Android tablets and phones are available as well. The iOS app is developed by the creators of the Zotero desktop app and was released in March 2022. A stable version of Zotero's own Android app by Zotero was released in June 2025.

=== Web library ===
Synchronizing a library to zotero.org allows users to access and edit the library in the "web library" interface from any current web browser, including the mobile version of the website on a tablet or mobile phone. Users can save new references to the web library using its "magic wand" button.

=== ZoteroBib ===
In May 2018, Zotero's creators launched the web-based bibliography tool ZoteroBib (zbib.org), where users can generate bibliographies on the web without installing Zotero or creating a Zotero account.

== Financial support and awards ==
Development of Zotero has been funded by the Andrew W. Mellon Foundation, the Alfred P. Sloan Foundation, and the Institute of Museum and Library Services, as well as user donations. The storage subscriptions of individuals and institutions, which allow cloud syncing of attached files in users' libraries, fund Zotero's development and services.

Zotero has won awards from PC Magazine, Northwestern University's CiteFest competition, and the American Political Science Association.

== History ==
The name "Zotero" is loosely derived from the Albanian verb zotëroj, meaning 'to master'.

The first release of Zotero, 1.0.0b2.r1, was made available in October 2006 as an add-on for the Firefox web browser. Development of Zotero 1.0.x continued until May 2009, when Zotero 1.0.10 was released.

In 2008, Thomson Reuters sued the Commonwealth of Virginia and George Mason University, based on the claim that Zotero's developers had, in violation of the EndNote EULA, reverse-engineered EndNote and provided Zotero with the ability to convert EndNote's proprietary .ens styles into Citation Style Language (CSL) styles. George Mason University responded that they would not renew their site license for EndNote and that "anything created by users of Zotero belongs to those users, and that it should be as easy as possible for Zotero users to move to and from the software as they wish, without friction". The journal Nature editorialized that "the virtues of interoperability and easy data sharing among researchers are worth restating. Imagine if Microsoft Word or Excel files could be opened and saved only in these proprietary formats, for example. It would be impossible for OpenOffice and other such software to read and save these files using open standards—as they can legally do."

The case was dismissed on June 4, 2009, due to a lack of jurisdiction. Although the Virginia Supreme Court granted an appeal to Thomson Reuters in this case on December 18, 2009, the appeal was withdrawn on January 11, 2011.

Zotero 2.0, released in February 2010, added online features such as metadata and file syncing and group libraries, and included a license change from the Educational Community License to GPLv3. Development of Zotero 2.0.x continued until October 2010, when Zotero 2.0.9 was released.

Zotero 2.1, released in March 2011, adds CSL 1.0 support, Firefox 4 compatibility (the minimum is Firefox 3.6), and Zotero Commons, through which materials can be uploaded to the Internet Archive.

Zotero Standalone, first released in January 2011, allowed Zotero to be run as an independent program outside Firefox. Using XULRunner, Zotero Standalone was made available for Windows, Linux, and macOS. Browser connectors were available to use Zotero Standalone with the web browsers Safari and Chrome.

Zotero 3.0, released in January 2012, includes the stable release of Zotero Standalone as well as several new major features, including overhauled Word and LibreOffice (Note: which includes OpenOffice.org) integration and duplicate detection. Version 3.0 also introduced the Zotero bookmarklet for iOS (Note: iPad, iPhone) browsers, Android browser, Chrome for Android, Firefox mobile, and Opera mobile allowing uses to save reference data to their Zotero library when using mobile devices.

Zotero 4.0, released in April 2013, includes new features such as automatic journal abbreviations, direct downloading of PDFs to Zotero Standalone from the Zotero Firefox plugin, a single save button on the Zotero browser plugin (which combines the functionality of the address bar icon and the "Create Web Page Item from Current Page" button), colored tags, and on-demand file syncing.

Zotero 5.0, released in July 2017, did away with the Firefox plugin, replacing it with a Firefox connector for the new standalone product, which was now simply branded as the Zotero app. This move was the result of Mozilla discontinuing its extension framework on which Zotero for Firefox was based. The Zotero Connectors for Chrome and Safari were also revamped, and given additional features. A point update also introduced a new PDF recognizer, using a Zotero-designed web service that doesn't rely on Google Scholar, to retrieve metadata for PDF files.

In October 2018, automatic PDF file retrieval, until then limited to directly saving from original web sources, was expanded to include open-access PDF files available at Unpaywall, and integration with word processors was extended to include Google Docs through the Firefox and Chrome connectors. In June 2019, as the result of a collaboration with Retraction Watch, Zotero started flagging retracted publications in its app, and warns users who try to cite retracted articles.

In March 2022, with the release of version 6.0, Zotero added an integrated PDF viewer and annotation functionality, in addition to a new note editor. An iOS app was also released.

In May 2023, the Zotero 7 beta was officially announced. Zotero 7 features a significant upgrade to the Mozilla Firefox-based architecture, alongside a major rewrite of its source code. The upgrade of Zotero also improved performance and compatibility with different operating systems, including native support for Apple Silicon Macs. A 64-bit Windows build also allows for a better handling of large libraries and PDF files.

In August 2023, EPUB and HTML readers with annotation tools were added to the desktop app in the Zotero 7 beta.

In December 2023, a beta version of the Android app was released.

In January 2024, a major redesign of the graphical user interface of Zotero was announced and directly made accessible to developers and beta testers along with the last version of Zotero 7 beta. The new design exhibits a more ergonomic and modern look while still remaining familiar to the long-time Zotero users. It was also accompanied by a refreshed version of the Zotero logo.

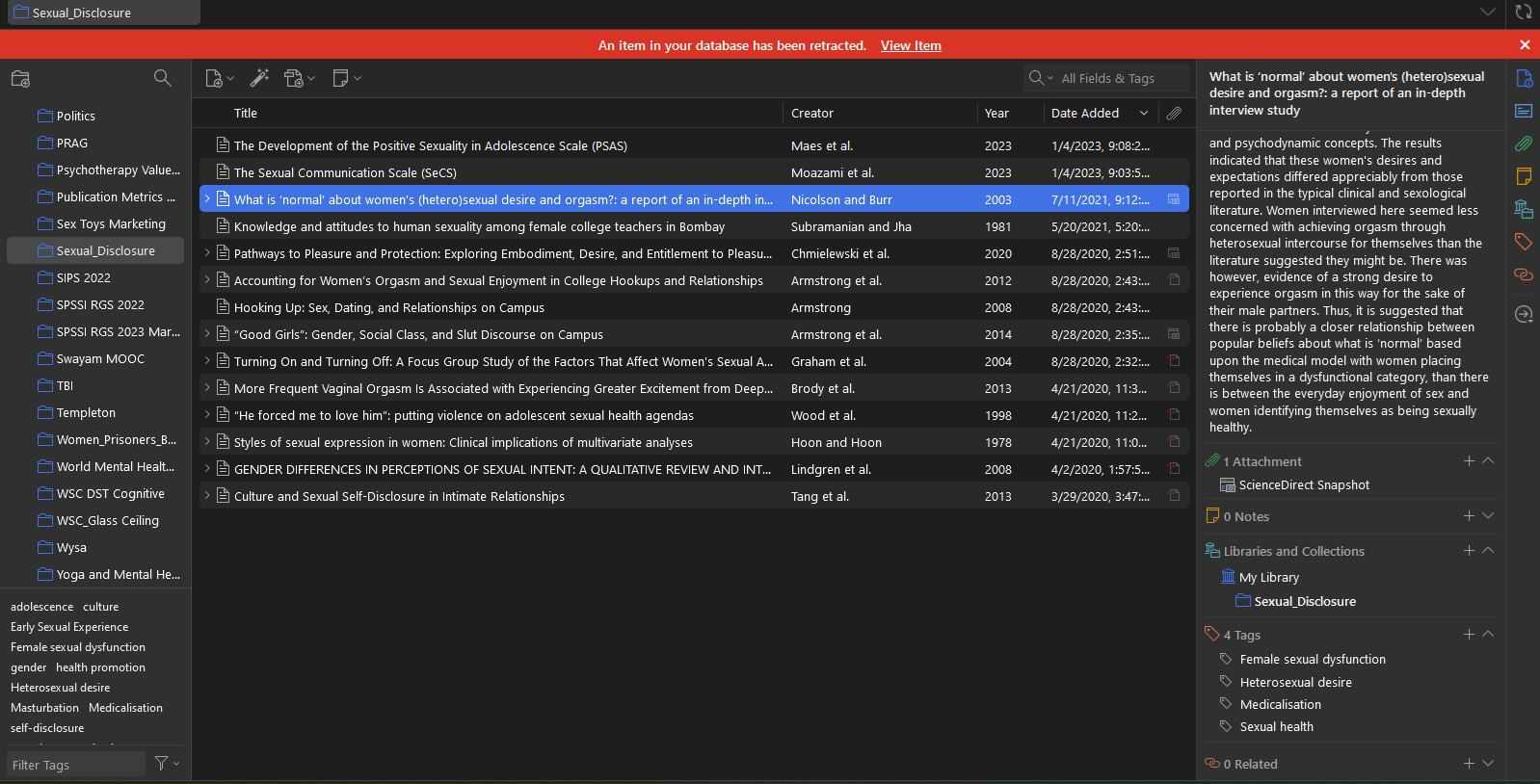
Zotero 7 dark mode screenshot

Zotero 7.0 was officially released as stable version on 9 August 2024. It provides native support for Apple Silicon Macs, Linux, support for 64-bit Windows, and Windows on ARM. A Zotero app for iOS and iPadOS is available, and a stable version for Android was released on 5 June 2025. Version 7 includes a new reader for EPUBs and HTML snapshots, as well as PDFs. The major app redesign comprises new annotations capabilities, a dark mode, a redesigned item pane with collapsible vertical sections and side navigation bar, and two viewing density options, compact and comfortable, along with the new app icon. All existing plug-ins need to be updated for the new version 7, but part of their functionalities has been incorporated in Zotero 7.0.

== See also ==
- Comparison of reference management software
- Citation Style Language (CSL)
- CiteProc
- JabRef
- LibX
- ScrapBook – A Firefox extension having similar capture features, but no bibliographic functions
- unAPI
- Mendeley – proprietary equivalent software tool
