= BibSonomy =

Social bookmarking and publication-sharing system

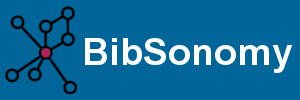

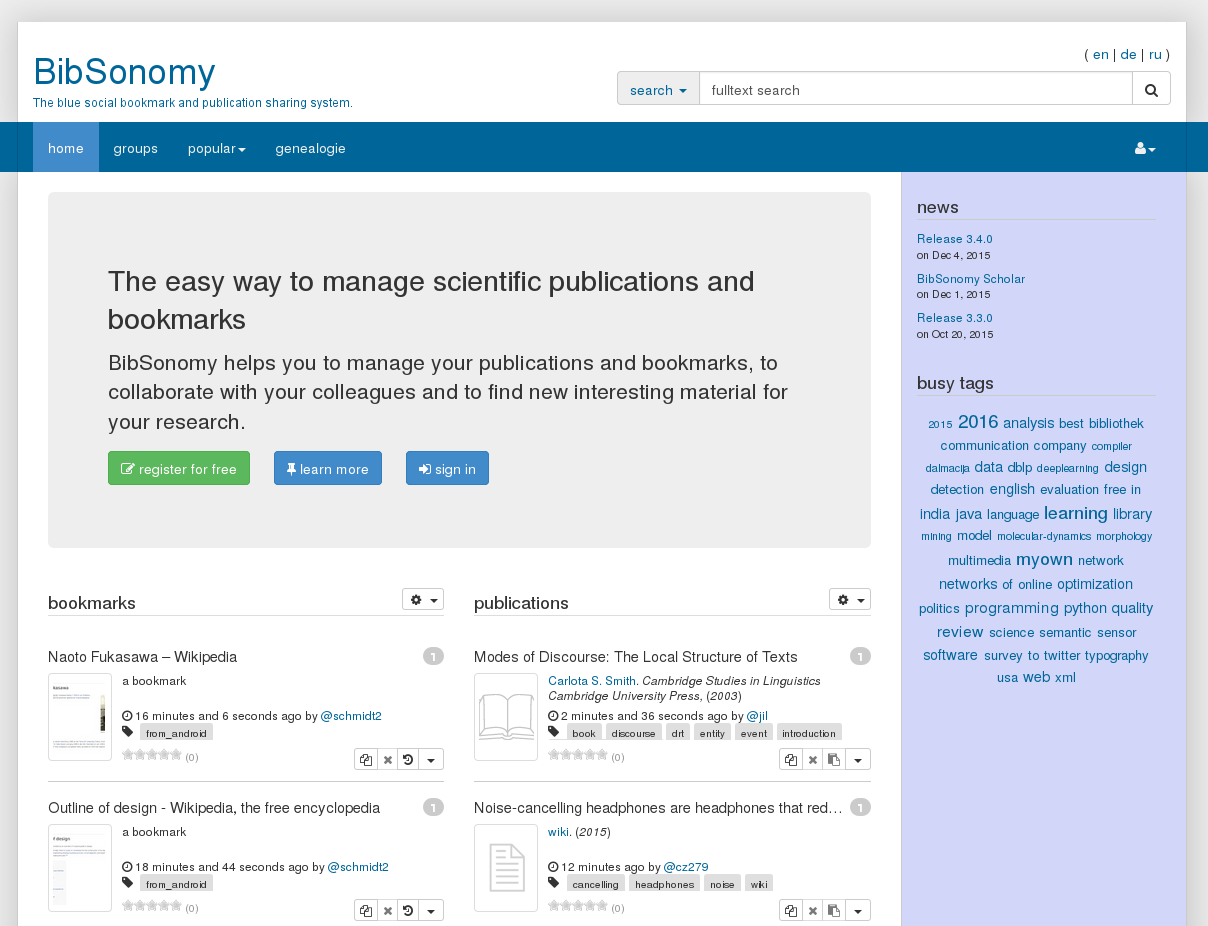
- The BibSonomy homepage
- Website type: Online social bookmarking
- Owners: University of Kassel, University of Würzburg, Leibniz University Hannover
- Website: bibsonomy.org
- Commercial: No
- Registration: Optional
- Launched: January 2006
- Current status: Active
- Written in: Java

BibSonomy is a social bookmarking and publication-sharing system. It aims to integrate the features of bookmarking systems as well as team-oriented publication management. BibSonomy offers users the ability to store and organize their bookmarks and publication entries and supports the integration of different communities and people by offering a social platform for literature exchange.

Both bookmarks and publication entries can be tagged to help structure and re-find information. As the descriptive terms can be freely chosen, the assignment of tags from different users creates a spontaneous, uncontrolled vocabulary: a folksonomy. In BibSonomy, the folksonomy evolves from the participation of research groups, learning communities and individual users, organizing their information needs.

Publication posts in BibSonomy are stored in the BibTeX format. Export in other formats such as EndNote or HTML (e. g. for publication list creation) is possible.

The service was developed by a team of students and scientists from the Institute of Knowledge and Data Engineering, the DMIR group at the University of Würzburg and the L3S Learning Lab Lower Saxony in Hannover and is mainly hosted by the University of Kassel. As of 17 November 2008, the source code of BibSonomy is available under the GNU Lesser General Public License. As of 12 March 2014, the source code of the BibSonomy web application is available under the GNU Affero General Public License.
