= Citation Style Language =

Open XML-based language

The Citation Style Language (CSL) is an open XML file format that describes schema for the formatting of citations and bibliographies. Reference management programs using CSL include Zotero, Mendeley and Papers. The Pandoc lightweight document conversion system also supports citations in CSL, YAML, and JSON formats and can render these using any of the CSL styles listed in the Zotero Style Repository.

== History ==
CSL was created by Bruce D'Arcus for use with OpenOffice.org, and an XSLT-based "CiteProc" CSL processor. CSL was further developed in collaboration with Zotero developer Simon Kornblith. Since 2008, the core development team consists of D'Arcus, Frank Bennett, Rintze Zelle, Brenton Wiernik and Denis Maier.

The releases of CSL are 0.8 (March 21, 2009), 0.8.1 (February 1, 2010), 1.0 (March 22, 2010), 1.0.1 (September 3, 2012), and 1.0.2 (October 22, 2021). CSL 1.0 was a backward-incompatible release, but styles in the 0.8.1 format can be automatically updated to the CSL 1.0 format.

On its release in 2006, Zotero became the first application to adopt CSL. In 2008 Mendeley was released with CSL support, and in 2011, Papers and Qiqqa gained support for CSL-based citation formatting.

== Software support ==
- Zotero, Mendeley, Papers, and Qiqqa all support CSL 1.0 (Zotero also supports CSL 0.8.1 styles, which are internally updated to CSL 1.0).
- Zotero, Mendeley, and Qiqqa rely on the citeproc-js JavaScript CSL processor.
- Zotero, Mendeley, and Qiqqa provide a built-in CSL editor to help create and modify CSL styles.
- typst supports CSL, via the hayagriva citation system.
- LaTeX can support CSL, by using the citeproc-lua package.

== Styles ==
The CSL project maintains a CSL 1.0 style repository, which contains over 9000 styles (more than 1700 unique styles).
