= Mendeley =

Reference management software

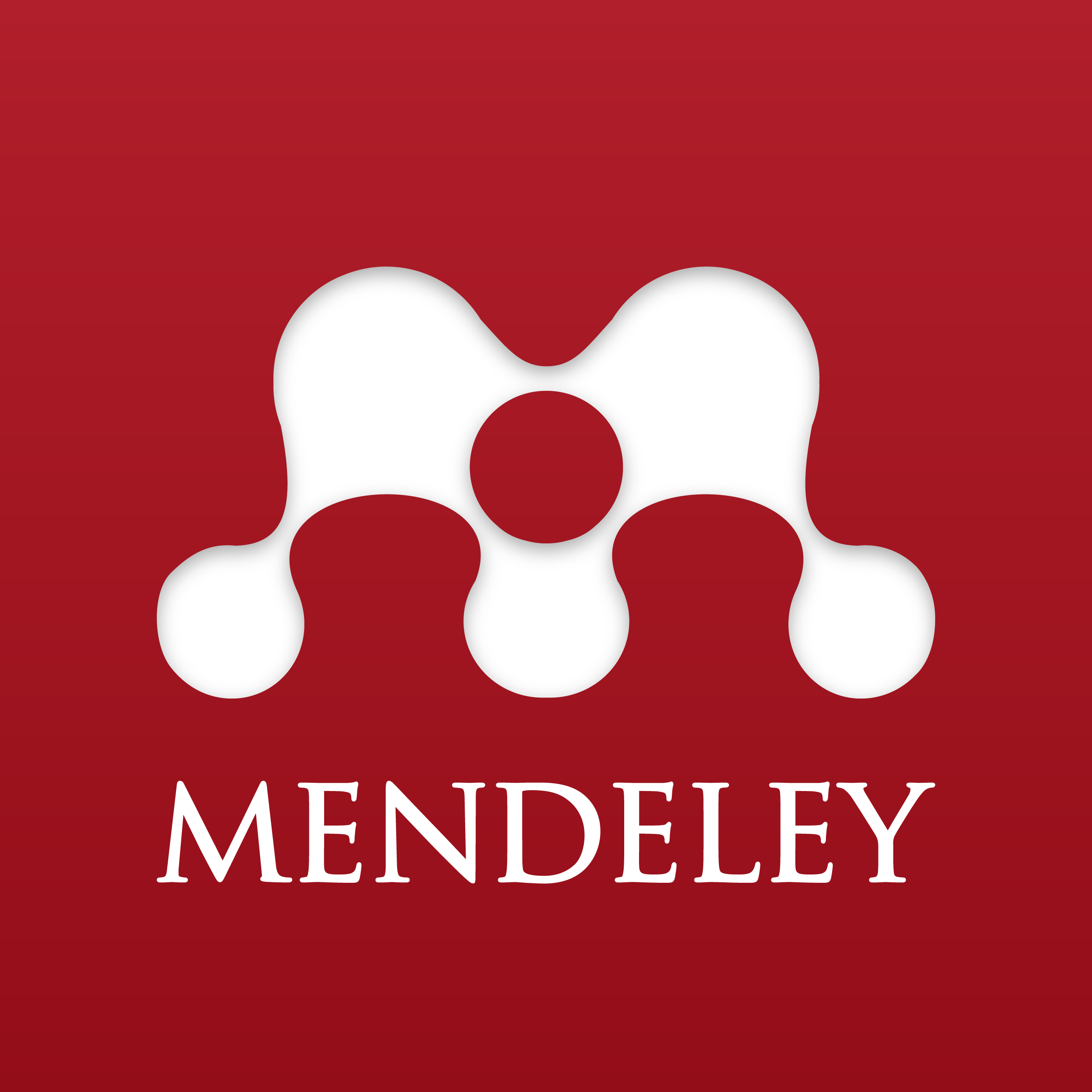

- Mendeley Desktop (previous Mendeley main application)
- Original authors: Paul Foeckler, Victor Henning, Jan Reichelt
- Developer: Elsevier
- Release: August 2008; 18 years ago
- Stable release: 2.144.0 / 23 March 2026
- Operating system: Windows, macOS, Linux
- Available in: English
- Type: Reference management software
- License: Proprietary
- Website: mendeley.com

Mendeley is a reference manager software founded in 2007 by PhD students Paul Foeckler, Victor Henning, Jan Reichelt and acquired by the Dutch academic publishing company Elsevier in 2013. It is used to manage and share research papers and to generate bibliographies for scholarly articles.

== History ==
The company Mendeley, named after the Austrian biologist Gregor Mendel and the Russian chemist Dmitri Mendeleev, was founded in London in November 2007 by three German PhD students. The first public beta version of the software was released in August 2008. The company's investors included some people previously involved with Last.fm, Skype, and Warner Music Group, as well as academicians from Cambridge and Johns Hopkins University.

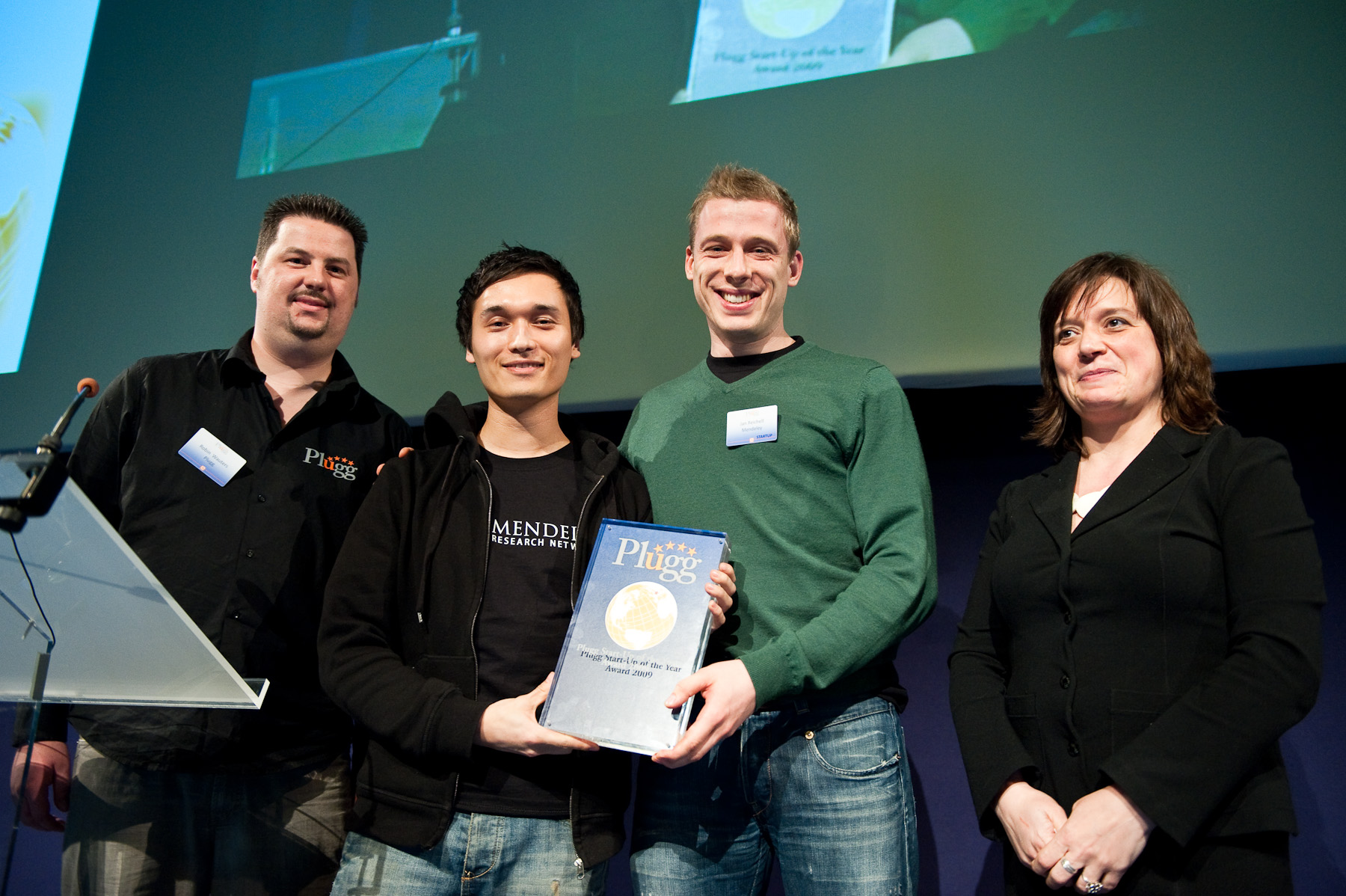
Victor Henning and Jan Reichelt receiving the Plugg "European Start-up of the Year" award, 2009

In 2009, Mendeley won several awards including Plugg.eu "European Start-up of the Year 2009", TechCrunch Europas "Best Social Innovation Which Benefits Society 2009", and The Guardian ranked it #6 in "Top 100 tech media companies".

In 2012, Mendeley was one of the repositories for green Open Access recommended by the American philosopher Peter Suber, a leading voice in the open access movement. This recommendation was revoked after Elsevier bought and licensed it as a proprietary software.

Mendeley was purchased by the academic publisher Elsevier in early 2013. The deal price was speculated to be €50 million (US$65 million). The sale led to debate on scientific networks and in the media interested in Open Access, and upset members of the scientific community who felt that the Mendeley's acquisition by Elsevier was antithetical to Mendeley's open sharing model.

David Dobbs, in The New Yorker, suggested Elsevier's reasons for buying Mendeley could have been to acquire its user data and/or to "destroy or co opt an open-science icon that threatens its business model." This was contrasted to a non-profit service like Unpaywall, which marketed itself as not susceptible to a sell-out to Elsevier.

== Products evolution ==
After the acquisition, the Mendeley team extended its product line while continuing to iterate on its core reference manager application (Mendeley Desktop).

On 23 September 2013, Mendeley announced iPhone and iPad apps. An Android app followed shortly after.

On 12 January 2015, Mendeley announced the acquisition of Newsflo, a service which provided links to press coverage of researchers' work. The functionality was subsequently incorporated into Mendeley Feed and Mendeley Profile.

In April 2016, Mendeley Data, a platform for sharing citable research datasets online, was promoted out of beta.

In October 2016, Mendeley Careers was launched. The service is intended to help researchers locate job opportunities.

On 24 May 2019, Elsevier announced two new products: Mendeley Reference Manager and Mendeley Cite.

On 15 March 2021, the Mendeley mobile app was removed from the Apple App Store and Google Play, leaving the only way to access the services via the web site, or using Mendeley Reference Manager (desktop app). The literature search function in the desktop application had also been removed.

In September 2022, Elsevier discontinued the downloads of the legacy "Mendeley Desktop" application as part of a transition to the new web-based solution (still accessible from the desktop with the more recent "Mendeley Reference Manager"). In 2024, the company had planned to permanently stop the signs-in to "Mendeley Desktop" but based on customer feedback reversed course in July 2025 and announced that they would maintain Mendeley Desktop and continue to provide essential support.

== Mendeley components ==
Mendeley is based on a web service requiring to first create a personal account on the Mendeley site. On the local computer side, it works in conjunction with a word processor plug-in, or add-in (mandatory), and a desktop application (now facultative for the latest current version).

The new "Mendeley Reference Manager library" is cloud-based. On 7 September 2020, it replaced the former "Mendeley Web Library". This guarantees that the latest changes are always saved in the cloud and that references are accessible on several devices.

The table here below provides an overview of the different Mendeley components and allows to compare the discontinued and the current applications. While the deprecated "Mendeley Desktop" is still active, it needs to be used in conjunction with the legacy "Cite-O-Matic" Word plug-in. The new "Mendeley Reference Manager" works with the "Mendeley Cite" Word add-in. The "Mendeley Cite" Word add-in being a stand alone plug-in, it can also be directly used with Word without requiring "Mendeley Reference Manager" (desktop app) to be open, or even installed.

Overview of the Mendeley software components (discontinued and currently developed) and their compatibility
Function of the Mendeley component	Discontinued	Currently developed
Mendeley Web account always required	"Mendeley Web Library"	"Mendeley Reference Manager" (web)
Desktop application (allowing to work off-line)	"Mendeley Desktop"	"Mendeley Reference Manager" (desktop)
Citation Word^{*} plug-in/add-in	"Cite-O-Matic" Word^{*} plug-in	"Mendeley Cite" Word^{*} add-in (stand alone app)
Add-on to web browser to discover references	Mendeley Web Importer for Chrome and Firefox (current)	
Compatibility with Windows	For Windows 7+	For Windows 7+
Compatibility with macOS	For macOS versions older than 10.15 (Catalina, already incompatible)	From macOS 10.10 (Yosemite) and more recent
Note: Microsoft Word^{*}, or other word processors supported by Mendeley such as LibreOffice.

Mendeley requires first to create a free account on its web site. Institutional, or premium, accounts also exist providing extra storage space to their users (academics, universities, research organisms, subscribing companies...). Free accounts can be upgraded to institutional accounts provided the user logs in with their institutional email address. If preferred, after the add-in "Mendeley Cite" has first been installed in the word processor, Mendeley can also be used entirely online, without downloading the "Mendeley Reference Manager" desktop app. Then, the library of references is simply accessed by logging into the Mendeley account with a web browser.

The new citation Word add-in "Mendeley Cite" is a standalone application, which means that it can be used without having to open, or even to install, "Mendeley Reference Manager", as well as being used with online versions of Word (for Windows or macOS). This points out to the predominant importance of the cloud-based database which should always be considered by the user as the "master" prevalent reference database in order to anticipate known and potential issues when switching back from off-line to on-line, after a period of disconnection with the desktop application.

Both the legacy and the new desktop applications allow to work off-line when no web connection is available, and also offer extra features. To properly function, they need to be regularly synchronised (synced) on-line with the "master" database stored in the cloud, and some operations with the desktop app, such as importing references from text files (.ris, .bibtex, xml...) require to be connected on-line to avoid issues. Both desktop applications support various additional functionalities such as multiple PDFs local annotations, and ideas organisation, using the Mendeley Notebook. Only the desktop apps (Windows, macOS, and Linux) allow to export all the references in one shot as a text file.

== Limitations and known issues ==
Not all the features available in the legacy "Mendeley Desktop" application have been yet implemented in the new "Mendeley Reference Manager" desktop application and it is unclear if they will be, because the "master" reference database of Mendeley is the on-line database available in the cloud, not the local database (a copy of the master) temporarily stored on the personal computer for working off-line. To avoid problems while being off-line with the recent "Mendeley Reference Manager" desktop version, new references directly imported from text files (.ris, .bibtex, .xml...) must always first be added to the "master" web database when being connected on-line. When being off-line, only small changes manually applied to the local database by using the keyboard (i.e., typos corrections, or hand-typed references) are properly synced with the "master" web database.

It is not possible to export as a text file (.ris, .bibtex, .xml...) all the references stored in a library in one shot with "Mendeley Reference Manager web". The complete set of all the references can only be exported from the "Mendeley Reference Manager" desktop app (preferably when being connected on-line). However, the web version allows to export selected references or collections.

Mendeley lacks a function to control the capitalisation of words in the reference title, so that the list of references generated in a document may contain a mix of titles presented in different letter case formats such as "Sentence case" or "Title Case".

The "Mendeley Reference Manager" desktop app works fine with macOS recent versions (Ventura, Sonoma), but as it is not yet optimized for the new mac family equipped with the Apple silicon M-series SoC processors, it requires the automatic installation of Rosetta 2 to run. Rosetta 2 is a dynamic binary translator which converts on the fly the instructions written for the Intel x86-64 processor family to the SoC (System on a Chip) of the new Apple M-series. Rosetta 2 silently works in the background, and as it does not require any interaction from the user, has even no graphical user interface. After the automatic installation of Rosetta 2, the correct handling of the Apple Disk Image (.dmg file) containing the drag and drop installer can be confusing, and quite disturbing, for the user unfamiliar with this kind of installer, if he does not immediately realise that he has to drag and drop the app icon (left) onto the shortcut of the Applications folder (right) to correctly copy the Mendeley desktop program at the right place on the Mac. After opening the disk image containing the installer, simply doubly clicking on the "Mendeley Reference Manager" desktop app icon only launches the desktop program and initiates the online registration procedure without copying the program into the Mac Applications folder as anticipated. However, a further drag and drop operation is sufficient to complete the installation without problem.

== Features ==
The software can track reader counts, a readership statistic which has been asserted to predict citation impact, whereas journal-level metrics are poor predictors of reliability. An automatic metadata extraction from PDF files is also available. The platform can integrate with Microsoft Word, OpenOffice and other platforms. The platform intends to be copyright-compliant by allowing users to share files in private groups.

== Incidents ==
In 2018, an update to Mendeley resulted in some users losing PDFs and annotations stored in their accounts. Elsevier fixed the issue for most users after a number of weeks.

== See also ==
- Comparison of reference management software
- Metadata discovery
- Citation Style Language
- List of academic databases and search engines
- Zotero – open access equivalent software tool
