= IEEE Xplore =

Research database focused on computer science and related fields

- Producer: Institute of Electrical and Electronics Engineers and Institution of Engineering and Technology
- History: May 2000; 26 years ago
- Languages: English

Access
- Providers: IEEE Xplore
- Cost: Subscription

Coverage
- Disciplines: Computer science, electrical engineering and electronics
- Record depth: Index, abstracts, full-text
- Format coverage: Journals, magazines, ebooks, conference proceedings, standards, courses
- Geospatial coverage: Worldwide
- No. of records: 5,360,654 (December 2020)
- Update frequency: Daily; approximately 20,000 new documents are added each month

Links
- Website: ieeexplore.ieee.org

IEEE Xplore (stylized as IEEE Xplore) digital library, is a research database for discovery and access to journal articles, conference proceedings, technical standards, and related materials on computer science, electrical engineering and electronics, and allied fields. It contains material published mainly by the Institute of Electrical and Electronics Engineers (IEEE) and other partner publishers. IEEE Xplore provides web access to more than 5 million documents from publications in computer science, electrical engineering, electronics and allied fields. Its documents and other materials comprise more than 300 peer-reviewed journals, more than 1,900 global conferences, more than 11,000 technical standards, almost 5,000 ebooks, and over 500 online courses. Approximately 20,000 new documents are added each month. Anyone can search IEEE Xplore and find bibliographic records and abstracts for its contents, while access to full-text documents may require an individual or institutional subscription.

== See also ==
- ACM Digital Library
- IEEE Computer Society Digital Library
- List of academic databases and search engines
