= Metadata Object Description Schema =

File standard used by the United States Congress Library

- MODS Logo
- Abbreviation: MODS
- Status: Published
- Year started: 2002
- Latest version: 3.8; September 2022
- Related standards: MARC
- Domain: Bibliography
- Website: www.loc.gov/standards/mods

The Metadata Object Description Schema (MODS) is an XML-based bibliographic description schema developed by the United States Library of Congress' Network Development and Standards Office. MODS was designed as a compromise between the complexity of the MARC format used by libraries and the extreme simplicity of Dublin Core metadata.

== About MODS ==
=== History and development ===
The Library of Congress' Network Development and MARC Standards Office, with interested experts, developed the Metadata Object Description Schema (MODS) in 2002 for a bibliographic element set that may be used for a variety of purposes, and particularly for library applications. As an XML schema it is intended to be able to carry selected data from existing MARC 21 records as well as to enable the creation of original resource description records. It includes a subset of MARC fields and uses language-based tags rather than numeric ones, in some cases regrouping elements from the MARC 21 bibliographic format. MODS was first announced for trial use in June 2002. Since September 16, 2022 it is at version 3.8.

The number of users of MODS is unknown. Implementers are encouraged to register their uses of MODS in the implementation registry on the official MODS website. To date there are about 35 projects listed in the registry, although it is assumed that many others are making use of the standard. Users are primarily operating in the area of digital libraries, and some of the registered uses are in digital library projects at the Library of Congress.

=== Relationship to MARC ===
The MODS record has been designed to carry key data elements from the MARC record but does not define all of the MARC fields and does not use the field and subfield tagging from the MARC standard. There are data elements in MODS that are not compatible with the MARC record so there is some loss translating from MARC to MODS and from MODS to MARC. There is no commitment on the part of the Library of Congress to maintain compatibility between the two metadata formats beyond what is convenient to the community of MODS users.

The Library of Congress maintains crosswalks in XSLT format for mapping from MARC to MODS, and from MODS to MARC.

=== Relationship to Dublin Core and qualified Dublin Core ===
Dublin Core is a simple schema. MODS is far more complex.

The Library of Congress maintains crosswalks in XSLT format for mapping from Dublin Core to MODS, and from MODS to Dublin Core. However, no crosswalks are available for mapping between qualified Dublin Core and MODS.

=== Advantages ===
The use of MODS provides several advantages compared to other metadata schemas:

- High compatibility with existing resource descriptions
- Less detail than MARC so various internal record element sets can be mapped to MODS
- Item descriptions from outside in DC and other simpler formats can be mapped and enhanced

=== Maintenance board ===
Revisions to the schema are suggested and discussed on the MODS listserv, and approved by the MODS Editorial Committee. The MODS/MADS Editorial Committee is an international group of volunteers responsible for maintaining editorial control over MODS and MADS and their accompanying documentation as well as for the MODS and MADS XML schemas. The Library of Congress carries out the application of approved changes to the schema and maintains the official web site for the standard. There is no formal standards body involved in the MODS schema at this time.

== See also ==
- Comparison of reference management software for software supporting the MODS format
- Metadata Authority Description Schema (MADS) created to serve as a companion to the Metadata Object Description Schema (MODS). MADS describes authorities (as in authority control), meaning people, organizations, geographical location etc. involved in creating, publishing, or contributing to creative works and publications. MODS describes individual items.
- Metadata standards
