= ScienceDirect =

Website for accessing scientific and medical publications

- Producer: Elsevier
- History: March 12, 1997; 29 years ago

Access
- Cost: Subscription and open access

Coverage
- Disciplines: Science
- Record depth: Index, abstract & full-text
- Format coverage: Books, journals
- Geospatial coverage: Worldwide

Links
- Website: sciencedirect.com

ScienceDirect is a searchable web-based bibliographic database, which provides access to full texts of scientific and medical publications of the Dutch publisher Elsevier as well of several small academic publishers. It hosts over 18 million publications from more than 4,000 academic journals and 30,000 e-books. Access to full-texts requires a subscription, while the bibliographic metadata is publicly available. ScienceDirect was launched by Elsevier in March 1997.

== Usage ==
The journals are grouped into four main sections:

- Physical Sciences and Engineering
- Life Sciences
- Health Sciences
- Social Sciences and Humanities.

Article abstracts are publicly available, and access to their full texts (in PDF and, for newer publications, also HTML) generally requires a subscription or pay-per-view purchase unless the article is publicly available in open access.

Papers published under several open access licenses are available on ScienceDirect without cost. Access to the full-text pdfs of non-open access publications require either a subscription (to the specific journal rather than to the whole database) or per-article/book payment. Subscriptions to the overall texts hosted on ScienceDirect, rather than to specific titles, are usually acquired through what is called a big deal. The other big five publishers have similar offers.

ScienceDirect also competes for audience with other large aggregators and hosts of scholarly communication content such as academic social network ResearchGate and open access repository arXiv, as well as with fully open access publishing venues and mega journals like PLOS.

The search and bibliographic export options of ScienceDirect are very limited. For better search capabilities Elsevier provides via internet a paid-access database Scopus.

== See also ==
- List of academic databases and search engines
- Scopus
