= RIS (file format) =

Standardized tag format for references exchange

- Filename extension: .ris
- Internet media type: application/x-research-info-systems
- Type of format: Bibliography

RIS is a standardized tag format developed by Research Information Systems, Incorporated (the format name refers to the company) to enable citation programs to exchange data. It is supported by a number of reference managers. Many digital libraries, like Web of Science, IEEE Xplore, Scopus, the ACM Portal, Scopemed, ScienceDirect, SpringerLink, Rayyan, The Lens, Accordance Bible Software, and online library catalogs can export citations in this format. Citation management applications can export and import citations in this format.

== Format ==
The RIS file format—two letters, two spaces and a hyphen—is a tagged format for expressing bibliographic citations. According to the specifications, the lines must end with the ASCII carriage return and line feed characters. Note that this is the convention on Microsoft Windows, while in other contemporary operating systems, particularly Unix, the end of line is typically marked by line feed only.

Multiple citation records can be present in a single RIS file. A record ends with an "end record" tag ER - with no additional blank lines between records.

=== Example record ===
This is an example of how the article "Claude E. Shannon. A mathematical theory of communication. Bell System Technical Journal, 27:379–423, July 1948" would be expressed in the RIS file format:

TY  - JOUR
AU  - Shannon, Claude E.
PY  - 1948
DA  - July
TI  - A Mathematical Theory of Communication
T2  - Bell System Technical Journal
SP  - 379
EP  - 423
VL  - 27
ER  - 

=== Example multi-record format ===
This is an example of how two citation records would be expressed in a single RIS file. Note the first record ends with ER - and the second record begins with TY - JOUR:

TY  - JOUR
AU  - Shannon, Claude E.
PY  - 1948
DA  - July
TI  - A Mathematical Theory of Communication
T2  - Bell System Technical Journal
SP  - 379
EP  - 423
VL  - 27
ER  - 
TY  - JOUR
T1  - On computable numbers, with an application to the Entscheidungsproblem
A1  - Turing, Alan Mathison
JO  - Proc. of London Mathematical Society
VL  - 47
IS  - 1
SP  - 230
EP  - 265
Y1  - 1937
ER  - 

== Tags ==
The TY - tag must appear first and the ER - tag must appear last. Most tags must appear at most once, but the author, keyword, and URL tags can be repeated.

Each name must be formatted as a comma-separated list of last name, first name (including middle names, can be initials), and suffix, in that order, and must not be longer than 255 characters. Unless otherwise specified, each date must be formatted as a slash-separated list of 4-digit year, 2-digit month, 2-digit day, and other info (e.g. season); unused fields may be omitted if they are at the end.

Many strings have limits on what characters they can contain (e.g. any ASCII character, just alphanumerics, or just digits) or their length (often limited to 255 characters). These are only sometimes noted in the table below; see the linked sources to double-check, particularly and the pages in RIS Format Specifications.

There are two major versions of the RIS specification, one from 2001, and one from the end of 2011 with different lists of tags for each type of record, sometimes with different meanings. Below is an excerpt of the main RIS tags, from both versions. Except for TY - and ER -, order of tags is free and their inclusion is optional.

Tag	Meaning (see linked references for more details, such as which types have which interpretations)
A1	Interviewee. (Primary) author. Synonym of AU.
A2	Secondary author/editor/translator, e.g. editor, performers, sponsor, series editor, reporter, institution, name of file, producer, series director, department, interviewer, issuing organization, recipient, or narrator. The tag must be repeated for each person. Synonym of ED.
A3	Tertiary author/editor/translator, e.g. series editor/author, illustrator, editor, higher court, producer, director, international author, publisher, or advisor. The tag must be repeated for each person. Collaborators.
A4	Subsidiary/quaternary author/editor/translator, e.g. translator, counsel, sponsor, funding agency, performers, producer, department/division, or volume editor. The tag must be repeated for each person.
A5	Quinary author / compiler.
A6	Website editor.
AB	Abstract or synopsis. Notes. Synonym of N2.
AD	(Author/editor/inventor) address, e.g. postal address, email address, phone number, and/or fax number. Institution.
AN	Accession number.
AU	(Primary) author/editor/translator, e.g. author, artist, created by, attribution, programmer, investigators, editor, director, interviewee, cartographer, composer, reporter, inventor, or institution. The tag must be repeated for each person. Synonym of A1.
AV	Notes. Availability (description of where to find it). Location in archives.
BT	Primary/secondary title. For Whole Book (BOOK) and Unpublished Work (UNPB) references, this maps to T1 or TI; for all other types, this maps to T2. Subtitle. Book title.
C1	Custom 1, e.g. legal note, cast, author affiliation, section, place published, time period, term, year cited, government body, contact name, scale, format of music, column, or sender's e-mail.
C2	Custom 2, e.g. PMCID, credits, year published, unit of observation, date cited, congress number, contact address, area, form of composition, issue, issue date, recipients e-mail, or report number.
C3	Custom 3, e.g. size/length, title prefix, proceedings title, data type, PMCID, congress session, contact phone, size, music parts, or designated states.
C4	Custom 4, e.g. reviewer, dataset(s), genre, contact fax, target audience, or attorney/agent.
C5	Custom 5, e.g. format, packaging method, issue title, last update date, funding number, accompanying matter, format/length, references, or publisher.
C6	Custom 6, e.g. NIHMSID, CFDA number, legal status, issue, or volume.
C7	Custom 7, e.g. article number or PMCID.
C8	Custom 8, not used by any of the standard types.
CA	Caption.
CL	Classification.
CN	Call number.
CP	City/place of publication. Issue.
CR	Cited references.
CT	Caption. Primary title. Address. Title of unpublished reference.
CY	Place published, e.g. city, conference location, country, or activity location.
DA	Date, e.g. date accessed, last update date, date decided, date of collection, date released, deadline, date of code edition, or date enacted.
DB	Name of database.
DI	Digital Object Identifier (DOI).
DO	Digital Object Identifier (DOI). This used to be documented as "Document Object Index".
DOI	Digital Object Identifier (DOI).
DP	Database provider.
DS	Data source.
ED	Secondary author. Editor. Synonym of A2. Edition.
EP	Pages. End page.
ER	End of reference. Must be the last tag.
ET	Edition, e.g. epub (electronic publication?) date, date published, session, action of higher court, version, requirement, description of material, international patent classification, or description.
FD	Free-form publication data.
H1	Location (library).
H2	Location (call number).
ID	Reference identifier, may be limited to 20 alphanumeric characters.
IP	Identifying phrase.
IS	Number, e.g. issue or number of volumes.
J1	Notes. User abbreviation 1 of journal/periodical name.
J2	Alternate title, e.g. alternate journal, abbreviated publication, abbreviation, or alternate magazine. If possible, it should be a standard abbreviation, preferably using the Index Medicus style including periods. This field is used for the abbreviated title of a book or journal name, the latter mapped to T2. User abbreviation 2 of journal/periodical name.
JA	Standard abbreviation for journal/periodical name.
JF	Full name of journal/periodical.
JO	Abbreviation (for journal/periodical name). "Periodical name: full format. This is an alphanumeric field of up to 255 characters."
K1	Keyword.
KW	Keyword/phrase. Must be at most 255 characters long. May be repeated any number of times to add multiple keywords.
L1	File attachments, e.g. figure. "Link to PDF. There is no practical length limit to this field. URL addresses can be entered individually, one per tag or multiple addresses can be entered on one line using a semi-colon as a separator. These links should end with a file name, and not simply a landing page. Use the UR tag for URL links." Internet link. Local file.
L2	URL. "Link to Full-text. There is no practical length limit to this field. URL addresses can be entered individually, one per tag or multiple addresses can be entered on one line using a semi-colon as a separator." Internet link.
L3	DOI. Related records. Internet link.
L4	Figure, e.g. URL or file attachments. Images. Internet link. Local file.
LA	Language.
LB	Label.
LK	Links.
LL	Sponsoring library location.
M1	Number, publication number, text number, size, bill number, series volume, computer, issue, chapter, status, document number, start page, issue number, folio number, number of screens, application number, number of pages, public law number, or access date. Miscellaneous 1. A good place for type or genre information.
M2	Start page, notes, or number of pages. Miscellaneous 2.
M3	Type of work, e.g. type (of work/article/medium/image); citation of reversal; medium; funding, patent, or thesis type; format; or form of item. Miscellaneous 3. Suitable to hold the medium.
N1	Notes.
N2	Abstract. Synonym of AB.
NO	Notes.
NV	Number of volumes, e.g. extent of work, reporter abbreviation, catalog number, study number, document number, version, amount received, session number, frequency, manuscript number, US patent classification, communication number, series volume, or statute number. Ignored for Press Release (PRESS).
OL	Output language (using one of the documented numeric codes).
OP	Original publication, e.g. contents, history, content, version history, original grant number, or priority numbers. Other pages. Original foreign title.
PA	Personal notes.
PB	Publisher, e.g. court, distributor, sponsoring agency, library/archive, assignee, institution, source, or university / degree grantor.
PMCID	PMCID.
PMID	PMID.
PP	Place of publication.
PY	(Primary) (publication) year/date, e.g. year decided, year of conference, or year released. Must always use 4 digits, with leading zeros if before 1000. Synonym of Y1.
RD	Retrieved date.
RI	Reviewed item, geographic coverage, or article number.
RN	Research notes.
RP	Reprint status, e.g. reprint edition, review date, or notes. Has three possible values: "IN FILE", "NOT IN FILE", or "ON REQUEST". "ON REQUEST" must be followed by an MM/DD/YY date in parentheses.
RT	Reference type.
SE	Section, screens, code section, message number, pages, chapter, filed date, number of pages, original release date, version, e-pub date, duration of grant, section number, start page, international patent number, or running time.
SF	Subfile/database.
SL	Sponsoring library.
SN	ISSN, ISBN, or report/document/patent number.
SP	Pages, description, code pages, number of pages, first/start page, or running time.
SR	Source type: Print(0) or Electronic(1).
ST	Short title or abbreviated case name.
SV	Series volume.
T1	(Primary) title.
T2	Secondary title, journal, periodical, publication title, code, title of weblog, series title, book title, image source program, conference name, dictionary title, periodical title, encyclopedia title, committee, program, title number, magazine, collection title, album title, newspaper, published source, title of show, section title, academic department, or full journal name. Subtitle.
T3	Tertiary title, volume title, series title, legislative body, institution, decision, website title, location of work, supplement no., international title, paper number, international source, or department.
TA	Translated author.
TI	(Primary) title, e.g. title of entry/grant/podcast/work, case name, or name of act.
TT	Translated title.
TY	Type of reference. Must be the first tag.
U1	Notes. User definable 1. Thesis-type hint.
U2–U5	Notes. User definable 2–5.
U6–U15	User definable 6–15.
UR	Web/URL. Can be repeated for multiple tags, or multiple URLs can be entered in the same tag as a semicolon-separated list.
VL	Volume, code volume, access year, reporter volume, image size, edition, amount requested, rule number, volume/storage container, number, patent version number, code number, or degree.
VO	Volume. Published Standard number.
WP	Date of electronic publication.
WT	Website title.
WV	Website version.
Y1	"Year///Date". Primary date/year. Synonym of PY.
Y2	Access date or date enacted. Secondary date. Date of publication.
YR	Publication year.

== Type of reference ==
The type of reference preceded by the TY - tag must abbreviated as:

RIS reference types
Abbreviation ("Field Label")	Type ("Ref Type")	Category
ABST	Abstract	Journal Article
ADVS	Audiovisual (material)	Audiovisual Material
AGGR	Aggregated database	Aggregated Database
ANCIENT	Ancient text	Ancient Text
ART	Artwork	Artwork
BILL	Bill/resolution	Bill (was Bill, Unenacted Bill)
BLOG	Blog	Blog
BOOK	Book (whole)	Book
CASE	Legal case and case notes	Case
CHAP	Book section/chapter	Book Section
CHART	Chart	Chart
CLSWK	Classical work	Classical Work
COMP	Computer program	Computer Program
CONF	Conference proceedings	Conference Proceedings
CPAPER	Conference paper	Conference Paper
CTLG	Catalog	Catalog
DATA	Data file / dataset	Dataset (was Data File) AND Computer Program
DBASE	Online database	Online Database
DICT	Dictionary	Dictionary
EBOOK	Electronic book	Electronic Book
ECHAP	Electronic book section	Electronic Book Section
EDBOOK	Edited book	Edited Book
EJOUR	Electronic article	Electronic Article
ELEC	Web page / electronic citation	Web Page
ENCYC	Encyclopedia	Encyclopedia
EQUA	Equation	Equation
FIGURE	Figure	Figure
GEN	Generic	Generic
GOVDOC	Government document	Government Document
GRNT	Grant	Grant
HEAR	Hearing	Hearing
ICOMM	Internet communication	Personal Communication
INPR	In press article	Journal Article
INTV	Interview	Interview
JFULL	Journal/periodical (full)	Journal Article
JOUR	Journal/periodical (article)	Journal Article
LEGAL	Legal rule (or regulation)	Legal Rule
MANSCPT	Manuscript	Manuscript
MAP	Map or cartographic data	Map
MGZN	Magazine (article)	Magazine Article
MPCT	Film or broadcast / motion picture	Film or Broadcast
MULTI	Online multimedia	Online Multimedia
MUSIC	Music (score)	Music
NEWS	Newspaper (article)	Newspaper Article
PAMP	Pamphlet	Pamphlet
PAT	Patent	Patent
PCOMM	Personal communication	Personal Communication
POD	Podcast	Podcast
PRESS	Press release	Press Release
RPRT	Report	Report
SER	Serial (book, monograph)	Serial
SLIDE	Slide	Audiovisual Material
SOUND	Sound recording	Audiovisual Material
STAND	Standard	Standard
STAT	Statute	Statute
STD	Generic	
THES	Thesis/dissertation	Thesis
UNBILL	Unenacted bill/resolution	Bill (was Bill, Unenacted Bill)
UNPB	Unpublished work	Unpublished Work
UNPD	Unpublished work	
VIDEO	Video recording	Audiovisual Material
WEB	Web page	

== See also ==
- BIBFRAME—bibliographic framework, an emerging standard to replace MARC
- Bibliographic record—general concept
- BibTeX—a text-based data format used by LaTeX
- EndNote—a text-based data scheme used by the EndNote program
- MARC—machine-readable cataloging standards
- refer—troff preprocessor for bibliographic references
