= Reference management software =

Software to use for recording and utilising bibliographic citations (references)

Reference management software, citation management software, or bibliographic management software is software that stores a database of bibliographic records and produces bibliographic citations (references) for those records, needed in scholarly research. Once a record has been stored, it can be used time and again in generating bibliographies, such as lists of references in scholarly books and articles.

Modern reference management applications can usually be integrated with word processors so that a reference list in one of the many different bibliographic formats required by publishers and scholarly journals is produced automatically as an article is written, reducing the risk that a cited source is not included in the reference list. They will also have a facility for importing bibliographic records from bibliographic databases.

Reference management software does not do the same job as a bibliographic database that tries to store records of all publications published within a given scope such as a particular academic discipline or group of disciplines. Such bibliographic databases are large and have to be housed on major server installations. Reference management software collects a much smaller database, of the publications that have been used or are likely to be used by a particular researcher or group of researchers, and such a database can easily be stored on an individual's personal computer.

Many reference management applications enable users to search bibliographic records in online bibliographic databases and library catalogs. An early communications protocol used to access library catalogs, and still in service at many libraries, is Z39.50, which predated the invention of the World Wide Web. Although Z39.50 is still in use, today most bibliographic databases are available as web sites that allow exporting selected bibliographic records in various bibliographic data formats that are imported by reference management software.

== Citation creators ==
Citation creators or citation generators are online tools which facilitate the creation of works cited and bibliographies. Citation creators use web forms to take input and format the output according to guidelines and standards, such as the Modern Language Association's MLA Style Manual, American Psychological Association's APA style, The Chicago Manual of Style, or Turabian format. Some citation creators generate only run-time output, while others store the citation data for later use.

== Research on software usage ==
In 2013, a comparison of usage of EndNote, RefWorks, and Zotero among the legal scholars at the Oxford University Law Faculty was performed by survey. 0% of survey participants used RefWorks; 40% used Endnote; 17% used Zotero, mostly research students. The difficulty of using RefWorks, Endnote, and Zotero by Oxford legal scholars was estimated by the author as well. A comparison of these tools for legal scholars was made across several usage scenarios, including: installing and setting up OSCOLA citation style; building a personal legal bibliographic library and using extracting metadata from legal bibliographic databases; generating footnotes and bibliographies for academic publications; using and modifying OSCOLA citation style.

In the same year, a survey conducted at the University of Turin found that knowledge of software was high but adoption was not, and the most known and used software was EndNote.

== See also ==
- Comparison of reference management software
- COinS – method to embed bibliographic metadata in the HTML code of web pages
- Z39.50 – international standard client–server, application layer communications protocol for searching and retrieving information from a database over a TCP/IP computer network; widely used in library environments
