= Jay Jordan (businessman) =

American business executive (born 1943)

- Born: Robert L. Jordan; 1943 (age 82–83)
- Education: Colgate University
- Occupation: Business executive

Robert L. Jordan (born 1943), known as Jay Jordan, is an American business executive who most recently served as president and executive officer of OCLC, an international computer library network and conglomerate of databases and Web services. He served as president of OCLC from 1998 to his retirement in June 2013, and was succeeded in that position by Skip Prichard.

== Biography ==
Jay Jordan earned a bachelor's degree in English literature from Colgate University. He served in the US Army from March 1966 to March 1969, and was stationed in Germany. He became a first lieutenant. After working for 3M in Europe and the United States, he joined Information Handling Services, where he worked for 24 years and was president of one of its divisions, IHS Engineering. In 1998, he became president and CEO of OCLC. Jordan was the fourth president of OCLC, after Frederick G. Kilgour, Rowland C. W. Brown and K. Wayne Smith.

== OCLC ==
At the time Jordan joined OCLC, the nonprofit organization represented around 8,300 member libraries. 14 years later technological developments had completely changed the information society and the use of libraries. During Jordan's term as president, OCLC tried to adapt to these new developments. WorldCat holdings grew during this period (to around 270 million bibliographic records), member libraries increased to around 22,500, and WorldCat.org was made available on the open web. At the same time, OCLC developed new services (like QuestionPoint). OCLC made several acquisitions such as the Research Libraries Group (2006), PICA (2007), Ezproxy (2008) and OAIster (2009). OCLC sold NetLibrary in 2010. VIAF was implemented and hosted by OCLC. VIAF is a service to link identical records from different data sets together, thereby making it easier for patrons to find e.g. books from Dostoyevsky/Dostoïevski

During Jordan's presidency, OCLC also created a library advocacy program ("Geek the library"). It invested in new computer infrastructure, so it could handle non-Roman scripts. OCLC introduced new initiatives to make libraries and their paper and digital holdings more visible. CONTENTdm was set up to create better and stable online visibility for special collections and art treasures.

In June 2012 Jay Jordan announced that he would postpone his retirement, which was planned for that year, and continue leading OCLC until June 2013. In May 2013 OCLC announced Skip Prichard to be the new CEO and President of OCLC as of July 2013.

Non-profit organization positions
Preceded by K. Wayne Smith	President of OCLC; 1998–2013	Succeeded by Skip Prichard
