= European Register of Microform and Digital Masters =

International library consortium

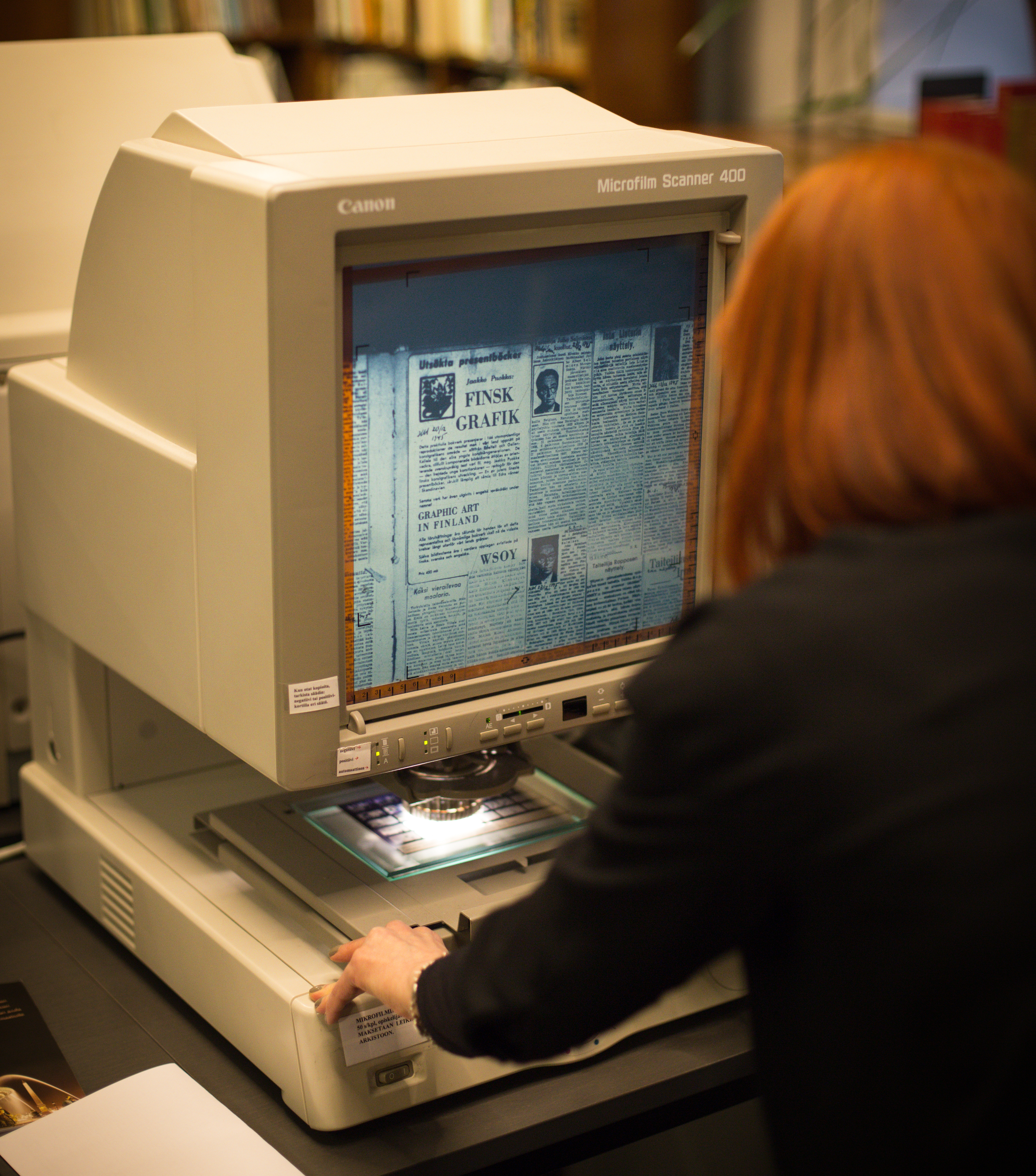
A microfiche reader being used to view reproductions of historical documents

The European Register of Microform and Digital Masters (EROMM) was an international library consortium that maintained a searchable database of microform and digital reproductions. EROMM ceased operations in 2022, but its online catalogue is still available as a read-only resource. The EROMM database is hosted by the Göttingen State and University Library in Göttingen, Germany and has been accessible to the general public since 2007.

Launched in 1994 as a pilot project by the European Commission, EROMM reduced duplication of efforts among European libraries preserving decaying books and documents on microform, an expensive process. In 2006, EROMM started tracking digital reproductions in addition to microform, and in 2011, it began hosting a second database, EROMM Web Search, that focused only on digital documents.

By the time of its sunset in 2022, EROMM had accumulated over 48 million records across its EROMM Classic and EROMM Web Search databases, with 8 active member libraries and 6 former member libraries.

== History ==
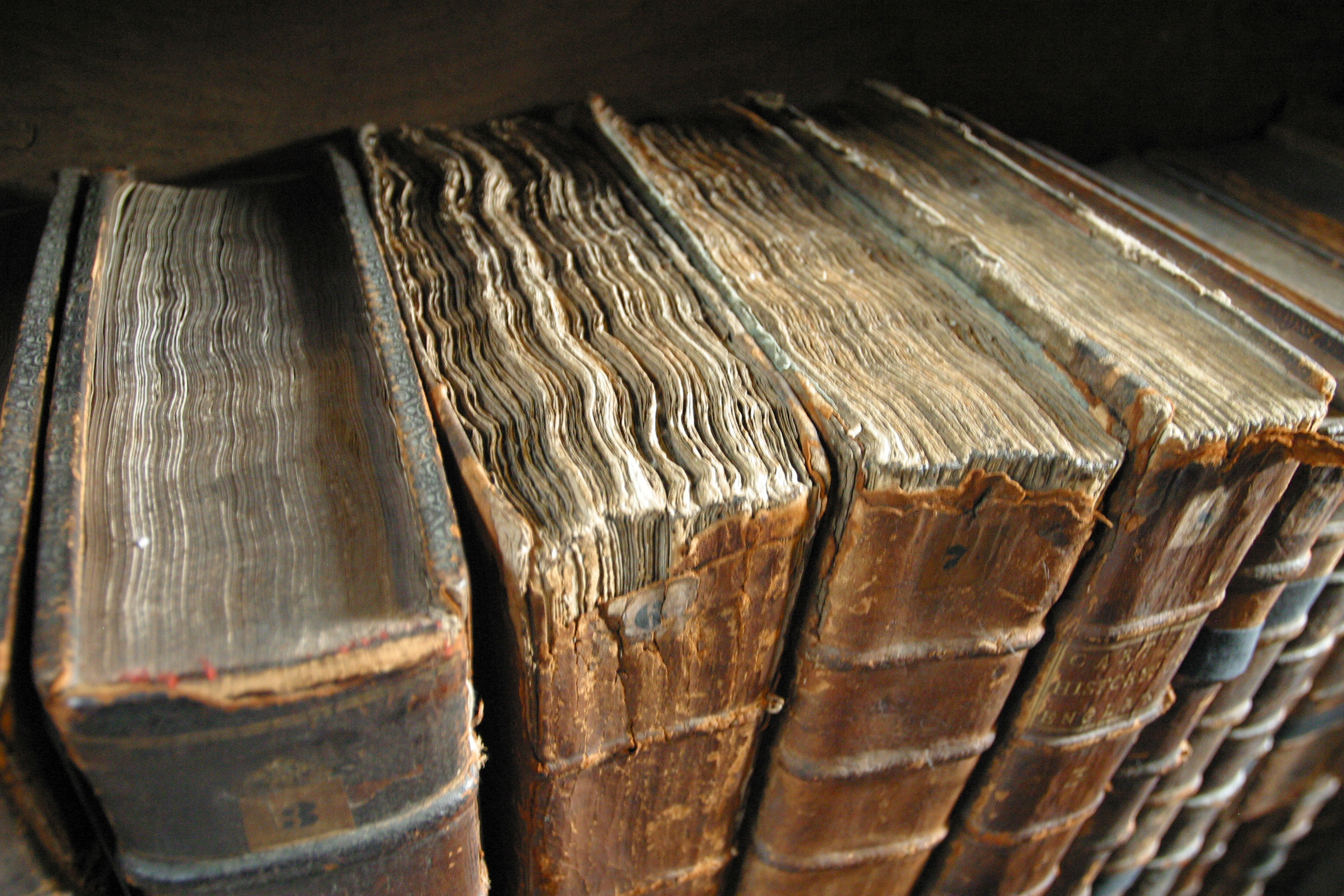
Books in a state of deterioration

=== Historical context and feasibility study ===
Until the late 1970s, preservation efforts by libraries were considered unimportant and were not prioritized. By the mid-1980s, however, interest in preservation had increased, and several international organizations had begun initiatives encouraging preservation efforts. In 1984, the recently established Preservation and Conservation programme of the International Federation of Library Associations and Institutions (IFLA) brought the issue of document preservation to prominent concern.

On 27 September 1985, the European Communities (now the European Union) passed a resolution requesting European libraries to increase cooperation with each other, and granting authority to the European Commission to aid libraries in their coordination efforts. In 1986, following that resolution, the European Commission began investigating possibilities for a collaborative programme between European libraries. In April 1986, a conference was held in Vienna, Austria, by the IFLA, the United Nations Educational, Scientific and Cultural Organization (UNESCO), and the Conference of Directors of National Libraries (CDNL), discussing the topic of preservation. Many of the conference's speakers, including administrators at the Library of Congress and the British Library, expressed concern about the rate at which important historical works were deteriorating.

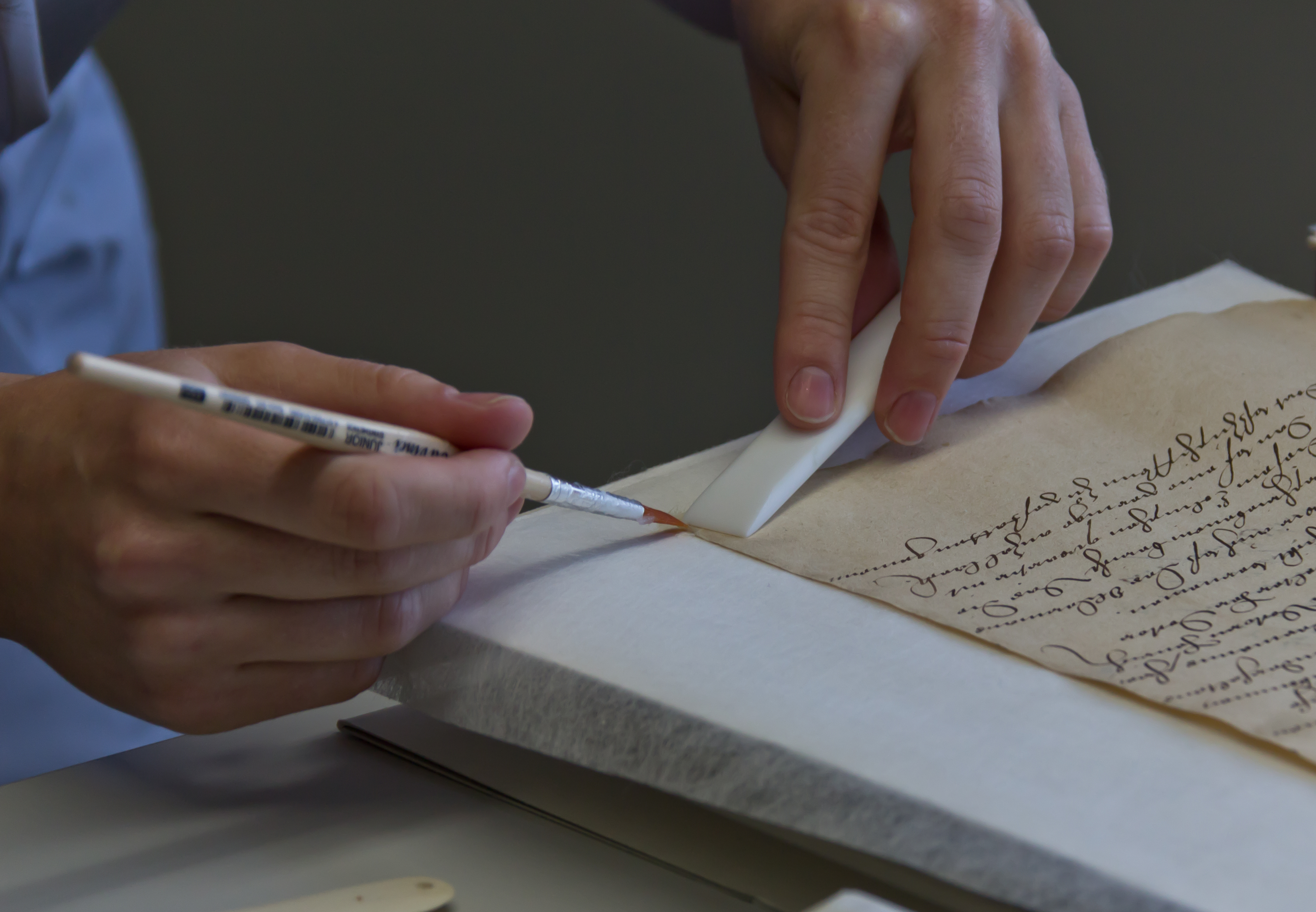
Time consuming manual book conservation

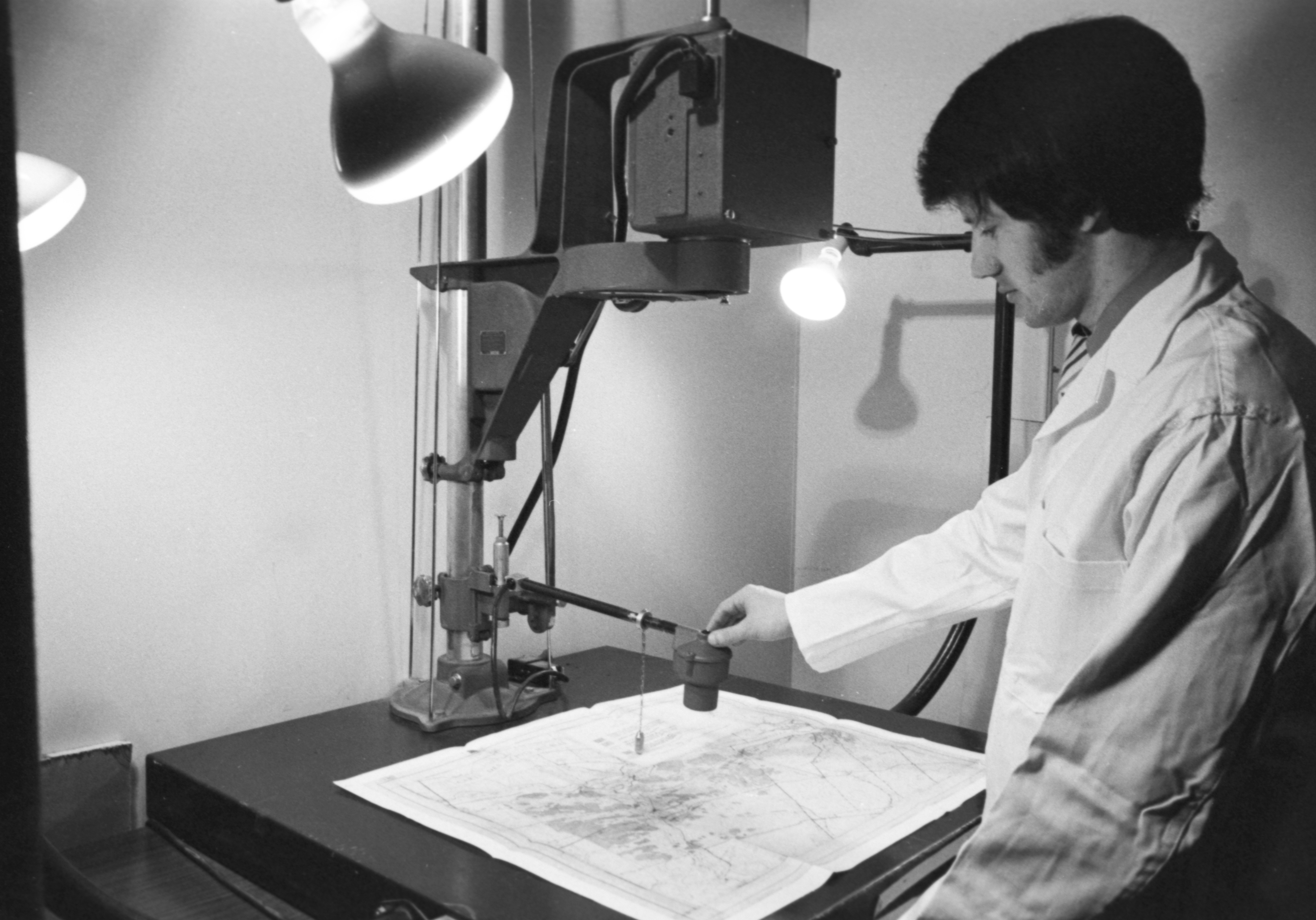
The process of scanning a document to microfilm

The conference in Vienna confirmed the importance of preservation in library management. However, traditional, manual preservation methods were too slow for the rapid rate of deterioration of libraries' historical archives. Another potential preservation medium, optical discs, was not yet in general use. Since the 1930s, microform had been a recognized method to preserve copies of books and documents efficiently and relatively cheaply. Amid concerns about file format interoperability and the durability of electronic storage media such as hard disks, microform reproduction was also considered longer-lasting than digitization. However, with libraries struggling under financial cuts, and the high price of microfilm scanning, efforts to archive works on microform needed to be as efficient as possible. The Library of Congress's National Register of Microform Masters, automated since 1983, and a similar register maintained by the Research Libraries Group had both been accumulating records for several years. However, despite master microform registers created by the Bibliothèque nationale de France, the British Library, and various efforts in Germany, there were few successful centralized microform databases in Europe.

In a 1986 poll by the Association of European Research Libraries (LIBER), two-thirds of responding member libraries indicated interest in a European microform register. A report commissioned by the European Commission, finalized in 1988, recommended the creation of such a register. Following that report, the Vienna conference, and the LIBER poll, the European Commission launched a feasibility study for the creation of a European Register of Microform Masters. The study was completed in the summer of 1989, and the report recommended the creation of an EROMM pilot programme with four founding members: the Biblioteca Nacional in Portugal, the Bibliothèque nationale in France, the British Library in England, and the Göttingen State and University Library in Germany.

=== Pilot programme ===
The European Commission held a workshop in Luxembourg on 7 December 1989, during which the recommendations in the feasibility report were approved and EROMM's initial management committee was elected, with a member serving from each of the four founding institutions. The creation of EROMM had officially commenced, with its database to be hosted at the Bibliothèque nationale de France. Between 1991 and 1993, the founding institutions filed their microform reproductions into a central database using the UNIMARC format. As the project entered its working phase with the founding agreement finalized in May 1994, the host was changed from the Bibliothèque nationale to the Göttingen State and University Library, and four new partners joined the pilot programme.

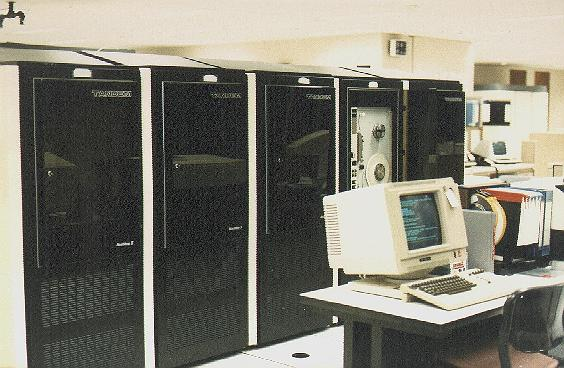
A Tandem NonStop server, similar to what was initially used to host EROMM

EROMM was opened to online access by participating libraries in December 1994 through both the Internet and the X.25 protocol. Before scanning materials to microform, libraries could check the EROMM database to see if the scanning work was already completed or underway by another library, preventing unnecessary duplicate work. The database was initially powered by a Tandem computer running PICA database software.

At the time, EROMM was not intended as an online catalogue; it was only a tool for libraries to avoid duplicating scanning effort, not a tool for the public to locate items. Researchers were intended to research microform content using their local library, and if the library discovered via EROMM that the microform master was owned by another institution, the library could order a service copy for the customer.

=== Later years and shutdown ===
Between the launch of the pilot programme and the mid-2000s, EROMM's record count grew steadily as six new partner libraries joined, bringing the total number of partners to fourteen. EROMM became an important system that had proven itself effective at optimizing libraries' archiving efforts. With increased confidence in digital archiving technology, libraries had begun to digitize their collections and purchase digital materials, and in 2006, EROMM added functionality for libraries to record digitized materials in addition to microform reproductions. EROMM also partnered with the Registry of Digital Masters (RDM), an initiative created by the American library organization OCLC. Through the cooperation, RDM records became available through EROMM, and vice versa.

In 2007, EROMM opened to the general public. It was no longer just a system for cross-library coordination, but also a tool for members of the public to locate materials among participating libraries. By 2011, EROMM's existing capabilities were unable to keep pace with the rapid emergence of digitization projects, and EROMM Web Search was launched: a new database for the semi-automated ingest of large quantities of digital sources. The older system would be called EROMM Classic, and both databases could be searched at the same time using the EROMM Search interface.

Over the following decade, EROMM grew rapidly to over 40 million records in 2020. Following a partnership with the Répertoire International des Sources Musicales (RISM), digitized sheet music from the RISM also became available through EROMM Search that year. However, with the rise of digitization and the Internet, EROMM was not as popular or comprehensive as some modern platforms that had arisen during the 2000s, such as Google Books, which began mass scanning books in 2004, and OCLC's WorldCat, whose centralized database of catalogue entries had been open to the public since 2006. EROMM shut down in 2022, with its search functionality to be maintained for the foreseeable future but no new records added to its databases.

== Structure ==
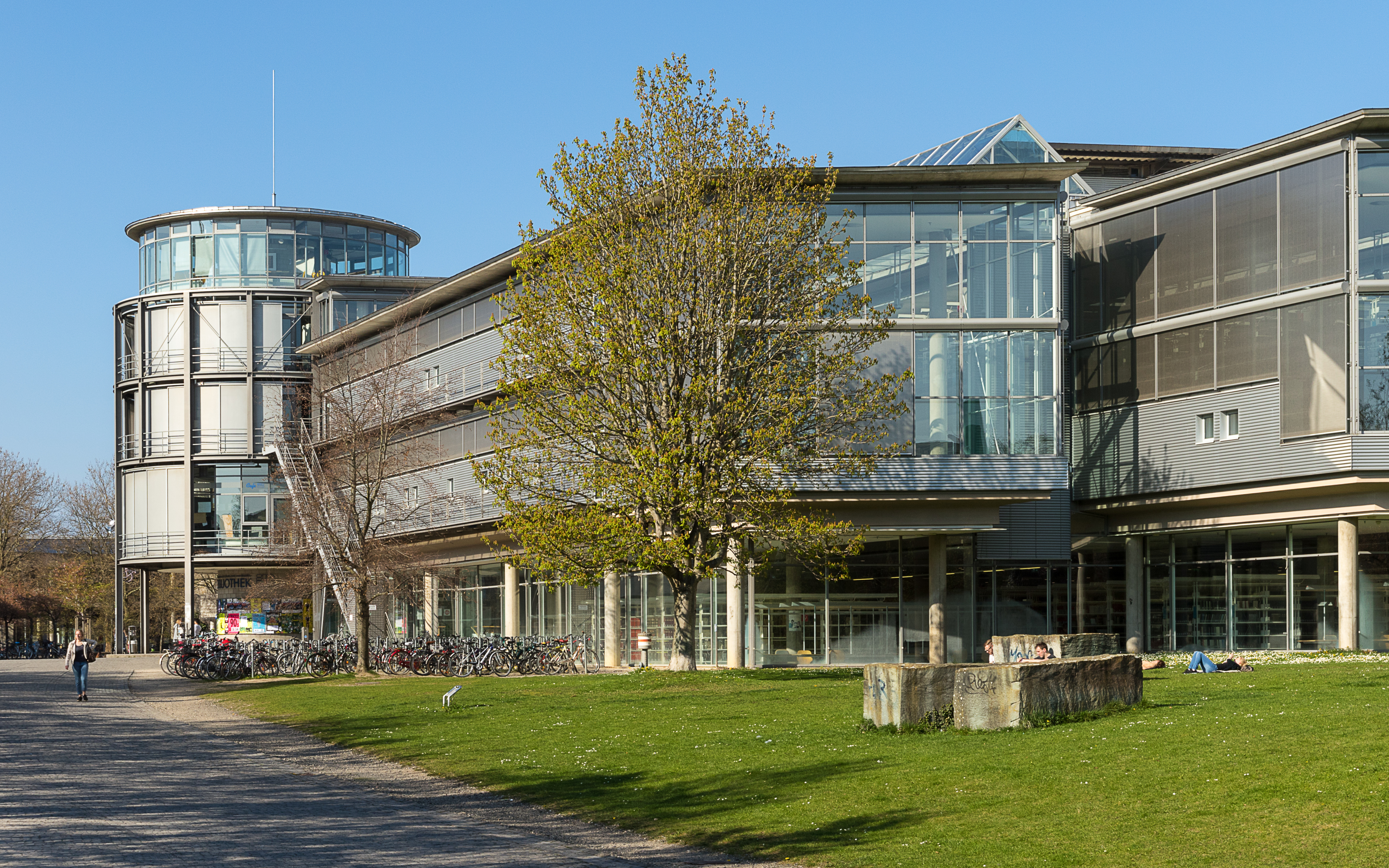
The Göttingen State and University Library, where the EROMM database is hosted

EROMM was structured as a cooperative association of prominent libraries across multiple countries. Member libraries contributed to EROMM's funding and were responsible for collecting records from their databases and the databases of other libraries in their countries, and synchronizing them with the EROMM system. EROMM's searchable datasets were also expanded to include data from institutional partnerships with organizations like OCLC and the RISM.

Since 2007, EROMM has been accessible to the general public. The primary online search tool, EROMM Search, is able to search across EROMM's two separate databases:

1. EROMM Classic, the original 1991 system for tracking microform and digital reproductions created by participating libraries
2. EROMM Web Search, a system created in 2011 with support for a wide variety of digital formats and semi-automated ingest, but less detailed bibliographic metadata than EROMM Classic

== Members ==
At the time of its sunset in 2022, EROMM had 8 active members and 6 former members.

Active members at EROMM's sunset:

- Bibliothèque nationale de France (founding member)
- Göttingen State and University Library in Germany (founding member)
- Cantonal and University Library of Lausanne in Switzerland
- Royal Library of Belgium
- Head Office of the Common Library Network in Germany
- Royal Library of Denmark
- Royal Library of the Netherlands
- National Library of Sweden

Former members:

- British Library in England (founding member)
- Biblioteca Nacional de Portugal (founding member)
- ETH Library in Switzerland
- National Library of the Czech Republic
- National Library of Russia
- National Library of Finland
