= Kvk =

Kvk, KvK, or KVK may refer to:

- KVK-Tech, American pharmaceutical company
- Kinderen voor Kinderen, a Dutch children's choir
- Karlsruher Virtueller Katalog, a book search engine
- Kriegsverdienstkreuz, literally War Merit Cross, a war medal from Nazi Germany
- Kamer van Koophandel, the Dutch chamber of commerce
- K.V. Kortrijk, a Belgian association football club
- Krishi Vigyan Kendra, agricultural extension centers in India
- K. V. Kandaswamy (1926–2008), an Indian politician
- Kendriya Vidyalaya Katihar, a high school in Katihar, India
