= Bavarian Library Network =

German library association

The Bavarian Library Network (German: Bibliotheksverbund Bayern, abbreviated BVB) is a library association of more than 150 academic libraries in Bavaria, Germany. It operates a union catalog, the Bavarian Union Catalog. The catalog is not part of K10plus.

Based in Munich, it is one of the main library consortia in Germany, which lacks a singular, centralized institution.

== Bibliography ==
- Ceynowa, Klaus (June 15, 2019). "Ordnung muss sein! Die Verbund- und Geschäftsordnung für den Bibliotheksverbund Bayern". Zeitschrift für Bibliothekswesen und Bibliographie. 66 (3): 120–125. doi:10.3196/186429501966324. ISSN 0044-2380.
- Taylor, Arlene G.; Tillett, Barbara B. (2004). "The Library Situation in the Bavarian Library Network". Authority Control in Organizing and Accessing Information: Definition and International Experience. Routledge. pp. 422–. ISBN 978-0-7890-2715-3.
