= Jay Jordan =

Jay Jordan may refer to:

- Jay Jordan (businessman) (born 1943), American business executive Robert L. Jordan
- Jay Jordan (politician) (born 1980), American politician
