= Union catalog =

Combined library catalog describing the collections of a number of libraries

A union catalog is a combined library catalog describing the collections of a number of libraries. Union catalogs have been created in a range of media, including book format, microform, cards and more recently, networked electronic databases. Print union catalogs are typically arranged by title, author or subject (often employing a controlled vocabulary); electronic versions typically support keyword and Boolean queries. Union catalogs are useful to librarians, as they assist in locating and requesting materials from other libraries through interlibrary loan service. They also allow researchers to search through collections to which they would not otherwise have access, such as manuscript collections.

The largest union catalog ever printed is the American National Union Catalog Pre-1956 Imprints (NUC), completed in 1981. This achievement has since been superseded by the creation of union catalogs in the form of electronic databases, of which the largest is OCLC's WorldCat. Other examples include K10plus in Germany, Library Hub Discover (formerly COPAC) provided by Research Libraries UK and AMICUS, provided by Library and Archives Canada.

For academic publications, several academic search engines exist to combine the open data provided by open archives through OAI-PMH, as well as records from publishers deposited in CrossRef and other sources. They include BASE, CORE and Unpaywall, which indexes over 20 million open access publications as of 2020.

== Historical development ==
The idea of sharing catalogue records among libraries is at least as old as the French Revolution, when a cataloguing standard was published encouraging librarians throughout France to contribute to cataloguing the nation's books by writing records on the backs of playing cards and mailing them off to the home of the national library in Paris. The idea was thus common knowledge among librarians throughout the 19th century. Nonetheless, it was not until 1901 that the U.S. Library of Congress exchanged cards with the Boston Public Library, Harvard College Library, and the New York Public Library and also began a card publishing service to sell copies of its own catalog cards to public libraries throughout the U.S. Card catalogues grew huge during the next six decades. In the late 1960s, the development of machine-readable cataloguing in computerized and programmable form via the MARC standards meant that union cataloguing from then onward could be done electronically instead of physically.

== See also ==
- OAIster
- SUNCAT – Catalog of serial holdings in the UK
- Trove – Australian online library database aggregator
- Universal Bibliographic Control
- UNIMARC – Digital formats for library cataloguing
- Universal Decimal Classification – Bibliographic and library classification system
- Virtual International Authority File – International authority file
