= Improving Schools =

- Discipline: Education
- Language: English
- Edited by: Terry Wrigley

Publication details
- History: 1998–present
- Publisher: SAGE Publications
- Frequency: Triannually

Standard abbreviations
- ISO 4: Improv. Sch.

Indexing
- ISSN: 1365-4802 (print); 1475-7583 (web)
- LCCN: 2004206661
- OCLC no.: 56561764

Links
- Journal homepage; Online access; Online archive

Improving Schools is a triannual peer-reviewed academic journal that covers the field of education. The journal's editor-in-chief is Terry Wrigley (University of Edinburgh). It was established in 1998 and is currently published by SAGE Publications.

== Abstracting and indexing ==
Improving Schools is abstracted and indexed in:

- Academic Premier
- British Education Index
- Educational Research Abstracts Online
- ERIC
- Research into Higher Education Abstracts
- Scopus
