= K10plus =

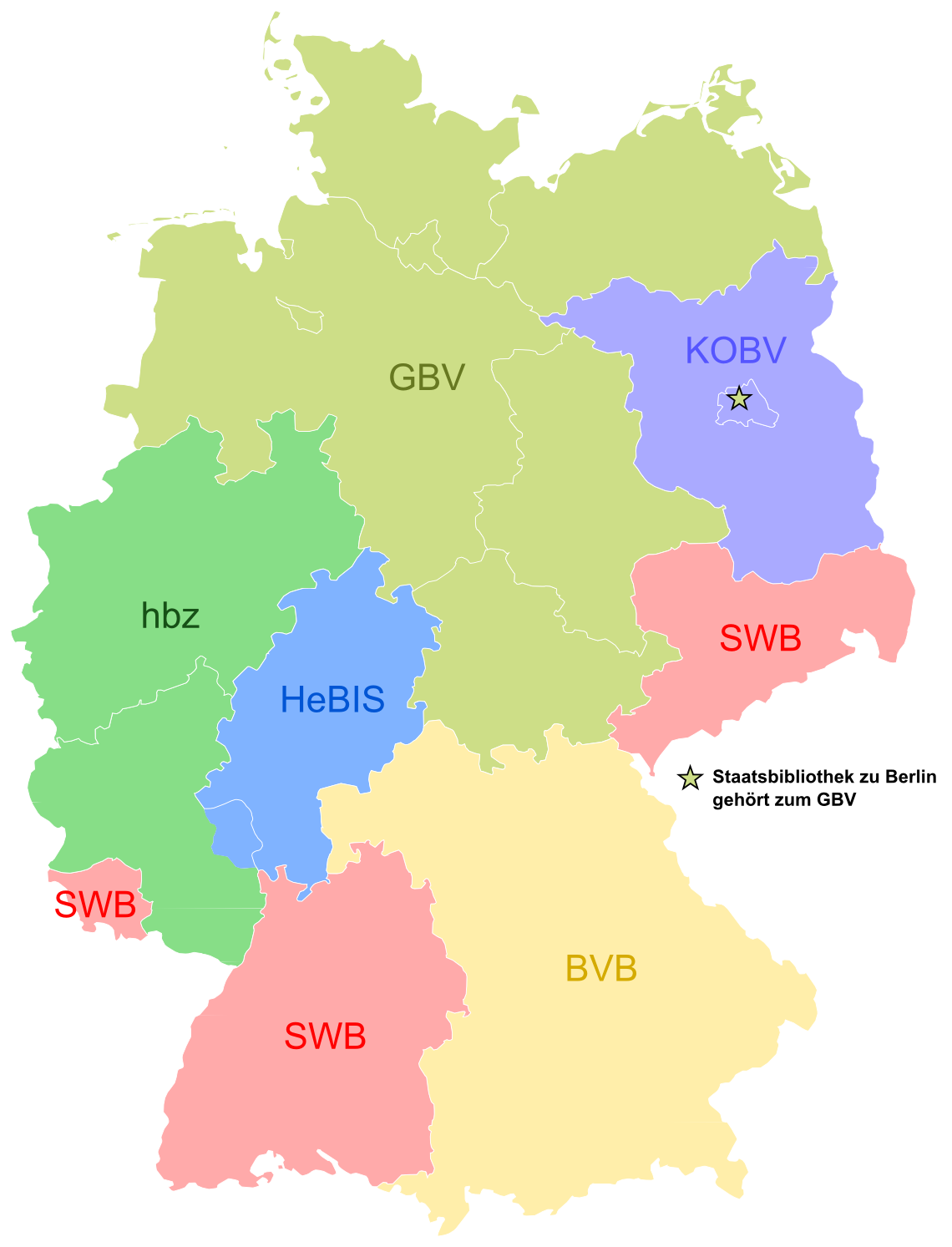
Library networks in Germany: K10plus includes GBV and SWB

K10plus is the union catalog of the German library networks GBV (Common Library Network) and SWB (Southwest German Library Network). It combines the catalogs of the majority of academic libraries in Germany.

K10plus combines the former union catalogs of GBV and SWB covering 10 of 16 states of Germany, the Prussian Cultural Heritage Foundation and other research institutions such as those of Leibniz Association, Helmholtz Association and Max Planck Society. As of March 2023, K10plus contained around 80 million bibliographic records, representing over 200 million physical and digital library assets from more than 1,000 libraries. Large parts of K10plus are exported regularly into WorldCat and make up roughly 10% of it.

K10plus-Zentral is an extension of K10plus with bibliographic data aggregated from other sources such as public libraries, PubMed, JSTOR, arXiv etc. As of March 2023, it contained around 231 million records. The database is run with Solr and can be integrated in various search portals.

== Technology ==
The union catalog is managed with the database management system CBS (Controlled Bibliographic Service) originally developed in the 1980s in the Netherlands and acquired by OCLC in 2002. CBS and K10plus use a custom internal data format called PICA+ but extensions of CBS exist to support MARC21. The CBS data models used in GBV and SWB have been integrated to the common K10plus format. The format consists of bibliographic records and authority records with metadata about publications (main level) and two levels of local and copy records with information about individual library holdings. Records can be linked for authority control and to model connections such as book series.

Database records are mainly edited by member libraries with the cataloging client "WinIBW" and exported to various local library systems, OPACs and search portals, including K10plus-Zentral. Records can be accessed via APIs such as SRU and have been made available as (Linked) Open Data.

== History ==
In June 2014 a collaboration between the Library Service Centre Baden-Württemberg (BSZ) and the head office of the Common Library Network (VZG) was decided and announced by their managing directors at the 103rd German Library Congress in Bremen. A formal contract was signed in September 2015. K10plus went live in March 2019. Both institutions used the CBS database software CBS.
