= OpenAthens =

Identity management service

OpenAthens is an identity and access management service, supplied by Jisc, a British not-for-profit information technology services company. Identity provider (IdP) organisations can keep usernames in the cloud, locally or both. Integration with ADFS, LDAP or SAML is supported.

OpenAthens for Publishers software for service providers supports multiple platforms and federations.

Technically, the service provides deep packet inspection proxying (in a similar manner to EZproxy) and SAML-based federation, as well as various on-boarding services for institutions, consortia and vendors.

== History ==
With its origins in a University of Bath initiative to reduce IT procurement costs for itself and other universities, the Athens project was conceived in 1996. Spun off from Bath University through the vehicle of charitable status, Eduserv was established as a not-for-profit organisation in 1999.

The service was originally named Athena after the Greek goddess of knowledge and learning; it is rumoured that the name change was partially caused by a common typo, but it was actually due to the name Athena being already trademarked (EU000204735). It launched as 'Athens' in 1997 (UK00002153200). After JISC decided to support Shibboleth rather than Athens in 2008, Eduserv launched a federated version of Athens as 'OpenAthens' (EU013713821).

== See also ==
- Federated identity
- SAML 2.0
- SAML-based products and services
- Shibboleth (Shibboleth Consortium)
