= GBV =

GBV may refer to:

- Gbanu language, ISO 639-3 language code gbv
- Common Library Network in Germany (German: Gemeinsamer Bibliotheksverbund, GBV)
- Glenbervie railway station, Victoria, Australia, station code GBV
- Finnish Border Guard (Swedish: Gränsbevakningsväsendet, GBV)
- Guided by Voices, an American indie rock band
- Gender-based violence, an alternative name for gender-related violence

== See also ==
- GB virus C, GBV-C
