= Copac =

Online catalogue for books

Consortium of Online Public Access Catalogues (COPAC)
- Copac was funded by Jisc, to deliver a service to the UK community on the basis of an agreement with Research Libraries UK (RLUK)
- Website type: Union catalogue Bibliographic database
- Available in: English
- Owners: Jisc; Research Libraries UK
- Website: copac.jisc.ac.uk (defunct)
- Current status: Superseded by Library Hub Discover

Copac (originally an acronym of Consortium of Online Public Access Catalogues) was a union catalogue which provided free access to the merged online catalogues of many major research libraries and specialist libraries in the United Kingdom and Ireland, plus the British Library, the National Library of Scotland and the National Library of Wales. It had over 40 million records from around 90 libraries as of 2019, representing a wide range of materials across all subject areas. Copac was freely available to all, and was widely used, with users mainly coming from Higher Education institutions in the United Kingdom, but also worldwide. Copac was valued by users as a research tool.

Copac was searchable through with a web browser or Z39.50 client. It was also accessible through OpenURL and Search/Retrieve via URL (SRU) interfaces. These interfaces could be used to provide links to items on Copac from external sites, such as those used on the Institute of Historical Research website.

Copac was a Jisc service provided for the UK community on the basis of an agreement with Research Libraries UK (RLUK). The service used records supplied by RLUK members, as well as an increasing range of specialist libraries with collections of national research interest. A full list of contributors is available including the National Trust for Places of Historic Interest or Natural Beauty, the Royal Botanic Gardens, Kew, the Middle Temple library and Institution of Mechanical Engineers (IMechE) Library.

In July 2019, Jisc replaced COPAC with Library Hub Discover.

== See also ==
- OPAC
- SUNCAT
- Talis Group
