= Common Library Network (Germany) =

Network of libraries for northern and central Germany

The Common Library Network (German: Gemeinsamer Bibliotheksverbund, abbreviated GBV) is a library network comprising the libraries of seven German states in northern and central Germany, as well as the Prussian Cultural Heritage Foundation, which includes the Berlin State Library. Through its shared catalogue system, GBV streamlines cataloguing, resource sharing, and archiving for more than 400 member libraries. By integrating with the K10plus database, the network expands its reach to encompass catalogues across over 1,000 libraries, and through the Karlsruher Virtueller Katalog, the GBV catalogue is searchable alongside every other German library network.

The members of GBV are:

- Bremen
- Hamburg
- Mecklenburg-Vorpommern
- Lower Saxony
- Saxony-Anhalt
- Schleswig-Holstein
- Thuringia
- Prussian Cultural Heritage Foundation (non-state member)
