= Skip Prichard =

American business executive

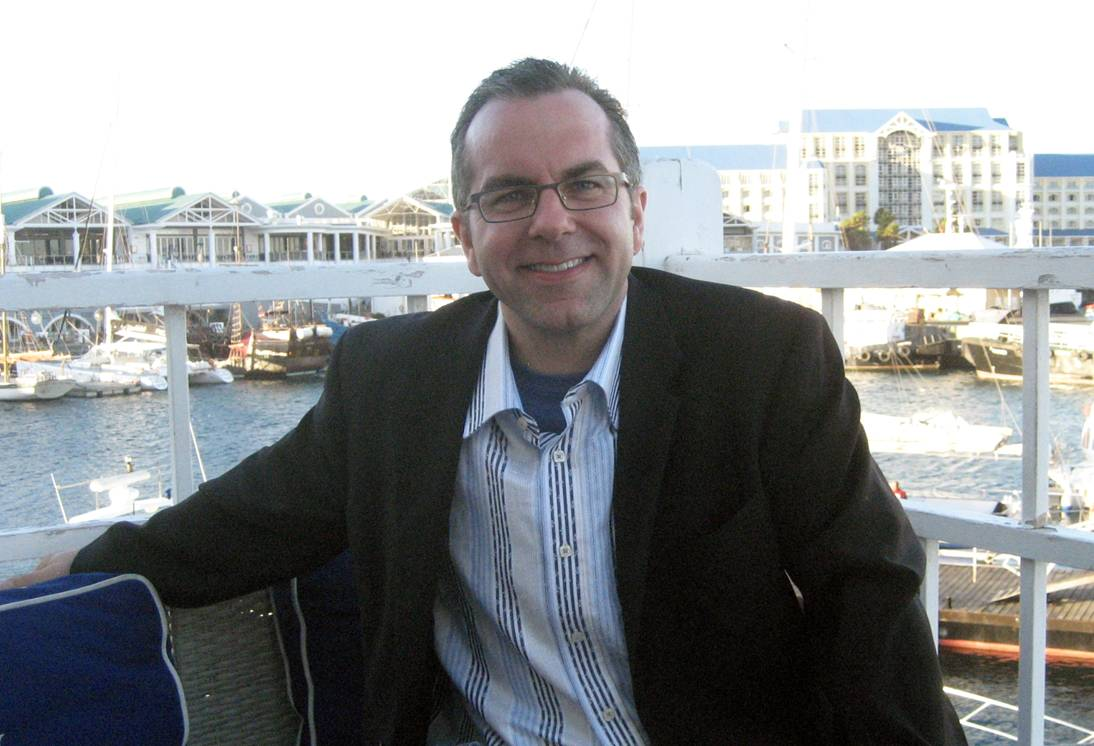
- Prichard in 2014
- Born: David Prichard; New Jersey, U.S.
- Education: Towson University; University of Baltimore
- Title: President and CEO of OCLC (since 2013)
- Website: skipprichard.com

David Prichard, known as Skip Prichard, is an American business executive who serves as president and CEO of OCLC, a global nonprofit computer library service and research organization.

== Early life and education ==
Prichard was born in New Jersey and grew up in Baltimore, Maryland. He earned a Bachelor of Science degree from Towson University and graduated with a Juris Doctor degree from the University of Baltimore School of Law.

== Career ==
Prichard held executive positions with LexisNexis from 1995 to 2003. As vice president, he focused on business information and risk management solutions for corporations, libraries, and other organizations.

Prichard was general manager and senior vice president of sales and marketing at ProQuest Information and Learning, a global publisher and information provider, from April 2003 to October 2005. From October 2005 to April 2007, he served as president and CEO of ProQuest. In February 2006, an accounting irregularity was discovered, creating financial difficulty for the company. In November 2006, ProQuest sold its Business Solutions automotive division to Snap-on Incorporated for $481 million. The proceeds of this transaction were used to repay debt.

Prichard served as COO and then as president and CEO of Ingram Content Group Inc., a print and digital services supplier to the book industry, from August 2007 to June 2012. Prichard was responsible for the $1.5 billion global enterprises that included Ingram Book Group, VitalSource, Coutts Information Services, and Ingram Library Services.

Prichard was named president and CEO of OCLC on July 1, 2013. During his leadership, OCLC has expanded their WorldCat Discovery Services as ProQuest added more than 320 million records, enhancing library discovery. Harvard Business Review noted Prichard as a "standout example" of CEO engagement on social media, writing that he "blogs nonstop on leadership and shares insights from his favorite authors – with no direct benefit to him or his organization." In 2021, Prichard received $2.19 million in total compensation.

In 2017, Prichard published The Book of Mistakes: 9 Secrets to Creating a Successful Future, based on stories culled from interviews of "over a thousand unbelievably successful people ranging from politicians to news anchors to sports heroes." Prichard said, "I wrote it from the mistake angle because I actually learned as much, if not more, from people talking about their mistakes. All of us make mistakes, and the wisdom from these mistakes is often more valuable than advice from the supersuccessful."

== Publications ==
- The Book of Mistakes. 9 Secrets to Creating a Successful Future. [Nashville], Center Street, 2018. ISBN 9781478970903

Non-profit organization positions
Preceded by Jay Jordan	President of OCLC; 2013–president	Incumbent
