= Adam Matthew Digital =

Academic publisher based in the United Kingdom and the United States

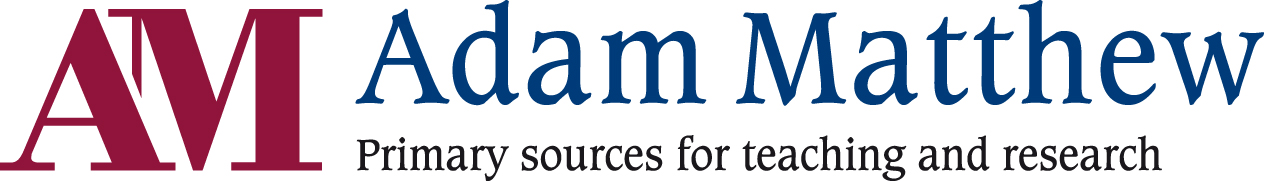
- Parent company: SAGE Publications
- Founded: 1990; 36 years ago
- Founder: David Tyler; William Pidduck
- Country of origin: United Kingdom
- Headquarters location: Marlborough, Wiltshire
- Publication types: databases
- Official website: www.amdigital.co.uk

Adam Matthew Digital is an academic publisher based in the United Kingdom and the United States. It has been an independent subsidiary of SAGE Publications since 2012.

The company specializes in online primary source databases and curated collections for the humanities and social sciences. Its corporate offices are in Marlborough, Wiltshire.

== History ==
Adam Matthew Publications was founded in 1990 by David Tyler and William Pidduck. The company focused on publishing microfilm collections with a back list of over 600 titles until publishing their first ‘digital’ collections in the late 1990s on CD-ROM, and releasing its first truly online resources in the early 2000s. By the mid-2000s, the company directors – now including Khal Rudin – founded Adam Matthew Digital to focus solely on the development and production of digital collections, and began trading as a separate entity from 1 January 2007. On 5 October 2012, the company was acquired by SAGE Publications.

== Collections ==
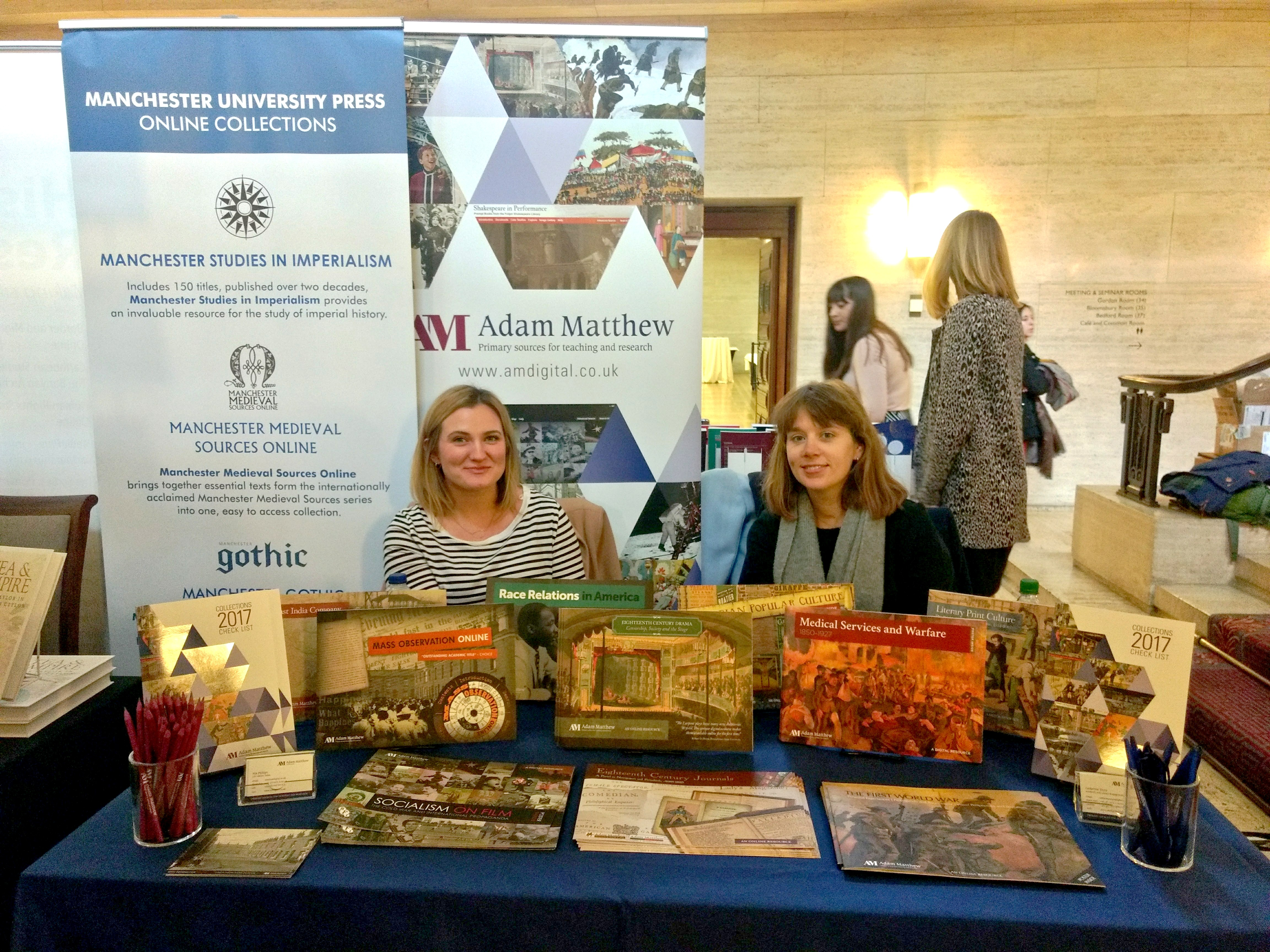
Adam Matthew at the School of Advanced Study History Day 2017.

The company publishes collections of digitized primary source materials from different historical eras. For example, Empire Online covers the histories of colonial era United States, Canada, India, Australia, South Africa, and Britain. Other collection topics include gender studies, American history and consumer culture, Victorian England, Asian history, the First World War, and others.

== Collaborations ==
Adam Matthew have collaborated with various source archives and institutions including the Gilder Lehrman Institute of American History, Newberry Library and The National Archives (United Kingdom). An explanation of their relationship with The National Archives (United Kingdom) has been recorded in a short video which covers the process of selection, preservation and digitisation of materials required to produce resources on topics such as Apartheid South Africa, Confidential Print: Middle East and The Nixon Years.

In January 2016, Adam Matthew partnered with Jisc to provide all UK Higher and Further Education institutions with access to their nineteenth century collection on global immigration, Migration to New Worlds. To gain permanent access without payment, UK institutions can register with Jisc to receive access details for their entire staff and students.

In 2013, the company entered into an agreement with the Texas State Libraries and Archives Commission (TSLAC) to provide permanent access to two Adam Matthew digital collections via the TexShare consortium. The agreement was terminated in 2018.
