= Sage Publishing =

Independent academic publishing company

- Status: Active
- Founded: 1965
- Founder: Sara Miller McCune; George D. McCune
- Country of origin: United States
- Headquarters location: Thousand Oaks, California
- Distribution: Worldwide
- Key people: Blaise R. Simqu, CEO Tejeshwar Singh
- Publication types: Academic books, journals, reference and library products
- Nonfiction topics: Social science, science, medicine, humanities, technology
- Imprints: Corwin, CQ Press, Learning Matters, Talis Group, Lean Library, Adam Matthew
- Official website: www.sagepub.com

Sage Publishing, formerly Sage Publications, is an American independent academic publishing company, founded in 1965 in New York City by Sara Miller McCune and now based in the Newbury Park neighborhood of Thousand Oaks, California.

Sage Publishing has offices located across North America, Europe, and the Asia Pacific region. In North America, Sage Publishing has offices in Los Angeles, Washington DC, and Toronto. The European operations are headquartered in London, United Kingdom. In the Asia Pacific region, Sage Publishing has established offices in Melbourne, Australia, India and Singapore.

It publishes more than 1,000 journals, more than 800 books a year, reference works and electronic products covering business, humanities, social sciences, science, technology and medicine. Sage also owns and publishes under the imprints of Corwin Press (since 1990), CQ Press (since 2008), Learning Matters (since 2011), and Adam Matthew Digital (since 2012).

== History ==
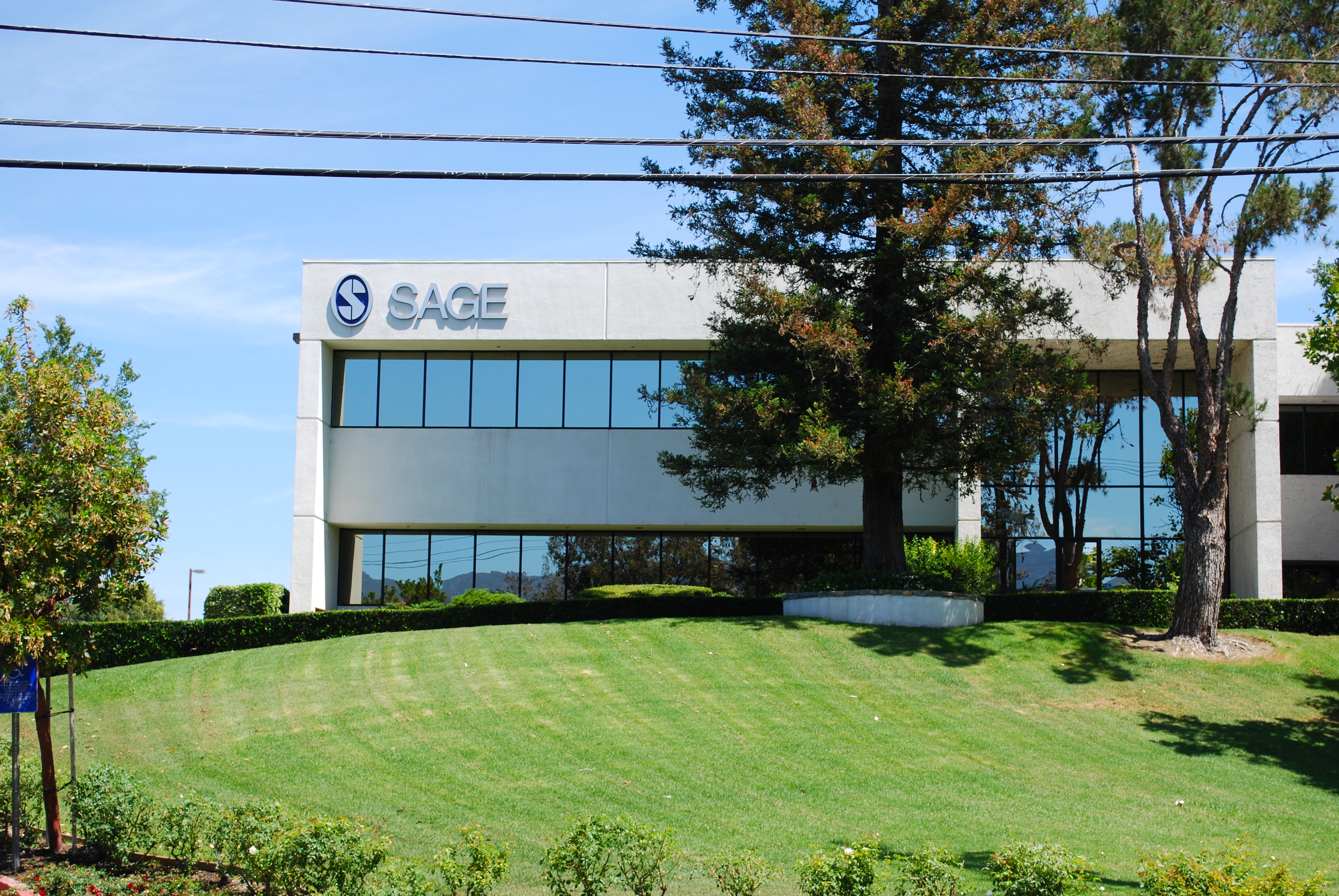
World headquarters, Newbury Park neighborhood of Thousand Oaks, California

Sage was founded in 1965 in New York City by Sara Miller (later Sara Miller McCune) with Macmillan Inc. executive George D. McCune as a mentor; the name of the company is an acronym formed from the first letters of their given names. Sage relocated to Southern California in 1966, after Miller and McCune married; McCune left Macmillan to formally join the company at that time. Sara Miller McCune remained president for 18 years, shifting to board chairman in 1984 (and still retains the title of executive chairman). The couple continued to develop the company together until George McCune's death in 1990.

In 1971, Sage Publications, Ltd. was launched in London, England.

In 1990, Sage launched its Corwin Press imprint focusing on selling books to working educators in the K-12 school market.

In 1991, Sage incorporated Sage Publications India Pvt. Ltd., in New Delhi, India.

in 2004, Blaise R. Simqu became Chief Executive Officer.

In 2006, Sage opens Sage Asia-Pacific office in Singapore with subsidiary offices in Beijing and Shanghai.

Sage acquired CQ Press in 2008, Learning Matters in 2011, Adam Matthew Digital in 2012, and Talis Education Ltd in 2018.

In 2018, Sage acquired Lean Library, a browser extension and discovery service, which then faced opposition by part of the academic community for being owned by a for-profit, as opposed to open data, open source and non-profit products like Unpaywall which facilitates usage of open access works.

In 2018, Sage reported a mean 2017 gender pay gap of 13.1% for its UK workforce, while the median was 10.3%.

In 2023, Sage acquired IOS Press.

In 2024, Sage acquired Mary Anne Liebert, Inc., Cambridge Business Publishers, and GOOD DOCS LLC.

== OASPA membership ==
Sage Publishing was a founding member of the Open Access Scholarly Publishers Association (OASPA) when it was established in 2008. In November 2013, OASPA reviewed Sage's membership after the Journal of International Medical Research accepted a false and intentionally flawed paper created and submitted by a reporter for the journal Science as part of a "sting" to test the effectiveness of the peer-review processes of open access journals. Sage's membership was reinstated at the end of the six month review period following changes to the journal's editorial processes.

== Lawsuits ==
In 2008, Sage along with two other companies, sued Georgia State University for alleged copyright infringement due to faculty providing excerpts of materials to students. The case concluded in 2020 with the publishing companies losing.

In September 2024, Lucina Uddin, a neuroscience professor at UCLA, sued Sage Publishing along with five other academic journal publishers in a proposed class-action lawsuit, alleging that the publishers violated antitrust law by agreeing not to compete against each other for manuscripts and by denying scholars payment for peer review services.

== Fraud ==
An academic fraud that impacted journals published by Sage Publishing, particularly the Journal of Vibration and Control (JVC), was uncovered in July 2014 following a 14-month internal investigation by Sage, which revealed a fake peer-review scam involving hundreds of fraudulent and assumed identities.

The scam was orchestrated mainly by Peter Chen, a physicist at the National Pingtung University of Education (NPUE) in Taiwan. Chen used fake identities and Gmail accounts to pose as university-based scientists, manipulating the peer-review process to ensure favorable reviews for submissions. The scam involved creating a network of papers where the same small group of authors reviewed each other's work and appeared together as co-authors. This practice, known as a "peer review ring," allowed Chen to publish numerous articles with minimal scrutiny. The lack of vetting and the lax editorial policy at JVC, which allowed authors to nominate preferred reviewers without adequate verification, facilitated the scam.

The discovery of the scam led to the retraction of 60 research articles published over four years in JVC. The retractions were a result of Sage's investigation, which found that the authors and reviewers involved in the scam did not respond to verification requests. The Education Minister of Taiwan, Chiang Wei-ling, was also implicated as his name appeared on several of the retracted papers, leading to his resignation. Sage subsequently claimed to have taken steps to ensure compliance with the highest standards of peer review and publication, including conducting additional reviews of their guidance to editors and authors.

== Trading name ==
Sage is a trading name of

- Sage Publications Inc,
- Sage Publications Ltd,
- Sage Publications India PVT LTD,
- Sage Publications Asia‐Pacific PTE LTD

== Acquisitions ==
Sage has acquired a number of other companies, including:

- Pion Limited, founded in 1959 by Adam Gelbtuch and John Ashby, was the publisher of four journals in the Environment and Planning series. Sage acquired Pion in May 2015.
- Global Village Publishing, which develops software and services for electronic publishing, was acquired by Sage in May 2018.
- Talis Group, an educational technology company that developed the learning management system Talis Aspire, was acquired by Sage in August 2018.
- Mary Ann Liebert, which publishes more than 100 peer-reviewed journals in biotechnology and life sciences.

== Publications ==
- Improving Schools, academic journal that covers education
- Journal of Developing Societies, academic journal that covers development
- Journal of Transport History
