= Fred Kilgour =

American librarian (1914–2006)

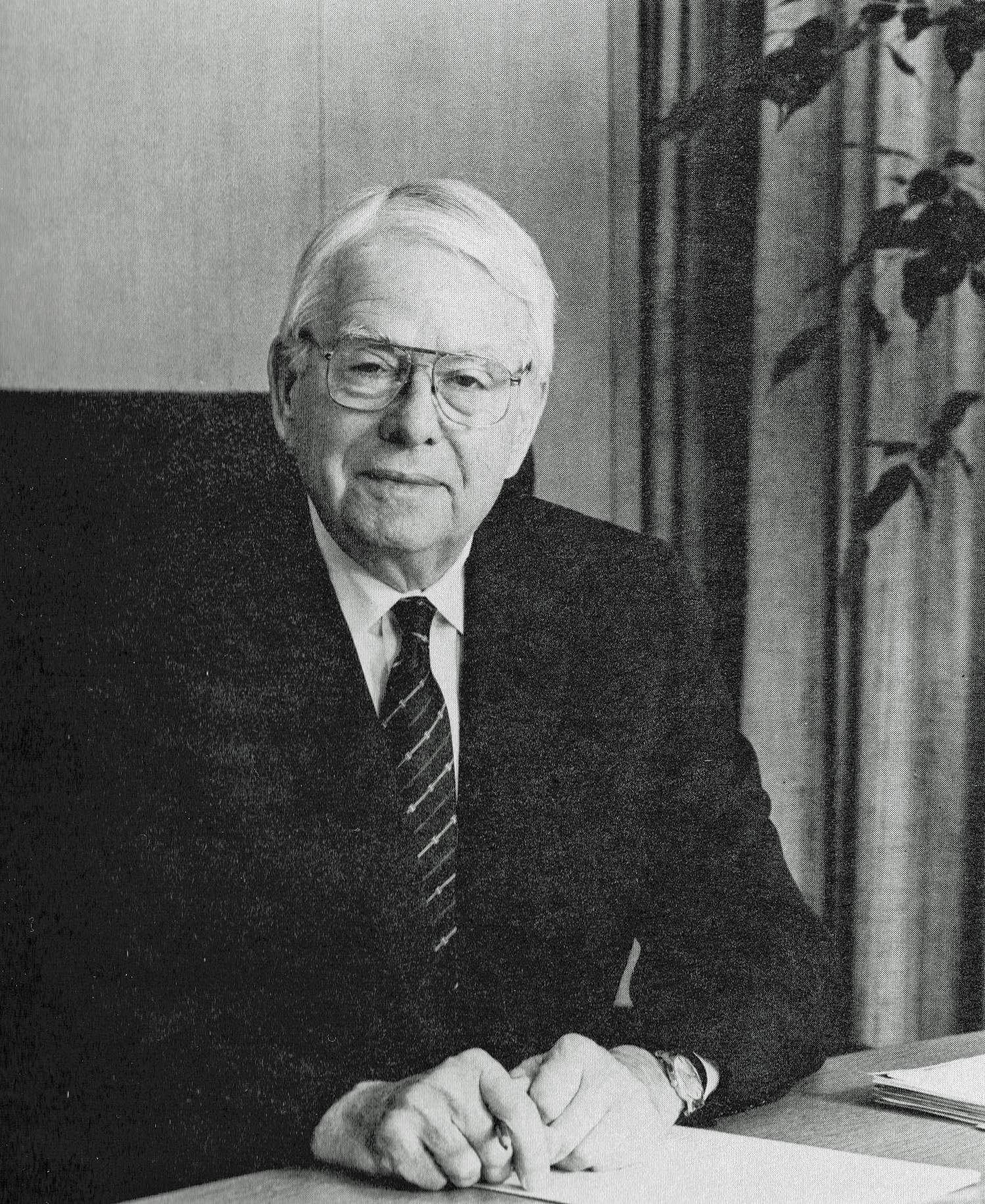
- Born: January 6, 1914; Springfield, Massachusetts, US
- Died: July 31, 2006 (aged 92); Chapel Hill, North Carolina, US
- Education: Harvard College
- Scientific career
- Fields: Library science
- Workplaces: Harvard College Library; U.S. Naval Reserve; United States Department of State; Yale Medical Library; Library and Information Technology Association; Online Computer Library Center; University of North Carolina at Chapel Hill

Frederick Gridley Kilgour (January 6, 1914 – July 31, 2006) was an American librarian and educator known as the founding director of OCLC (Online Computer Library Center), an international computer library network and database. He was its president and executive director from 1967 to 1980.

== Biography ==
Born in Springfield, Massachusetts to Edward Francis and Lillian Piper Kilgour, Kilgour earned a bachelor's degree in chemistry from Harvard College in 1935 and afterward held the position as assistant to the director of Harvard University Library.

In 1940 he married Eleanor Margaret Beach, who had graduated from Mount Holyoke College and taken a job at the Harvard College Library, where they met.

In 1942 to 1945 Kilgour served during World War II as a lieutenant in the U.S. Naval Reserve and was Executive Secretary and Acting Chairman of the U.S. government's Interdepartmental Committee for the Acquisition of Foreign Publications (IDC), which developed a system for obtaining publications from enemy and enemy-occupied areas. This organization of 150 persons in outposts around the world microfilmed newspapers and other printed information items and sent them back to Washington, DC.

An example of the kind of intelligence gathered was the Japanese "News for Sailors" reports that listed new minefields. These reports were sent from Washington, D.C. directly to Pearl Harbor and U.S. submarines in the Western Pacific. Kilgour received the Legion of Merit for his intelligence work in 1945. He worked at the United States Department of State as deputy director of the Office of Intelligence Collection and Dissemination from 1946 to 1948.

In 1948 he was named Librarian of the Yale Medical Library. At Yale he was also a lecturer in the history of science and technology and published many scholarly articles on those topics. While running the Yale University Medical Library, Kilgour began publishing studies and articles on library use and effectiveness. He asked his staff to collect empirical data, such as use of books and journals by categories of borrowers to guide selection and retention of titles. He viewed the library "not merely as a depository of knowledge," but as "an instrument of education."

At the dawn of library automation in the early 1970s, he was a member of the Library and Information Technology Association (LITA), an organization within the American Library Association, where he was president from 1973 to 1975. He joined the Ohio College Association in 1967 to develop OCLC (Online Computer Library Center) and led the creation of a library network that today links 72,000 institutions in 170 countries. It first amassed the catalogs of 54 academic libraries in Ohio, launching in 1971 and expanding to non-Ohio libraries in 1977.

Kilgour was president of OCLC from 1967 to 1980, presiding over its rapid growth from an intrastate network to an international network. In addition to creating the WorldCat database, he developed an online interlibrary loan system that libraries used to arrange nearly 10 million loans annually in 2005.

Today OCLC has a staff of 1,200 and offices in seven countries. Its mission remains the same: to further access to the world's information and reduce library costs. In 1981 Kilgour stepped down from management but continued to serve on the OCLC Board of Trustees until 1995.

He was a distinguished research professor emeritus at the University of North Carolina at Chapel Hill's School of Information and Library Science. He taught there from 1990, retiring in 2004.

When he died in 2006 he was 92 years old and had lived since 1990 in Chapel Hill, North Carolina. He was survived by his wife and their daughters, Marta Kilgour and Vajra Alison Kilgour of New York City, and Meredith Kilgour Perdiew of North Edison, New Jersey; and two grandchildren and five great-grandchildren.

== OCLC ==
Based in Dublin, Ohio, OCLC and its member libraries cooperatively produce and maintain WorldCat—the OCLC Online Union Catalog, the largest OPAC in the world. Under Kilgour's leadership, the nonprofit corporation introduced a shared cataloging system in 1971 for 54 Ohio academic libraries. WorldCat contains holding records from most public and private libraries worldwide. WorldCat is available through many libraries and university computer networks.

In 1971, after four years of development, OCLC introduced its online shared cataloging system, which would achieve dramatic cost savings for libraries. For example, in the first year of system use, the Alden Library at Ohio University was able to increase the number of books it cataloged by a third, while reducing its staff by 17 positions. Word of this new idea spread on campuses across the country, starting an online revolution in libraries that continues to this day.

The shared cataloging system and database that Kilgour devised made it unnecessary for more than one library to originally catalog an item. Libraries would either use the cataloging information that already existed in the database, or they would put it in for other libraries to use. The shared catalog also provided information about materials in libraries in the rest of the network. For the first time, a user in one library could easily find out what was held in another library. The network quickly grew outside Ohio to all 50 states and then overseas.

Because of his contributions to librarianship, OCLC and LITA, jointly sponsors an award named after Kilgour. Inaugurated in 1998 and awarded annually, it highlights research on information technology with a focus on "work that "shows the promise of having a positive and substantive impact on any aspect of the publication, storage, retrieval, and dissemination of information, or the processes by which information and data are manipulated and managed."

== Legacy ==
Kilgour is widely recognized as one of the leading figures in 20th century librarianship for his work in using computer networks to increase access to information in libraries around the world. He was among the earliest proponents of adapting computer technology to library processes.

The database that Kilgour created, now called WorldCat, is regarded as the world's largest computerized library catalog, including not only entries from large institutions such as the Library of Congress, the British Library, the Russian State Library and Singapore, but also from small public libraries, art museums and historical societies. It contains descriptions of library materials and their locations. More recently, the database provides access to the electronic full text of articles, books as well as images and sound recordings. It spans 4,000 years of recorded knowledge. It contains more than 70 million records and one billion location listings. Every 10 seconds a library adds a new record. It is available on the World Wide Web.

Inspired by Ralph H. Parker's 1936 work using punched cards for library automation, Kilgour soon began experimenting in automating library procedures at the Harvard University Library, primarily with the use of punched cards for a circulation system. He also studied under George Sarton, a pioneer in the new discipline of the history of science, and began publishing scholarly papers. He also launched a project to build a collection of microfilmed foreign newspapers to help scholars have access to newspapers from abroad. This activity quickly came to the attention of government officials in Washington, D.C.

In 1961 he was one of the leaders in the development of a prototype computerized library catalog system for the medical libraries at Columbia, Harvard and Yale Universities that was funded by the National Science Foundation. In 1965, Kilgour was named associate librarian for research and development at Yale University. He continued to conduct experiments in library automation and to promote their potential benefits in the professional literature.

In his professional writings Kilgour was one of the earliest proponents of applying computerization to librarianship. He pointed out that the explosion of research information was placing new demands on libraries to furnish information completely and rapidly. He advocated the use of the computer to eliminate human repetitive tasks from library procedures, such as catalog card production. He recognized nearly 40 years ago the potential of linking libraries in computer networks to create economies of scale and generate "network effects" that would increase the value of the network as more participants were added.

OCLC has demonstrated the feasibility of sharing of catalog-record creation and has helped libraries to maintain and to enhance the quality and speed of service while achieving cost control—and even cost reduction—in the face of severely reduced funding. His work has a lasting impact on the field of information science.

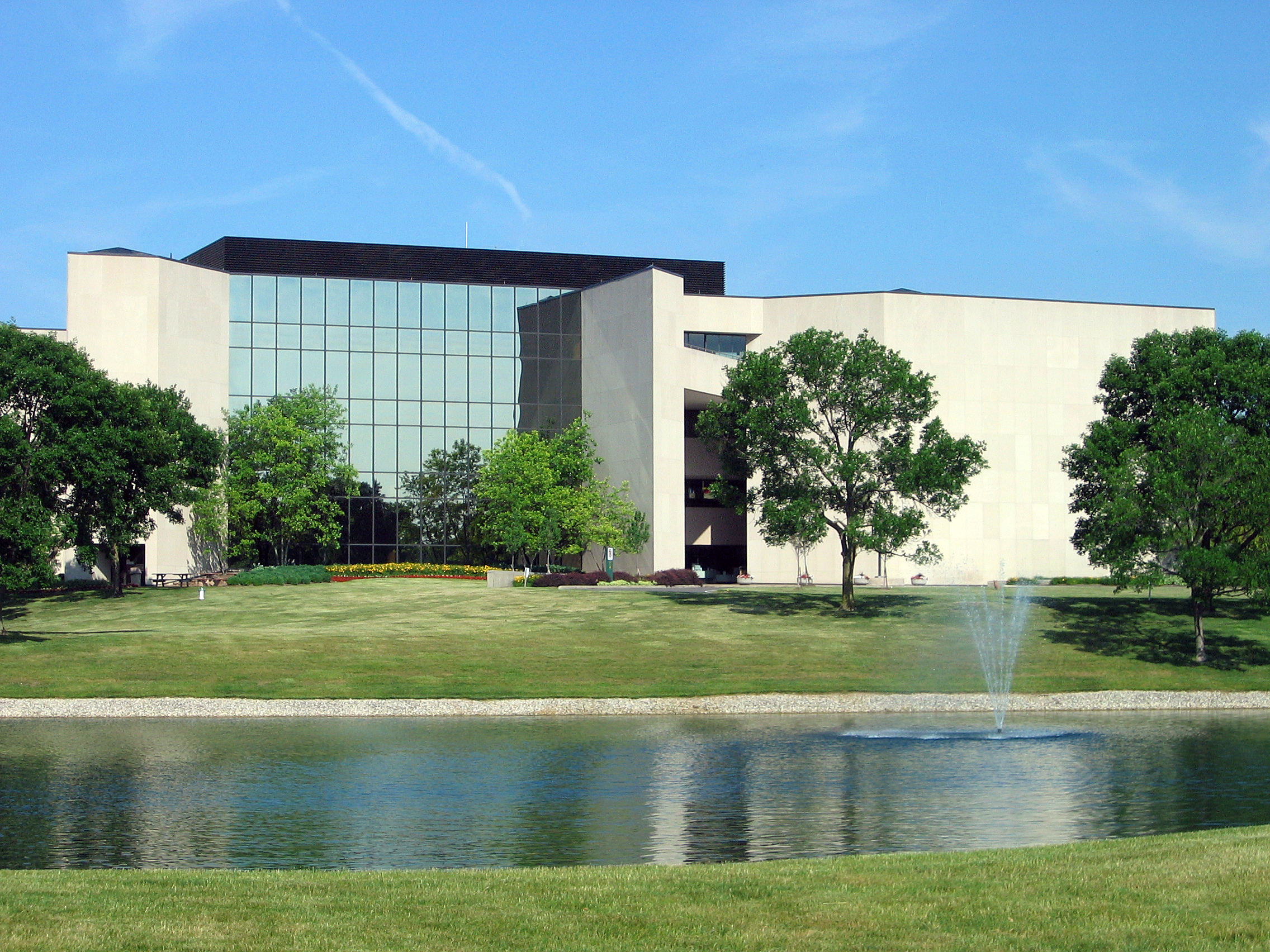
Kilgour Building, OCLC Main Campus, Dublin, Ohio

The main office building on the OCLC campus is named after Kilgour. The main entrance road to the OCLC campus is named Kilgour Place.

OCLC created an annual award in Kilgour's name, the Kilgour Award, which is given to a researcher who has contributed to advances information science.

== Awards ==
In 1990 Kilgour was named Distinguished Research Professor of the School of Information and Library Science, the University of North Carolina at Chapel Hill, and served on the faculty until his retirement in 2004.

Kilgour was the author of 205 scholarly papers. He was the founder and first editor of the journal, Information Technology and Libraries. In 1999, Oxford University Press published his book The Evolution of the Book. His other books include The Library of the Medical Institution of Yale College and its Catalogue of 1865 and The Library and Information Science CumIndex.

He received numerous awards from library associations and five honorary doctorates. In 1978 he was honored with the Melvil Dewey Medal by the American Library Association and in 1982, the Association presented him with American Library Association Honorary Membership

In recognition of his successful pioneering efforts to master technology in the service of librarianship; the acuity of his vision that helped to introduce the most modern and powerful technologies into the practice of librarianship; the establishment and development of a practical vehicle for making the benefits of technology readily available to thousands of libraries; his long and distinguished career as a practicing librarian; his voluminous, scholarly and prophetic writings; and above all his fostering the means for ensuring the economic viability of libraries, the American Library Association hereby cites Frederick Gridley Kilgour as scholar, entrepreneur, innovator, and interpreter of technology steadfastly committed to the preservation of humanistic values.

In 1979 the American Society for Information Science and Technology gave him the Award of Merit. The citation read:

Presented to Frederick G. Kilgour, in recognition of his leadership in the field of library automation: As Executive Director of OCLC since 1967 he has succeeded in changing the conception of what is feasible in library automation and library networking. His major technological developments, superb planning and executive abilities, deep insight into bibliographic and information needs, and unfaltering leadership have transformed a state association of libraries into a national interlibrary bibliographic utility.

== Works ==
- Kilgour F. G. (2004). "An experiment using coordinate title word searches. Journal of the American Society for Information Science and Technology 74–80.
- Frederick G. Kilgour: The Evolution of the Book, (New York: Oxford University Press, 1998) ISBN 978-0-19-511859-9
- Kilgour Frederick G. 1985. Beyond Bibliography. London: British Library.
- Kilgour Frederick G. 1975. The Library and Information Science Cumindex. Los Altos Calif: R & D Press.
- Kilgour F. G. (1979). The impact of AACR 2 on the economic viability of libraries. O.C.L.C.
- Kilgour F. G. Drexel Conference on Data Processing in University Libraries Kilgour F. G. & Drexel Institute of Technology Graduate School of Library Science. (1967). Computers for university libraries. Drexel Press: Graduate School of Library Science Drexel Institute of Technology.
- Kilgour F. G. & Yale Medical Library. (1965). Computer applications in biomedical libraries. Yale Medical Library.
