= OAIster =

- Producer: OCLC (United States)
- History: June 28, 2002–present

Access
- Cost: Free

Coverage
- Record depth: Index & full-text

Links
- Website: oaister.worldcat.org

OAIster is an online combined bibliographic catalogue of open access material aggregated using OAI-PMH.

It began at the University of Michigan in 2002 funded by a grant from the Andrew W. Mellon Foundation and with the purpose of establishing a retrieval service for publicly available digital library resources provided by the research library community. During its tenure at the University of Michigan, OAIster grew to become one of the largest aggregations of records pointing to open access collections in the world.

In 2009, OCLC formed a partnership with the University of Michigan to provide continued access to open access collections aggregated in OAIster. Since OCLC began managing OAIster, it has grown to include over 30 million records contributed by over 1,500 organizations. OCLC is evolving OAIster to a model of self-service contribution for all open access digital repositories to ensure the long-term sustainability of this rich collection of open access materials.

OAIster data is harvested from Open Archives Initiative (OAI)-compliant digital libraries, institutional repositories, and online journals using the self-service WorldCat Digital Collection Gateway.

== Access ==
OAIster.worldcat.org is a freely accessible OCLC site for searching the millions of OAIster records alone. The records will continue to be indexed in OCLC's WorldCat, and will be integrated in WorldCat.org search results along with records from thousands of libraries worldwide. They also will continue to be included in WorldCat Local and WorldCat Local "quick start" search results, and will continue to be available via other OCLC Discovery services.

== See also ==
- List of academic databases and search engines
