= Talis Group =

UK software company

Talis Group Ltd.
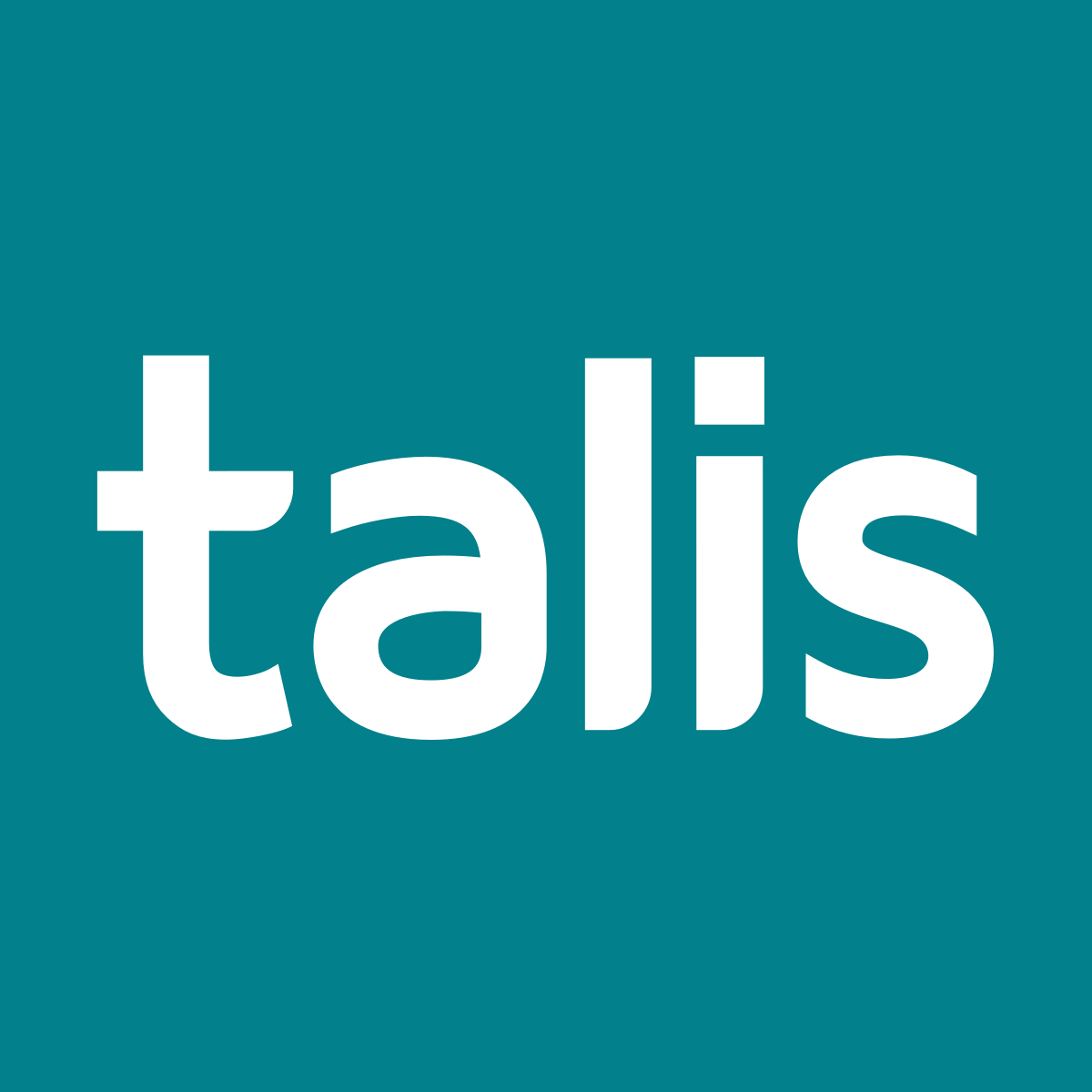
- Type: Private
- Industry: Computer software
- Founded: 1969
- Headquarters: Birmingham, England
- Area served: Worldwide
- Key people: Dave Errington, CEO; Justin Leavesley, CSO; Tom Hawkins, CFO; Chris Clarke, CTO
- Parent: SAGE Publications
- Website: talis.com

Talis Group Ltd. is a software company based in Birmingham, England, that develops software for higher education. They were previously involved in development of library management software and a Semantic Web application platform. In 2005 Talis was voted one of the top ICT Employers in the United Kingdom.

== History ==
In 1969 a number of libraries founded a small co-operative project, based in Birmingham, to provide services that would help the libraries become more efficient. The project was known as the Birmingham Libraries Co-operative Mechanisation Project, or BLCMP, and included the library of the University of Birmingham. At this time the concept of library automation was so new that the term mechanisation was often used in its place.

BLCMP began a co-operative catalogue of bibliographic data at the start of its work, a database that now contains many millions of records. For this an adaptation of UKMARC coding was used. This shared approach to creating metadata is the forefather of later, Internet-based, community ventures such as IMDb, Freebase and others. But this was back in 1969 when shipping this data around involved printing cards and putting boxes on trucks. More libraries became members of BLCMP, e.g. many of the academic libraries of Manchester and Salford.

BLCMP moved into using microfiche and later IBM mainframes with dedicated terminals at libraries in the mid-seventies and was one of the first library automation vendors to provide a GUI on top of Microsoft Windows to provide a better interface for end-users. The integrated library system (ILS) was first called Talis after 'The Automated Library And Information System'. Talis became the name of the company during re-structuring and the ILS became known as Alto. In 1995 Talis was the first library systems vendor to produce a web-enabled public access catalogue. The library of the University of Sheffield became the 50th customer to choose the Talis library system in 1996.

During the first decade of the 3rd millennium, much of Talis's work focused on the transition of information to the web, specifically the Semantic Web, and Talis has led much of the debate about how Web 2.0 attitudes affect traditional libraries. Alongside semantic web developments Talis launched Talis Education Ltd, a business focused on products in Higher Education learning, and Kasabi, a data marketplace.

In March 2011 Talis sold its library management division to Capita Group. The division was sold for a reported £18.5 million plus a further £2.5 million depending on the company's profitability in the following financial year. The company moved its headquarters from Solihull to central Birmingham.

Following the sale of its library management business Talis experimented with a semantic web and data marketplace business alongside the rapidly establishing education business. A tough economic climate required Talis to focus its investment, therefore they announced in July 2012 that investment in the semantic web and data marketplace areas would cease. All efforts are now concentrated on the education business.

Talis Aspire, the company's enterprise teaching and learning platform, is now in use by over 1 million students at 93 universities across 8 countries, including over 65% of all UK universities.

Talis Education Ltd was acquired by SAGE Publications in 2018.

As of 2023, Talis Aspire has effectively become the global market leader in reading list software.

Technology from Sage was launched in 2021 as a division of Sage bringing together its library technology products, including Lean Library. Later Talis was added to this group.

In 2022, the division expanded with the acquisition of Sciwheel.

In 2025, Sage divested its technology division. Talis was acquired by Kortext, while Lean Library was sold to a management group and became a separate company.

Following these changes, Technology from Sage stated that "Lean Library is now a separate company" and that "Talis is now part of Kortext".

== See also ==
- Copac
- Library 2.0
- SUNCAT
