= Library Hub Discover =

Union catalog operated by Jisc

Library Hub Discover is a union catalogue operated by Jisc (jisc.ac.uk). It replaces Copac and SUNCAT. Its user interface is centred around a simple search engine-like query box.
