= KVK-Tech =

American pharmaceutical company

KVK-Tech, Inc.
- Company type: Private
- Industry: Pharmaceutical manufacturing
- Founded: 2004
- Founder: Murty Vepuri
- Headquarters: Newtown, Pennsylvania, United States
- Key people: Anthony Tabasso (CEO)
- Products: Generic drugs
- Website: kvktech.com

KVK-Tech, Inc. is an American generic drug manufacturer headquartered in Newtown, Pennsylvania.

== History ==
KVK-Tech was founded in 2004 by Murty Vepuri, who previously operated Able Laboratories in New Jersey. Between 2006 and 2012, KVK-Tech was among the largest manufacturers of generic opioid medications in the United States, producing 580 million pills.

In March 2015, KVK-Tech purchased a 52-acre former Lockheed Martin corporate campus in Newtown Township for $12.5 million.

In September 2016, the FDA approved the company's first branded product, KVK-Tech's Lomaira (phentermine) 8mg tablets for weight reduction.

As of 2022, KVK-Tech operates multiple facilities in Pennsylvania, including its headquarters at 110 Terry Drive in Newtown Township, the former Lockheed Martin campus at 100 Campus Drive in Newtown Township, and a manufacturing facility in Falls Township.

In 2023, KVK-Tech entered into strategic partnerships with Sen-Jam Pharmaceutical for the development, manufacturing, and distribution of pharmaceutical products.

== Community programs ==
Since 2017, KVK-Tech has partnered with the Council Rock School District in Bucks County, Pennsylvania, to support STEM education programs.

== Regulatory issues and recalls ==
=== FDA warning letters ===
In February 2020, the FDA issued a warning letter to KVK-Tech's headquarters facility after an April 2019 inspection found violations of current good manufacturing practices (cGMP), including impurity levels and foreign objects in medication lots.

In October 2020, the FDA issued a second warning letter to KVK-Tech's facility at the former Lockheed Martin campus after a February-March 2020 inspection identified additional cGMP violations, including inadequate cleaning validation procedures.

=== Product recalls ===
In July 2021, KVK-Tech issued a voluntary nationwide recall of one lot of betaxolol tablets after a single foreign tablet was discovered during line clearance after packaging.

In August 2021, the company recalled two lots of atovaquone oral suspension used to treat Pneumocystis pneumonia in HIV/AIDS patients due to a temperature control issue during shipping.

In October 2023, KVK-Tech recalled a batch of losartan potassium/hydrochlorothiazide tablets after an oxycodone tablet was found in a bottle of the blood pressure medication.

=== Criminal charges ===
In June 2021, the United States Department of Justice charged KVK-Tech, Murty Vepuri, and quality assurance director Ashvin Panchal with conspiracy to defraud the FDA. The indictment alleged that from October 2010 through March 2015, the company distributed more than 383,000 bottles of hydroxyzine, an anxiety medication, using an unapproved active pharmaceutical ingredient (API) from a Dr. Reddy's Laboratories facility in Mexico that was under an FDA import alert due to manufacturing violations.

In 2022, U.S. District Judge Harvey Bartle III dismissed part of the charges, ruling that the use of the Mexican manufacturing location did not constitute distributing a new drug, as the API had the same chemical composition as approved sources.

In July 2021, federal agents conducted searches at KVK-Tech facilities in Newtown and Falls Township, seizing 30 terabytes of digital information and 500 boxes of company records.
