= SUNCAT =

Catalog of serial holdings in the UK

Library cataloging and classification

The Serials Union Catalogue, or SUNCAT, was a freely available source of information about serials holdings in the United Kingdom, for the UK research community.

For both electronic and print serials, including academic journals, periodicals, newspapers, newsletters, magazines etc. SUNCAT contained data from over 90 UK research libraries, including the British Library and the National Libraries of Scotland and Wales.

SUNCAT was an EDINA service, and was funded by Jisc. It ran on Ex Libris' Aleph 500 Library Management System.

On 31 July 2019, SUNCAT, Copac, CCM Tools and the RLUK database were dismissed and replaced by three new services: Library Hub Discover, Library Hub Compare, and Library Hub Cataloguing.

== See also ==
- Copac
- Library Hub Discover
- RLUK
- Talis Group
