= Library linked data =

The use of linked data by libraries

Library linked data (LLD) is the use of linked data standards by libraries. These standards are usually applied to bibliographic and authority data sets, with the hope of decreasing redundant cataloging work; and increasing visibility of library resources and interoperability with non-library systems.

== Use cases ==
In 2010, Byrne and Goddard have written that the "killer [library linked data] example isn't out there yet," and warned that implementation work will be hampered if clear use cases don't exist.

Many groups have examined this issue, including the W3C Library Linked Data Incubator Group, the Bibliographic Framework Initiative, and the LD4L project.

== Conferences ==
- The Hochschulbibliothekszentrum des Landes Nordrhein-Westfalen and the German National Library of Economics sponsor the annual international Semantic Web in Libraries (SWIB) conference

== See also ==
- BIBFRAME
- Library of Congress Linked Data Service (LC LDS)
- Resource Description and Access and RDA vocabularies
- Universal Bibliographic Control
