= Research Libraries UK =

Organisation of libraries in the UK and Ireland

Research Libraries UK (RLUK) (formerly CURL) comprises 35 university libraries, 3 national libraries, and the Wellcome Collection in the United Kingdom and Ireland. Its aim is to increase the ability of research libraries to share resources among themselves. The holdings of these libraries provided the basis of the Copac online catalogue.

The Consortium of University Research Libraries (CURL) started in 1983 as an informal grouping of the seven largest university research libraries (the university libraries of Cambridge, Edinburgh, Glasgow, Leeds, London, Manchester, and Oxford) to "explore the possibilities of closer co-operation, particularly, but not exclusively in the use of automation". The consortium was incorporated as a company limited by guarantee in 1992. By April 1997 the number of full members had increased to 20, including Trinity College Dublin in the Republic of Ireland, and the three national libraries of the UK and the Wellcome Institute for the History of Medicine had been admitted as associate members. The increased size of the organisation led to the appointment of the first full-time executive secretary in 1997.

In 2011, Queen's University Belfast joined as RLUK's 30th member, meaning that all 20 then-members of the Russell Group of universities were now members. Of the four universities that joined the Russell Group in 2012, Durham and York were already members of RLUK, having joined in 1996 and 2011 respectively, while Exeter and Queen Mary, University of London joined in 2012 and 2014.

== RLUK members ==
Members as of March 2023 are:

- Sir Duncan Rice Library, University of Aberdeen (website)
- University of Birmingham Library Services (website)
- University of Bristol Library (website)
- British Library (website)
- Cambridge University Library (website)
- Cardiff University Information Services (website)
- Durham University Library (website)
- University of Edinburgh Information Services (website)
- University of Exeter Library (website)
- University of Glasgow Library (website)
- Abdus Salam Library, Imperial College London (website)
- Maughan Library, King's College London (website)
- Lancaster University Library (website)
- University of Leeds Library (website)
- University of Leicester Library (website)
- University of Liverpool Library (website)
- Senate House Libraries, University of London (website)
- British Library of Political and Economic Science, London School of Economics (website)
- University of Manchester Library (website)
- National Library of Scotland (website)
- National Library of Wales (website)
- Newcastle University Library (website)
- University of Nottingham Library (website)
- Bodleian Libraries, University of Oxford (website)
- Queen Mary, University of London Library (website)
- Queen's University Belfast Information Services (website)
- University of Reading Library (website)
- Royal Holloway, University of London Library (website)
- SOAS University of London Library (website)
- University of Sheffield Library (website)
- University of Southampton Library (website)
- University of St Andrews Library (website)
- University of Sussex Library (website)
- Trinity College Dublin Library (website)
- University of East Anglia Library (website)
- University College London Library Services (website)
- University of Warwick Library (website)
- Wellcome Library (website)
- University of York Library (website)

== See also ==
- Copac, provided by Research Libraries UK
- Library and Archives Canada
- WorldCat
