= Karlsruher Virtueller Katalog =

Library catalog

The Karlsruhe Virtual Catalog (German: Karlsruher Virtueller Katalog, KVK) is a book search engine administered by the library of the Karlsruhe Institute of Technology. It was developed by KIT-Library in 1996 and continuously expanded and adapted since. It searches a large number of catalogs of research libraries and consortia in Germany, Austria, and Switzerland, as well as important consortia and national library catalogs in other countries. Beyond that it also searches open access and digital media search engines and catalogs. It is said to encompass more than 600 million books and serial publications.

== Technology ==
In order to be able to search many catalogs at the same time, the KVK team has created a CGI program, which initially reformulates the terms entered in the KVK search form for each of the target catalogs according to their requirements. For each WWW search interface of the target catalogs, a structure description file is provided which allows entry into the CGI program. The structure description file describes the structure of the respective search form and the structure of the resulting hit lists. Important information about the search form is the names of the WWW server, the search fields, and the CGI program of the target catalog that performs the search. The CGI program of the KVK then transfers the search queries in the KVK in the correct syntax to the correct fields of the target catalog. Important elements of the hit list are the short titles of the hits and the URL links to the full title dis.
