= EZproxy =

Web proxy server used by libraries to give remote access to subscription resources

EZproxy is a web proxy server used by libraries to give access from outside the library's computer network to restricted-access websites that authenticate users by IP address. This allows library patrons at home or elsewhere to log in through their library's EZproxy server and gain access to resources to which their library subscribes, such as bibliographic databases.

The software was originally written by Chris Zagar in 1999 who founded Useful Utilities LLC to support it. OCLC announced in January 2008 that it had acquired the product and was hiring Zagar as a full-time consultant for a year. Zagar is a librarian who serves as a systems librarian at the Estrella Mountain Community College, a part of the Maricopa Community Colleges in Arizona. He won the 2006 LITA/Brett Butler Entrepreneurship Award for his work with EZproxy.

EZproxy is a URL rewriting program, which works by dynamically altering the URLs within the web pages provided by the database vendor. The server names within the URLs of these web pages are changed to reflect the EZproxy server instead, causing users to return to the EZproxy server as they access links on these web pages." Previous proxy solutions were complex and difficult to maintain, and when EZproxy was created, authentication systems like Shibboleth were still far in the future.

The software is sometimes confused with generic proxy server software designed to control web access. It is sometimes referred to as a "proxy referral" server to distinguish it.

The software has been purchased by thousands of institutions in over 100 countries.
