= WorldCat =

International union library catalog

- Screenshot WorldCat homepage as of June 2019
- Website type: Network of library content and services
- Available in: 13 languages
- List of languages: Chinese (Simplified); Chinese (Traditional); Czech; Dutch; English; French; German; Italian; Korean; Japanese; Portuguese; Spanish; Thai; Urdu
- Owner: OCLC
- Website: search.worldcat.org
- Commercial: No
- Registration: Optional, but some features require registration (such as writing reviews and making lists or bibliographies)
- Launched: January 21, 1998; 28 years ago (date of registry of the new domain name; the database has existed since 1971)
- Current status: Online
- OCLC number: 756372754

WorldCat is a union catalog that itemizes the collections of tens of thousands of institutions (mostly libraries), in many countries, that are current or past members of the OCLC global cooperative. It is operated by OCLC, Inc. Many of the OCLC member libraries collectively maintain WorldCat's database, the world's largest bibliographic database. The database includes other information sources in addition to member library collections. OCLC makes WorldCat itself available free to libraries, but the catalog is the foundation for other subscription OCLC services (such as resource sharing and collection management). WorldCat is used by librarians for cataloging and research and by the general public.

As of December 2021, WorldCat contained over 540 million bibliographic records in 483 languages, representing over 3 billion physical and digital library assets, and the WorldCat persons dataset (mined from WorldCat) included over 100 million people.

== History ==
OCLC was founded in 1967 under the leadership of Fred Kilgour. That same year, OCLC began to develop the union catalog technology that would later evolve into WorldCat; the first catalog records were added in 1971.

In 2003, OCLC began the "Open WorldCat" pilot program, making abbreviated records from a subset of WorldCat available to partner web sites and booksellers, to increase the accessibility of its subscribing member libraries' collections.

In October 2005, the OCLC technical staff began a wiki project, WikiD, allowing readers to add commentary and structured-field information associated with any WorldCat record. WikiD was later phased out, although WorldCat later incorporated user-generated content in other ways.

In 2006, it became possible for anyone to search WorldCat directly at its open website WorldCat.org, not only through the subscription FirstSearch interface where it had been available on the web to subscribing libraries for more than a decade before. Options for more sophisticated searches of WorldCat have remained available through the FirstSearch interface.

In 2007, WorldCat Identities began providing pages for 20 million "identities", which are metadata about names—predominantly authors and persons who are the subjects of published titles.

In 2017, OCLC's WorldCat Search API was integrated into the cite tool of Wikipedia's VisualEditor, allowing Wikipedia editors to cite sources from WorldCat easily.

Beginning in 2017, OCLC and the Internet Archive have collaborated to make the Internet Archive's records of digitized books available in WorldCat.

In May 2022, OCLC announced WorldCat Entities, a new infrastructure for library linked data. Maintenance of WorldCat Identities was suspended and the service will be discontinued as it is being replaced by WorldCat Entities.

In August 2022, OCLC launched a "redesigned and reimagined" WorldCat.org website with the stated goal "to offer greater accessibility to the collections". The website now requires the use of JavaScript and is therefore no longer accessible for users of older web browsers or those that have JavaScript disabled for security reasons. The update also removed users' book reviews and replaced them with reviews from Amazon subsidiary GoodReads.

In 2023, Anna's Archive scraped and began distributing the whole WorldCat database and was subsequently sued by OCLC in January 2024 (see Anna's Archive § OCLC lawsuit).

== System architecture ==
Local catalogs of many OCLC member libraries are intermittently synchronized with the WorldCat database. WorldCat allows participating institutions to add direct links from WorldCat to their own local catalog entries for particular items, which enables the user to click through to the local catalog to quickly determine an item's real-time status (for example, whether or not it is checked out).

In a small percentage of libraries, the local catalog is also run by OCLC using an integrated library system called WorldCat Discovery and WorldShare Management Services.

Library contributions to WorldCat are made via the Connexion computer program, which was introduced in 2001; its predecessor, OCLC Passport, was phased out in May 2005. Cataloging librarians may also use the WorldShare Record Manager or WorldCat Metadata API for similar purposes.

== See also ==
- Faceted Application of Subject Terminology (FAST) – developed as part of WorldCat
- Library Hub Discover
- List of academic databases and search engines
- Open Library
