= Character encodings in HTML =

Use of encoding systems for international characters in HTML

While Hypertext Markup Language (HTML) has been in use since 1991, HTML 4.0 from December 1997 was the first standardized version where international characters were given reasonably complete treatment. When an HTML document includes special characters outside the range of seven-bit ASCII, two goals are worth considering: the information's integrity, and universal browser display.

In version 5.3 of the now retired W3C specification, and the current Living Standard published by WHATWG, the only valid encoding is UTF-8.

== Specifying the document's character encoding ==
There are two general ways to specify which character encoding is used in the document.

First, the web server can include the character encoding or "charset" in the Hypertext Transfer Protocol (HTTP) Content-Type header, which would typically look like this:

Content-Type: text/html; charset=utf-8

This method gives the HTTP server a convenient way to alter document's encoding according to content negotiation; certain HTTP server software can do it, for example Apache with the module mod_charset_lite.

Second, a declaration can be included within the document itself.

For HTML it is possible to include this information inside the head element near the top of the document:

<meta http-equiv="Content-Type" content="text/html; charset=utf-8">

HTML5 also allows the following syntax to mean exactly the same:

<meta charset="utf-8">

XHTML documents have a third option: to express the character encoding via XML declaration, as follows:

<?xml version="1.0" encoding="utf-8"?>

With this second approach, because the character encoding cannot be known until the declaration is parsed, there is a problem knowing which character encoding is used in the document up to and including the declaration itself. If the character encoding is an ASCII extension then the content up to and including the declaration itself should be pure ASCII and this will work correctly. For character encodings that are not ASCII extensions (i.e. not a superset of ASCII), such as UTF-16BE and UTF-16LE, a processor of HTML, such as a web browser, should be able to parse the declaration in some cases through the use of heuristics.

Although HTML written to the current Living Standard is required to be UTF-8, an encoding declaration, in any of the above forms, is nonetheless required. It must be a case-insensitive match for the string "utf-8" and the document must, in fact, be in UTF-8.

=== Encoding detection algorithm ===
An "encoding sniffing algorithm" is defined in the specification to determine the character encoding of the document based on multiple sources of input, including:

1. Explicit user instruction
2. An explicit meta tag within the first 1024 bytes of the document
3. A byte order mark (BOM) within the first three bytes of the document
4. The HTTP Content-Type or other transport layer information
5. Analysis of the document bytes looking for specific sequences or ranges of byte values, and other tentative detection mechanisms.

Characters outside of the printable ASCII range (32 to 126) may appear incorrectly if the document is served with an incorrect character encoding. This presents few problems for English-speaking users, but other languages regularly—in some cases, always—require characters outside that range. In Chinese, Japanese, and Korean (CJK) language environments where there are several different multi-byte encodings in use, auto-detection is also often employed. Finally, browsers usually permit the user to override incorrect charset label manually as well.

UTF-8 has been the most common character encoding on the Web since 2008, in part because, as an encoding of Unicode, it allows use of the same encoding for all languages. As of January 2026, UTF-8 is used by 98.9% of web sites surveyed by W3Techs. UTF-16 or UTF-32, other encodings of Unicode, are less widely used because they can be harder to handle in programming languages that assume a byte-oriented ASCII superset encoding, and they are less efficient for text with a high frequency of ASCII characters, which is usually the case for HTML documents.

Successful viewing of a page is not necessarily an indication that its encoding is specified correctly. If the page's creator and reader are both assuming some platform-specific character encoding, and the server does not send any identifying information, then the reader will nonetheless see the page as the creator intended, but other readers on different platforms or with different native languages will not see the page as intended.

== Permitted encodings ==
Version 5.3 of the retired W3C standard and the current (as of 2026) WHATWG Living Standard both require UTF-8. No other encoding is considered valid. Nonetheless, implementations must use the encoding sniffing algorithm to determine which encoding to apply to the document, in accordance with the robustness principle.

The WHATWG Encoding Standard, referenced by both standards, specifies a list of encodings which browsers must support. The HTML standards forbid support of other encodings. The Encoding Standard further stipulates that new formats, new protocols (even when existing formats are used) and authors of new documents are required to use UTF-8 exclusively.

Besides UTF-8, the following encodings are explicitly listed in the HTML standard itself, with reference to the Encoding Standard:

- ISO-8859-2
- ISO-8859-7 (Note: Omitted from W3C version 5.3.)
- ISO-8859-8
- Windows-874 (Note: Also specified for TIS-620, ISO-8859-11 and related labels.)
- Windows-1250
- Windows-1251
- Windows-1252 (Note: Also specified for ASCII, ISO-8859-1 and related labels.)
- Windows-1254 (Note: Also specified for ISO-8859-9 and related labels.)
- Windows-1255
- Windows-1256
- Windows-1257
- Windows-1258
- GB 18030 (Note: Specified with 0xA3A0 as a duplicate encoding of the ideographic space (U+3000) for compatibility reasons, and as such excluding U+E5E5 (a private use character). Also, specified with 0x80 accepted as an alternative encoding of the euro sign (U+20AC; see Windows-936). Otherwise, follows the mappings from the 2005 standard.)
- Big5 (Note: Hong Kong Supplementary Character Set variant, although most of the HKSCS extensions (those with lead bytes less than 0xA1) are not included by the encoder, only by the decoder.)
- Shift_JIS (Note: The specification includes IBM and NEC extensions, and is more precisely Windows-31J.)
- ISO-2022-JP (Note: The specification uses the same index as used for Shift JIS (insofar as is within reach), i.e. includes NEC extensions. Half-width kana is converted to fullwidth by the encoder, but accepted using an escape sequence (ESC 0x28 0x49) by the decoder. Shift Out and Shift In (0x0E and 0x0F) are excluded entirely to prevent attacks.)
- EUC-KR (Note: Actually Unified Hangul Code (Windows-949), which is a superset which covers the entire Hangul Syllables block.)
- UTF-16BE (Note: Specified for decoding only; form submissions from UTF-16-coded documents are to be encoded in UTF-8.)
- UTF-16LE (Note: For compatibility with deployed content, also specified for the plain UTF-16 label, although a byte order mark (BOM), if present, takes priority over any label. Specified for decoding only; form submissions from UTF-16-coded documents are to be encoded in UTF-8.)
- x-user-defined (Note: Maps 0x00 through 0x7F to U+0000 through U+007F, and 0x80 through 0xFF to U+F780 through U+F7FF (a Private Use Area range), such that the low 8 bits of the code point always match the original byte.)

The following additional encodings are listed in the Encoding Standard, and support for them is therefore also required:

- Code page 866
- ISO-8859-3
- ISO-8859-4
- ISO-8859-5
- ISO-8859-6
- ISO-8859-8-I (Note: Uses the same encoder and decoder as ISO-8859-8, but is not subject to the visual-order behaviour which is used for documents labelled as ISO-8859-8.)
- ISO-8859-10
- ISO-8859-13
- ISO-8859-14
- ISO-8859-15
- ISO-8859-16
- KOI8-R
- KOI8-U / KOI8-RU (Note: Titled KOI8-U and specified for both KOI8-U and KOI8-RU labels; follows KOI8-RU in positions 0xAE and 0xBE (i.e. includes Ў/ў) but KOI8-U in positions 0x93–9F.)
- Mac OS Roman
- Windows-1253
- Mac OS Cyrillic
- GBK (Note: Also specified for GB2312 and related labels. Handled the same as GB 18030 for decoding purposes. For encoding purposes, labelling as GBK (or GB 2312) excludes four-byte codes, and favours the one-byte 0x80 representation for U+20AC.)
- EUC-JP (Note: The specification uses the same index as used for Shift JIS (insofar as is within reach of the EUC code set 1), i.e. includes NEC extensions. JIS X 0212 is included for decoding only.)

The following encodings are listed as explicit examples of forbidden encodings:

- CESU-8
- UTF-7
- BOCU-1
- SCSU
- EBCDIC
- UTF-32

The standard also defines a "replacement" decoder, which maps all content labelled as certain encodings to the replacement character (�), refusing to process it at all. This is intended to prevent attacks (e.g. cross site scripting) which may exploit a difference between the client and server in what encodings are supported in order to mask malicious content. Although the same security concern applies to ISO-2022-JP and UTF-16, which also allow sequences of ASCII bytes to be interpreted differently, this approach was not seen as feasible for them since they are comparatively more frequently used in deployed content. The following encodings receive this treatment:

- ISO-2022-KR
- ISO-2022-CN
- ISO-2022-CN-EXT
- HZ-GB-2312

== Character references ==
In addition to native character encodings, characters can also be encoded as character references, which can be numeric character references (decimal or hexadecimal) or character entity references. Character entity references are also sometimes referred to as named entities, or HTML entities for HTML. HTML's usage of character references derives from SGML.

=== HTML character references ===
A numeric character reference in HTML refers to a character by its Universal Character Set/Unicode code point, and uses the format

&#nnnn;

or

&#xhhhh;

where nnnn is the code point in decimal form, and hhhh is the code point in hexadecimal form. The x must be lowercase in XML documents. The nnnn or hhhh may be any number of digits and may include leading zeros. The hhhh may mix uppercase and lowercase, though uppercase is the usual style.

Not all web browsers or email clients used by receivers of HTML documents, or text editors used by authors of HTML documents, will be able to render all HTML characters. Most modern software is able to display most or all of the characters for the user's language, and will draw a box or other clear indicator for characters they cannot render.

For codes from 0 to 127, the original 7-bit ASCII standard set, most of these characters can be used without a character reference. Codes from 160 to 255 can all be created using character entity names. Only a few higher-numbered codes can be created using entity names, but all can be created by decimal number character reference.

Character entity references can also have the format &name; where name is a case-sensitive alphanumeric string. For example, "λ" can also be encoded as &lambda; in an HTML document. The character entity references &lt;, &gt;, &quot; and &amp; are predefined in HTML and SGML, because <, >, " and & are already used to delimit markup. This notably did not include XML's &apos; (') entity prior to HTML5. For a list of all named HTML character entity references along with the versions in which they were introduced, see List of XML and HTML character entity references.

Unnecessary use of HTML character references may significantly reduce HTML readability. If the character encoding for a web page is chosen appropriately, then HTML character references are usually only required for markup delimiting characters as mentioned above, and for a few special characters (or none at all if a native Unicode encoding like UTF-8 is used). Incorrect HTML entity escaping may also open up security vulnerabilities for injection attacks such as cross-site scripting. If HTML attributes are left unquoted, certain characters, most importantly whitespace, such as space and tab, must be escaped using entities. Other languages related to HTML have their own methods of escaping characters.

=== XML character references ===
Unlike traditional HTML with its large range of character entity references, in XML there are only five predefined character entity references. These are used to escape characters that are markup sensitive in certain contexts:

Reference	Character	Name	Code point
&amp;	&	ampersand	U+0026
&lt;	<	less-than sign	U+003C
&gt;	>	greater-than sign	U+003E
&quot;	"	quotation mark	U+0022
&apos;	'	apostrophe	U+0027

All other character entity references have to be defined before they can be used. For example, use of &eacute; (which gives é, Latin lower-case E with acute accent, U+00E9 in Unicode) in an XML document will generate an error unless the entity has already been defined. XML also requires that the x in hexadecimal numeric references be in lowercase: for example &#xA1b rather than &#XA1b. XHTML, which is an XML application, supports the HTML entity set, along with XML's predefined entities.

== See also ==
- Charset sniffing – used by many browsers when character encoding metadata is not available
- Unicode and HTML
- Language code
- List of XML and HTML character entity references
