= UTF =

UTF may refer to:

== Computing ==
- Unicode Transformation Format
  - UTF-1
  - UTF-7
  - UTF-8
  - UTF-16
  - UTF-32
  - UTF-EBCDIC

== Other uses ==
- U.T.F. (Undead Task Force), an American comic book title
- Underground Test Facility, used for testing and developing enhanced oil recovery technology in northern Canada
- Unión del Trabajo de Filipinas, in the Philippines
