= BOCU (disambiguation) =

BOCU may refer to:

- Binary Ordered Compression for Unicode
- Borough Operational Command Unit/Basic Command Unit
- Ashiko called the bocu in Cuba
