= Binary Ordered Compression for Unicode =

MIME compatible Unicode compression scheme

Binary Ordered Compression for Unicode (BOCU) is a MIME-compatible Unicode compression scheme. BOCU-1 combines the wide applicability of UTF-8 with the compactness of Standard Compression Scheme for Unicode (SCSU). This Unicode encoding is designed to be useful for compressing short strings, and maintains code point order. BOCU-1 is specified in a Unicode Technical Note.

For comparison SCSU, was adopted as standard Unicode compression scheme with a byte-to-codepoint ratio similar to language-specific code pages. SCSU has not been widely adopted, as it is not suitable for MIME "text" media types. For example, SCSU cannot be used directly in emails and similar protocols. SCSU requires a complex encoder design for good performance. Usually, the zip, bzip2, and other industry-standard algorithms compact larger amounts of Unicode text more efficiently.

Both SCSU and BOCU-1 are IANA registered charsets.

== Details ==
All numbers in this section are hexadecimal, and all ranges are inclusive.

Code points from U+0000 to U+0020 are encoded in BOCU-1 as the corresponding byte value. All other code points (that is, U+0021 through U+D7FF and U+E000 through U+10FFFF) are encoded as a difference between the code point and a normalized version of the most recently encoded code point that was not an ASCII space (U+0020). The initial state is U+0040. The normalization mapping is as follows:

Code range	Normalized code point	Notes
U+3040 to U+309F	U+3070	Hiragana
U+4E00 to U+9FA5	U+7711	Unihan
U+AC00 to U+D7A3	U+C1D1	Hangul
U+0020	encoder state kept as is	Space
U+hhhh00 to U+hhhh7F (excluding ranges above)	U+hhhh40	middle of 128
U+hhhh80 to U+hhhhFF (excluding ranges above)	U+hhhhC0	middle of 128

The difference between the current code point and the normalized previous code point is encoded as follows:

Difference range	Byte sequence range (see below)
-10FF9F to -2DD0D	21 F0 58 D9 to 21 FF FF FF
-2DD0C to -2912	22 01 01 to 24 FF FF
-2911 to -41	25 01 to 4F FF
-40 to 3F	50 to CF
40 to 2910	D0 01 to FA FF
2911 to 2DD0B	FB 01 01 to FD FF FF
2DD0C to 10FFBF	FE 01 01 01 to FE 19 B4 54

Each byte range is lexicographically ordered with the following thirteen byte values excluded: 00 07 08 09 0A 0B 0C 0D 0E 0F 1A 1B 20. For example, the byte sequence FC 06 FF, coding for a difference of 1156B, is immediately followed by the byte sequence FC 10 01, coding for a difference of 1156C.

Any ASCII input U+0000 to U+007F excluding space U+0020 resets the encoder to U+0040. Because the above-mentioned values cover line end code points U+000D and U+000A as is (0D 0A), the encoder is in a known state at the beginning of each line. The corruption of a single byte therefore affects at most one line. For comparison, the corruption of a single byte in UTF-8 affects at most one code point, and for SCSU it can affect the entire document.

BOCU-1 offers a similar robustness also for input texts without the above-mentioned values with the special reset code 0xFF. When a decoder finds this octet it resets its state to U+0040 as for a line end. The use of 0xFF reset bytes is not recommended in the BOCU-1 specification, because it conflicts with other BOCU-1 design goals, notably the binary order.

The optional use of a signature U+FEFF at the begin of BOCU-1 encoded texts, i.e. the BOCU-1 byte sequence FB EE 28, changes the initial state U+0040 to U+FEC0. In other words, the signature cannot simply be stripped as in most other Unicode encoding schemes. Adding a reset byte after the signature (FB EE 28 FF) could avoid this effect, but the BOCU-1 specification does not recommend this practice.

In theory UTF-1 and UTF-8 could encode the original UCS-4 set with 31 bits up to 7FFFFFFF. BOCU-1 and UTF-16 can encode the modern Unicode set from U+0000 to U+10FFFF. Excluding the thirteen protected code points encoded as single octets BOCU-1 can use $256 - 13 = 243$ octets in multi-byte encodings. BOCU-1 needs at most four bytes consisting of a lead byte and one to three trail bytes. The trail bytes encode a remaining "modulo 243" (base 243) difference, the lead byte determines the number of trail bytes and an initial difference. The reset byte 0xFF is not protected and can occur as trail byte.

== Patent ==
Prior to 16 November 2022, the general BOCU algorithm was covered by United States Patent #6,737,994, which also mentions the specific BOCU-1 implementation. This patent has now expired.

IBM, which employed both of the inventors of BOCU-1 at the time it was created, stated in the Unicode Technical Note that implementers of a "fully compliant version of BOCU-1" had to contact IBM to request a royalty-free license. BOCU-1 is the only Unicode compression scheme described on the Unicode Web site that is known to have been encumbered with intellectual property restrictions.

By contrast, IBM also filed for a patent on UTF-EBCDIC, but it chose in that case to make the documentation and encoding scheme "freely available to anyone concerned towards making the transformation format as part of the UCS standards", instead of requiring implementers to request a license.

== Not for HTML ==
W3C and WHATWG HTML standards prohibit supporting BOCU-1 (and SCSU, CESU-8, UTF-7, EBCDIC, and UTF-32) in HTML documents because HTML was not designed with non-ASCII-compatible encodings in mind. In the past, cross-site scripting vulnerabilities due to browsers' poor handling of such encodings have been demonstrated.

== See also ==
- UTF-1 contains a comparison of the UTF-1, UTF-8, and BOCU-1 designs
- International Components for Unicode A library that can convert between BOCU-1 and other Unicode encodings
