= UTF-1 =

Obsolete multibyte encoding for Unicode

- MIME / IANA: ISO-10646-UTF-1
- Language(s): International
- Current status: Obscure, of mainly historical interest.
- Classification: Unicode Transformation Format, extended ASCII, variable-width encoding
- Extends: US-ASCII
- Transforms / Encodes: ISO/IEC 10646 (Unicode)
- Succeeded by: UTF-8

UTF-1 is an obsolete method of transforming ISO/IEC 10646/Unicode into a stream of bytes. Its design does not provide self-synchronization, which makes searching for substrings and error recovery difficult. It reuses the ASCII printing characters for multi-byte encodings, making it unsuited for some uses (for instance Unix filenames cannot contain the byte value used for forward slash). UTF-1 is also slow to encode or decode due to its use of division and multiplication by a number which is not a power of 2. Due to these issues, it did not gain acceptance and was quickly replaced by UTF-8.

== Design ==
Similar to UTF-8, UTF-1 is a variable-width encoding that is backwards-compatible with ASCII. Every Unicode code point is represented by either a single byte, or a sequence of two, three, or five bytes. All ASCII code points are a single byte (the code points U+0080 through U+009F are also single bytes).

UTF-1 does not use the C0 and C1 control codes or the space character in multi-byte encodings: a byte in the range 0–0x20 or 0x7F–0x9F always stands for the corresponding code point. This design with 66 protected characters tried to be ISO/IEC 2022 compatible.

UTF-1 uses "modulo 190" arithmetic (256 − 66 = 190). For comparison, UTF-8 protects all 128 ASCII characters and needs one bit for this, and a second bit to make it self-synchronizing, resulting in "modulo 64" arithmetic (8 − 2 = 6; 2^{6} = 64). BOCU-1 protects only the minimal set required for MIME-compatibility (0x00, 0x07–0x0F, 0x1A–0x1B, and 0x20), resulting in "modulo 243" arithmetic (256 − 13 = 243).

UTF-1
First code point	Last code point	Byte 1	Byte 2	Byte 3	Byte 4	Byte 5
U+0000	U+009F	00–9F				
U+00A0	U+00FF	A0	A0–FF			
U+0100	U+4015	A1–F5	21–7E, A0–FF			
U+4016	U+38E2D	F6–FB	21–7E, A0–FF	21–7E, A0–FF		
U+38E2E	U+7FFFFFFF	FC–FF	21–7E, A0–FF	21–7E, A0–FF	21–7E, A0–FF	21–7E, A0–FF

code point	UTF-8	UTF-1
U+007F	7F	7F
U+0080	C2 80	80
U+009F	C2 9F	9F
U+00A0	C2 A0	A0 A0
U+00BF	C2 BF	A0 BF
U+00C0	C3 80	A0 C0
U+00FF	C3 BF	A0 FF
U+0100	C4 80	A1 21
U+015D	C5 9D	A1 7E
U+015E	C5 9E	A1 A0
U+01BD	C6 BD	A1 FF
U+01BE	C6 BE	A2 21
U+07FF	DF BF	AA 72
U+0800	E0 A0 80	AA 73
U+0FFF	E0 BF BF	B5 48
U+1000	E1 80 80	B5 49
U+4015	E4 80 95	F5 FF
U+4016	E4 80 96	F6 21 21
U+D7FF	ED 9F BF	F7 2F C3
U+E000	EE 80 80	F7 3A 79
U+F8FF	EF A3 BF	F7 5C 3C
U+FDD0	EF B7 90	F7 62 BA
U+FDEF	EF B7 AF	F7 62 D9
U+FEFF	EF BB BF	F7 64 4C
U+FFFD	EF BF BD	F7 65 AD
U+FFFE	EF BF BE	F7 65 AE
U+FFFF	EF BF BF	F7 65 AF
U+10000	F0 90 80 80	F7 65 B0
U+38E2D	F0 B8 B8 AD	FB FF FF
U+38E2E	F0 B8 B8 AE	FC 21 21 21 21
U+FFFFF	F3 BF BF BF	FC 21 37 B2 7A
U+100000	F4 80 80 80	FC 21 37 B2 7B
U+10FFFF	F4 8F BF BF	FC 21 39 6E 6C
U+7FFFFFFF	FD BF BF BF BF BF	FD BD 2B B9 40

Although modern Unicode ends at U+10FFFF, both UTF-1 and UTF-8 were designed to encode the complete 31 bits of the original Universal Character Set (UCS-4), and the last entry in this table shows this original final code point.

== See also ==
- Comparison of Unicode encodings
- Universal Character Set
