= Universal Coded Character Set =

Standard set of characters defined by ISO/IEC 10646

The Universal Coded Character Set (UCS, Unicode) is a standard set of characters defined by the international standard ISO/IEC 10646, Information technology — Universal Coded Character Set (UCS) (plus amendments to that standard), which is the basis of many character encodings, improving as characters from previously unrepresented writing systems are added.

The UCS has over 1.1 million possible code points available for use/allocation, but only the first 65,536, which is the Basic Multilingual Plane (BMP), had entered into common use before 2000. This situation began changing when the People's Republic of China (PRC) ruled in 2006 that all software sold in its jurisdiction would have to support GB 18030. This required software intended for sale in the PRC to move beyond the BMP.

The system deliberately leaves many code points not assigned to characters, even in the BMP. It does this to allow for future expansion or to minimise conflicts with other encoding forms.

The original edition of the UCS defined UTF-16, an extension of UCS-2, to represent code points outside the BMP. A range of code points in the S (Special) Zone of the BMP remains unassigned to characters. UCS-2 disallows use of code values for these code points, but UTF-16 allows their use in pairs. Unicode also adopted UTF-16, but in Unicode terminology, the high-half zone elements become "high surrogates" and the low-half zone elements become "low surrogates".

Another encoding, UTF-32 (previously named UCS-4), uses four bytes (total 32 bits) to encode a single character of the codespace. UTF-32 thereby permits a binary representation of every code point (as of year 2024) in the APIs, and software applications.

== History ==
The International Organization for Standardization (ISO) set out to compose the universal character set in 1989, and published the draft of ISO 10646 in 1990. Hugh McGregor Ross was one of its principal architects.

This work happened independently of the development of the Unicode standard, which had been in development since 1987 by Xerox and Apple.

The original ISO 10646 draft differed markedly from the current standard. It defined:

- 128 groups of
- 256 planes of
- 256 rows of
- 256 cells,

for an apparent total of 2,147,483,648 characters, but actually the standard could code only 679,477,248 characters, as the policy forbade byte values of C0 and C1 control codes (0x00 to 0x1F and 0x80 to 0x9F, in hexadecimal notation) in any one of the four bytes specifying a group, plane, row and cell. The Latin capital letter A, for example, had a location in group 0x20, plane 0x20, row 0x20, cell 0x41.

One could code the characters of this primordial ISO/IEC 10646 standard in one of three ways:

1. UCS-4, four bytes for every character, enabling the simple encoding of all characters;
2. UCS-2, two bytes for every character, enabling the encoding of the first plane, 0x20, the Basic Multilingual Plane, containing the first 36,864 codepoints, straightforwardly, and other planes and groups by switching to them with ISO/IEC 2022 escape sequences;
3. UTF-1, which encodes all the characters in sequences of bytes of varying length (1 to 5 bytes, each of which contain no control codes).

In 1990, therefore, two initiatives for a universal character set existed: Unicode, with 16 bits for every character (65,536 possible characters), and ISO/IEC 10646. The software companies refused to accept the complexity and size requirement of the ISO standard and were able to convince a number of ISO National Bodies to vote against it. ISO officials realised they could not continue to support the standard in its current state and negotiated the unification of their standard with Unicode. Two changes took place: the lifting of the limitation upon characters (prohibition of control code values), thus opening code points for allocation; and the synchronisation of the repertoire of the Basic Multilingual Plane with that of Unicode.

Meanwhile, in the passage of time, the situation changed in the Unicode standard itself: 65,536 characters came to appear insufficient, and the standard from version 2.0 and onwards supports encoding of 1,112,064 code points from 17 planes by means of the UTF-16 surrogate mechanism. For that reason, ISO/IEC 10646 was limited to contain as many characters as could be encoded by UTF-16 and no more, that is, a little over a million characters instead of over 679 million. The UCS-4 encoding of ISO/IEC 10646 was incorporated into the Unicode standard with the limitation to the UTF-16 range and under the name UTF-32, although it has almost no use outside programs' internal data.

Rob Pike and Ken Thompson, the designers of the Plan 9 operating system, devised a new mixed-width encoding that was also backward-compatible with 7-bit ASCII, which came to be called UTF-8, and is currently the most popular UCS encoding.

== Differences from Unicode ==
ISO/IEC 10646 and Unicode have an identical repertoire and numbers—the same characters with the same numbers exist on both standards, although Unicode releases new versions and adds new characters more often. Unicode has rules and specifications outside the scope of ISO/IEC 10646. ISO/IEC 10646 is a simple character map, an extension of previous standards like ISO/IEC 8859. In contrast, Unicode adds rules for collation, normalisation of forms, and the bidirectional algorithm for right-to-left scripts such as Arabic and Hebrew. For interoperability between platforms, especially if bidirectional scripts are used, it is not enough to support ISO/IEC 10646; Unicode must be implemented.

To support these rules and algorithms, Unicode adds many properties to each character in the set such as properties determining a character's default bidirectional class and properties to determine how the character combines with other characters. If the character represents a numeric value such as the European number '8', or the vulgar fraction '¼', that numeric value is also added as a property of the character. Unicode intends these properties to support interoperable text handling with a mixture of languages.

Some applications support ISO/IEC 10646 characters but do not fully support Unicode. One such application, Xterm, can properly display all ISO/IEC 10646 characters that have a one-to-one character-to-glyph mapping and a single directionality. It can handle some combining marks by simple overstriking methods, but cannot display Hebrew (bidirectional), Devanagari (one character to many glyphs) or Arabic (both features). Most GUI applications use standard OS text drawing routines which handle such scripts, although the applications themselves still do not always handle them correctly.

== Citing the Universal Coded Character Set ==
ISO/IEC 10646, a general, informal citation for the ISO/IEC 10646 family of standards, is acceptable in most prose. And even though it is a separate standard, the term Unicode is used just as often, informally, when discussing the UCS. However, any normative references to the UCS as a publication should cite the year of the edition in the form ISO/IEC 10646:{year}, for example: ISO/IEC 10646:2014.

== Relationship with Unicode ==
Since 1991, the Unicode Consortium and the ISO/IEC have developed The Unicode Standard ("Unicode") and ISO/IEC 10646 in tandem. The repertoire, character names, and code points of Unicode Version 2.0 exactly match those of ISO/IEC 10646-1:1993 with its first seven published amendments. After Unicode 3.0 was published in February 2000, corresponding new and updated characters entered the UCS via ISO/IEC 10646-1:2000. In 2003, parts 1 and 2 of ISO/IEC 10646 were combined into a single part, which has since had a number of amendments adding characters to the standard in approximate synchrony with the Unicode standard.

- ISO/IEC 10646-1:1993 = Unicode 1.1
- ISO/IEC 10646-1:1993 plus Amendments 5 to 7 = Unicode 2.0
- ISO/IEC 10646-1:1993 plus Amendments 5 to 7 = Unicode 2.1 excluding Euro sign and Object Replacement Character, which are included in Amendment 18
- ISO/IEC 10646-1:2000 = Unicode 3.0
- ISO/IEC 10646-1:2000 and ISO/IEC 10646-2:2001 = Unicode 3.1
- ISO/IEC 10646-1:2000 plus Amendment 1 and ISO/IEC 10646-2:2001 = Unicode 3.2
- ISO/IEC 10646:2003 = Unicode 4.0
- ISO/IEC 10646:2003 plus Amendment 1 = Unicode 4.1
- ISO/IEC 10646:2003 plus Amendments 1 to 2 = Unicode 5.0 excluding Devanagari letters GGA, JJA, DDDA and BBA, which are included in Amendment 3
- ISO/IEC 10646:2003 plus Amendments 1 to 4 = Unicode 5.1
- ISO/IEC 10646:2003 plus Amendments 1 to 6 = Unicode 5.2
- ISO/IEC 10646:2003 plus Amendments 1 to 8 = ISO/IEC 10646:2011 = Unicode 6.0 excluding Indian rupee sign
- ISO/IEC 10646:2012 = Unicode 6.1
- ISO/IEC 10646:2012 = Unicode 6.2 excluding Turkish lira sign, which is included in Amendment 1
- ISO/IEC 10646:2012 = Unicode 6.3 excluding Turkish lira sign, which is included in Amendment 1, and five bidirectional control characters (Arabic Letter Mark, Left-To-Right Isolate, Right-To-Left Isolate, First Strong Isolate, Pop Directional Isolate), which are included in Amendment 2
- ISO/IEC 10646:2012 plus Amendments 1 and 2 = Unicode 7.0 excluding the Ruble sign
- ISO/IEC 10646:2014 plus Amendment 1 = Unicode 8.0 excluding the Lari sign, nine CJK unified ideographs, and 41 emoji characters
- ISO/IEC 10646:2014 plus Amendments 1 and 2 = Unicode 9.0 excluding Adlam, Newa, Japanese TV symbols, and 74 emoji and symbols
- ISO/IEC 10646:2017 = Unicode 10.0 excluding 285 Hentaigana characters, 3 Zanabazar Square characters, and 56 emoji symbols
- ISO/IEC 10646:2017 plus Amendment 1 = Unicode 11.0 excluding 46 Mtavruli Georgian capital letters, 5 CJK unified ideographs, and 66 emoji characters
- ISO/IEC 10646:2017 plus Amendments 1 and 2 = Unicode 12.0 excluding 62 additional characters
- ISO/IEC 10646:2020 = Unicode 13.0
- ISO/IEC 10646:2020 plus Amendments 1 = Unicode 15.0
- ISO/IEC 10646:2020 plus Amendments 1 and 2 = Unicode 16.0

== See also ==
- Related standards:
  - ISO/IEC 646 (positions 0 to 127 are the same as in ISO/IEC 10646 and Unicode, and the numbers 646 and 10646 are similar)
  - ISO/IEC 2022 Information technology—Character code structure and extension techniques
  - ISO/IEC 6429 C0 and C1 control codes
  - ISO/IEC 8859 (positions 0 through 255 of UCS and Unicode are the same as in ISO/IEC 8859-1, alias ISO Latin 1)
  - ISO/IEC 14651 Information technology – International string ordering and comparison
  - ISO 15924 Codes for the representation of names of scripts (each character is associated with one of those scripts)
- Comparison of Unicode encodings
- List of XML and HTML character entity references
- List of Unicode fonts
- Universal Character Set characters
- ISO/IEC JTC 1/SC 2
