= UTF-16 =

Variable-width encoding of Unicode, using one or two 16-bit code units

- Example of Unicode character encoding through UTF-16
- MIME / IANA: • text/plain;charset=UTF-16 • text/plain; charset=utf-16le • text/plain; charset=utf-16be
- Language: International
- Standard: Unicode Standard
- Classification: Unicode Transformation Format, variable-width encoding
- Extends: UCS-2
- Transforms / Encodes: ISO/IEC 10646 (Unicode)

UTF-16 (16-bit Unicode Transformation Format) is a character encoding that supports all 1,112,064 (Note: This number is in fact a consequence of UTF-16. There are 2^{16} − 2048 + 1024 · 1024 = 1,112,064 code points that can be encoded by UTF-16. Unicode was restricted to these code points when UTF-16 was added to the standard. Before that Unicode had 2^{31} = 2,147,483,648 valid code points.) valid code points of Unicode. The encoding is variable-length as code points are encoded with one or two 16-bit code units. UTF-16 arose from an earlier obsolete fixed-width 16-bit encoding now known as UCS-2 (for 2-byte Universal Character Set), once it became clear that more than 2^{16} (65,536) code points were needed, including most emoji and important CJK characters such as for personal and place names.

UTF-16 is used by the Windows API, and by many programming environments such as Java and Qt. The variable-length character of UTF-16, combined with the fact that most characters are not variable-length (so variable length is rarely tested), has led to many bugs in software, including in Windows itself.

UTF-16 is the only encoding (still) allowed on the web that is incompatible with 8-bit ASCII. (Note: UTF-32 is also incompatible with ASCII, but is not listed as a web-encoding.) It has never gained popularity on the web, where it is declared by under 0.003% of public web pages (and even then, the web pages are most likely also using UTF-8). UTF-8, by comparison, gained dominance years ago and accounted for 99.1% of all web pages by 2026. The Web Hypertext Application Technology Working Group (WHATWG) considers UTF-8 "the mandatory encoding for all [text]" and that for security reasons browser applications should not use UTF-16.

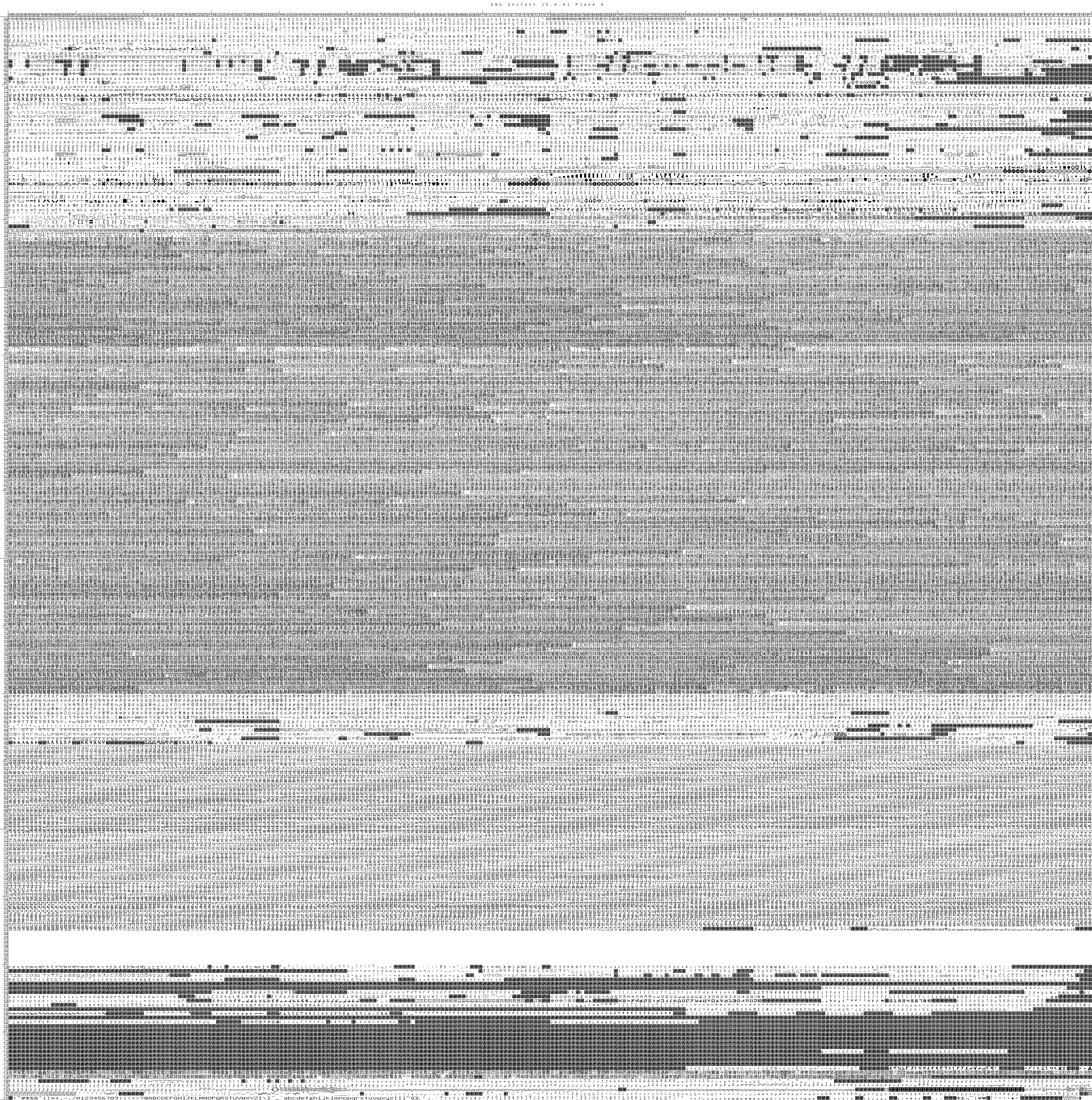
GNU Unifont 16.0.01 Plane 0 map. The white stripe near the bottom is the surrogate code point range.

== History ==
In the late 1980s, work began on developing a uniform encoding for a "Universal Character Set" (UCS) that would replace earlier language-specific encodings with one coordinated system. The goal was to include all required characters from most of the world's languages, as well as symbols from technical domains such as science, mathematics, and music. The original idea was to replace the typical 256-character encodings, which required 1 byte per character, with an encoding using 65,536 (2^{16}) values, which would require 2 bytes (16 bits) per character.

Two groups worked on this in parallel, ISO/IEC JTC 1/SC 2 and the Unicode Consortium, the latter representing mostly manufacturers of computing equipment. The two groups attempted to synchronize their character assignments so that the developing encodings would be mutually compatible. The early 2-byte encoding was called "UCS-2".

When it became increasingly clear that 2^{16} characters would not suffice, IEEE introduced a larger 31-bit space and an encoding (UCS-4) that would require 4 bytes per character. This was resisted by the Unicode Consortium, both because 4 bytes per character wasted a lot of memory and disk space, and because some manufacturers were already heavily invested in 2-byte-per-character technology. The UTF-16 encoding scheme was developed as a compromise and introduced with version 2.0 of the Unicode standard in July 1996. It is fully specified in RFC 2781, published in 2000 by the IETF.

UTF-16 is specified in the latest versions of both the international standard ISO/IEC 10646 and the Unicode Standard. "UCS-2 should now be considered obsolete. It no longer refers to an encoding form in either 10646 or the Unicode Standard." UTF-16 will never be extended to support a larger number of code points or to support the code points that were replaced by surrogates, as this would violate the Unicode Stability Policy with respect to general category or surrogate code points. (Any scheme that remains a self-synchronizing code would require allocating at least one Basic Multilingual Plane (BMP) code point to start a sequence. Changing the purpose of a code point is disallowed.)

== Description ==
Each Unicode code point is encoded either as one or two 16-bit code units. Code points less than 2^{16} ("in the BMP") are encoded with a single 16-bit code unit equal to the numerical value of the code point, as in the older UCS-2. Code points greater than or equal to 2^{16} ("above the BMP") are encoded using two 16-bit code units. These two 16-bit code units are chosen from the UTF-16 surrogate range 0xD800–0xDFFF which had not previously been assigned to characters. Values in this range are not used as characters, and UTF-16 provides no legal way to code them as individual code points. A UTF-16 stream, therefore, consists of single 16-bit codes outside the surrogate range, and pairs of 16-bit values that are within the surrogate range.

=== U+0000 to U+D7FF and U+E000 to U+FFFF ===
Both UTF-16 and UCS-2 encode code points in this range as single 16-bit code units that are numerically equal to the corresponding code points. These code points in the Basic Multilingual Plane (BMP) are the only code points that can be represented in UCS-2. As of Unicode 9.0, some modern non-Latin Asian, Middle-Eastern, and African scripts fall outside this range, as do most emoji characters.

=== Code points from U+010000 to U+10FFFF ===
Code points from the other planes are encoded as two 16-bit code units called a surrogate pair. The first code unit is a high surrogate and the second is a low surrogate (These are also known as "leading" and "trailing" surrogates, respectively, analogous to the leading and trailing bytes of UTF-8.):

UTF-16 decoder
Low High	DC00	DC01	...	DFFF
D800	010000	010001	...	0103FF
D801	010400	010401	...	0107FF
⋮	⋮	⋮	⋱	⋮
DBFF	10FC00	10FC01	...	10FFFF

- 0x10000 is subtracted from the code point (U), leaving a 20-bit number (U') in the hex number range 0x00000–0xFFFFF.
- The high ten bits (in the range 0x000–0x3FF) are added to 0xD800 to give the first 16-bit code unit or high surrogate (W1), which will be in the range 0xD800–0xDBFF.
- The low ten bits (also in the range 0x000–0x3FF) are added to 0xDC00 to give the second 16-bit code unit or low surrogate (W2), which will be in the range 0xDC00–0xDFFF.

Illustrated visually, the distribution of U' between W1 and W2 looks like:

U' = yyyyyyyyyyxxxxxxxxxx  // U - 0x10000
W1 = 110110yyyyyyyyyy      // 0xD800 + yyyyyyyyyy
W2 = 110111xxxxxxxxxx      // 0xDC00 + xxxxxxxxxx

Since the ranges for the high surrogates (0xD800–0xDBFF), low surrogates (0xDC00–0xDFFF), and valid BMP characters (0x0000–0xD7FF, 0xE000–0xFFFF) are disjoint, it is not possible for a surrogate to match a BMP character, or for two adjacent code units to look like a legal surrogate pair. This simplifies searches a great deal. It also means that UTF-16 is self-synchronizing on 16-bit words: whether a code unit starts a character can be determined without examining earlier code units (i.e. the type of code unit can be determined by the ranges of values in which it falls). UTF-8 shares these advantages, but many earlier multi-byte encoding schemes (such as Shift JIS and other Asian multi-byte encodings) did not allow unambiguous searching and could only be synchronized by re-parsing from the start of the string. UTF-16 is not self-synchronizing if one byte is lost or if traversal starts at a random byte.

Because the most commonly used characters are all in the BMP, handling of surrogate pairs is often not thoroughly tested. This leads to persistent bugs and potential security holes, even in popular and well-reviewed application software (e.g. CVE-2008-2938, CVE-2012-2135).

=== U+D800 to U+DFFF (surrogates) ===
The Unicode standard says that no UTF forms, including UTF-16, can encode the surrogate code points. Since these will never be assigned a character, there should be no reason to encode them. However, contemporarily prominent software such as Microsoft Windows allows unpaired surrogates in filenames and other places.

UCS-2, UTF-8, and UTF-32 can encode these code points in trivial and obvious ways, and a large amount of software does so, even though the standard states that such arrangements should be treated as encoding errors. It is possible to unambiguously encode an unpaired surrogate (a high surrogate code point not followed by a low one, or a low one not preceded by a high one) in the format of UTF-16 by using a code unit equal to the code point. The result is not valid UTF-16, but the majority of UTF-16 encoder and decoder implementations do this when translating between encodings.

=== Examples ===
To encode U+10437 (𐐷) to UTF-16:

- Subtract 0x10000 from the code point, leaving 0x0437.
- For the high surrogate, shift right by 10 (divide by 0x400), then add 0xD800, resulting in 0x0001 + 0xD800 = 0xD801.
- For the low surrogate, take the low 10 bits (remainder of dividing by 0x400), then add 0xDC00, resulting in 0x0037 + 0xDC00 = 0xDC37.

To decode U+10437 (𐐷) from UTF-16:

- Take the high surrogate (0xD801) and subtract 0xD800, then multiply by 0x400, resulting in 0x0001 × 0x400 = 0x0400.
- Take the low surrogate (0xDC37) and subtract 0xDC00, resulting in 0x37.
- Add these two results together (0x0437), and finally add 0x10000 to get the final code point, 0x10437.

The following table summarizes this conversion, as well as others. The colors indicate how bits from the code point are distributed among the UTF-16 bytes. Additional bits added by the UTF-16 encoding process are shown in black.

Code point		Code point (binary)	UTF-16 encoding form (binary)	UTF-16 encoding form (hexadecimal)	UTF-16BE encoding scheme (hexadecimal)	UTF-16LE encoding scheme (hexadecimal)
$	U+0024	0000 0000 0010 0100	0000 0000 0010 0100	0024	00 24	24 00
€	U+20AC	0010 0000 1010 1100	0010 0000 1010 1100	20AC	20 AC	AC 20
𐐷	U+10437	0001 0000 0100 0011 0111	1101 1000 0000 0001 1101 1100 0011 0111	D801 DC37	D8 01 DC 37	01 D8 37 DC
𤭢	U+24B62	0010 0100 1011 0110 0010	1101 1000 0101 0010 1101 1111 0110 0010	D852 DF62	D8 52 DF 62	52 D8 62 DF

== Byte-order encoding schemes ==
UTF-16 and UCS-2 produce a sequence of 16-bit code units. Since most communication and storage protocols are defined for bytes, and each unit thus takes two 8-bit bytes, the order of the bytes may depend on the endianness (byte order) of the computer architecture.

To assist in recognizing the byte order of code units, UTF-16 allows a byte order mark (BOM), a code point with the value U+FEFF, to precede the first actual coded value. (Note: UTF-8 encoding produces byte values strictly less than 0xFE, so either byte in the BOM sequence also identifies the encoding as UTF-16 (assuming that UTF-32 is not expected).) (U+FEFF is the invisible zero-width non-breaking space/ZWNBSP character). (Note: Use of U+FEFF as the character ZWNBSP instead of as a BOM has been deprecated in favor of U+2060 (WORD JOINER); see Byte Order Mark (BOM) FAQ at Unicode.org. But if an application interprets an initial BOM as a character, the ZWNBSP character is invisible, so the impact is minimal.) If the endian architecture of the decoder matches that of the encoder, the decoder detects the 0xFEFF value, but an opposite-endian decoder interprets the BOM as the noncharacter value U+FFFE reserved for this purpose. This incorrect result provides a hint to perform byte-swapping for the remaining values.

If the BOM is missing, RFC 2781 recommends (Note: RFC 2781 section 4.3 says that if there is no BOM, "the text SHOULD be interpreted as being big-endian." According to section 1.2, the meaning of the term "SHOULD" is governed by RFC 2119. In that document, section 3 says "... there may exist valid reasons in particular circumstances to ignore a particular item, but the full implications must be understood and carefully weighed before choosing a different course".) that big-endian (BE) encoding be assumed. In practice, due to Windows using little-endian (LE) order by default, many applications assume little-endian encoding. It is also reliable to detect endianness by looking for null bytes, on the assumption that characters less than U+0100 are very common. If more even bytes (starting at 0) are null, then it is big-endian.

The standard also allows the byte order to be stated explicitly by specifying UTF-16BE or UTF-16LE as the encoding type. When the byte order is specified explicitly this way, a BOM is specifically not supposed to be prepended to the text, and a U+FEFF at the beginning should be handled as a ZWNBSP character. Most applications ignore a BOM in all cases despite this rule.

For Internet protocols, IANA has approved "UTF-16", "UTF-16BE", and "UTF-16LE" as the names for these encodings (the names are case insensitive). The aliases UTF_16 or UTF16 may be meaningful in some programming languages or software applications, but they are not standard names in Internet protocols.

Similar designations, UCS-2BE and UCS-2LE, are used to show versions of UCS-2.

== Efficiency ==
A singular Unicode extended grapheme cluster may consist of any number of Unicode code points, each of which in UTF-16 might require one or two code units. As a consequence, there is no easily expressible relation between the number of extended grapheme clusters and the number of UTF-16 code units for a given piece of text.

UTF-16 is often claimed to be more space-efficient than UTF-8 for East Asian languages, since it uses two bytes for characters that take 3 bytes in UTF-8. Since real text contains many spaces, numbers, punctuation, markup (for e.g. web pages), and control characters, which take only one byte in UTF-8, this is only true for artificially constructed dense blocks of text. A more serious claim can be made for Devanagari and Bengali, which use multi-letter words and all the letters take 3 bytes in UTF-8 and only 2 in UTF-16.

== Usage ==
A method to determine what encoding a system is using internally is to ask for the "length" of string containing a single non-BMP character. If the length is 2 then UTF-16 is being used. 4 indicates UTF-8. 3 or 6 may indicate CESU-8. 1 may indicate UTF-32, but more likely indicates the language decodes the string to code points before measuring the "length".

=== Operating systems ===
UTF-16 is used for text in the OS API of all currently supported versions of Microsoft Windows (and including at least Windows CE since Windows CE 5.0 and Windows NT since Windows 2000). Windows NT prior to Windows 2000 only supported UCS-2. Windows 9x only supported UCS-2, and support of Unicode is limited to internal, such as VFAT and WDM. Since Windows 10 version 1903 (or insider build 17035) it has been possible to use UTF-8 in the API, though most software, such as Windows File Explorer, still uses UTF-16 API. Microsoft has stated that "UTF-16 [..] is a unique burden that Windows places on code that targets multiple platforms"

The IBM i operating system designates CCSID (code page) 13488 for UCS-2 encoding and CCSID 1200 for UTF-16 encoding, though the system treats them both as UTF-16.

=== Application platforms and frameworks ===
UTF-16 is used by the Qualcomm BREW platform; the .NET environments; and the Qt cross-platform graphical widget toolkit.

=== File systems ===
The Joliet file system, used in CD-ROM media, encodes file names using UCS-2BE (up to sixty-four Unicode characters per file name). NTFS and ReFS use UTF-16 to store strings.

=== Messaging ===
SMS text messaging effectively uses UTF-16. The 3GPP TS 23.038 (GSM) and IS-637 (CDMA) standards specify UCS-2, but UTF-16 is necessary for Emoji to work. Symbian OS used in Nokia S60 handsets and Sony Ericsson UIQ handsets uses UCS-2. iPhone handsets use UTF-16.

=== Programming languages ===
Python version 2.0 officially only used UCS-2 internally, but the UTF-8 decoder to "Unicode" produced correct UTF-16. There was also the ability to compile Python so that it used UTF-32 internally, this was sometimes done on Unix. Python 3.3 switched internal storage to use one of ISO-8859-1, UCS-2, or UTF-32 depending on the largest code point in the string. Python 3.12 drops some functionality (for CPython extensions) to make it easier to migrate to UTF-8 for all strings.

Java originally used UCS-2, and added UTF-16 supplementary character support in J2SE 5.0. All strings in memory are UTF-16 (since Java 9, strings containing only ISO-8859-1 characters can be "compressed" to bytes). Java I/O uses UTF-8 or Modified UTF-8.

JavaScript may use UCS-2 or UTF-16.

C# uses UTF-16 for strings. Recently the ability to use UTF-8 strings was added as well as some .NET functions that use them.

Swift, Apple's preferred application language, used UTF-16 to store strings until version 5 which switched to UTF-8.

Quite a few languages make the encoding part of the string object, and thus store and support a large set of encodings including UTF-16. Most consider UTF-16 and UCS-2 to be different encodings. Examples are the PHP language, MySQL, and JavaScript since ES2015.

In some languages the only way to put a non-BMP character into a UTF-16 string constant is to write both surrogate halves, for instance writing "\uD834\uDD1E" instead of "\U0001D11E" for U+1D11E.

=== Firmware ===
UEFI uses UTF-16 to encode strings by default. Since at least UEFI 2.4, it can use ASCII to encode ASCII-only strings.

== See also ==
- CESU-8
- Comparison of Unicode encodings
- Plane (Unicode)
- UTF-32
- UTF-8
