= ASMO 449 =

7-bit coded character set

- Alias(es): iso-ir-89
- Standard: ASMO 449, ISO 9036
- Classification: 7-bit encoding, non-Latin ISO 646 modification with natural letter ordering
- Succeeded by: ASMO 708 (ISO-8859-6)

ASMO 449 is a now technologically obsolete 7-bit coded character set to encode the Arabic language.

== History ==
This character set was devised by the now extinct Arab Standardization and Metrology Organization in 1982 to be the 7-bit standard to be used in Arabic-speaking countries. The design of this character set is derived from the 7-bit ISO 646 (version of 1973) but with modifications suited for the Arabic language. In code points ranging from 0x41 to 0x72 (hexadecimal), Latin letters were replaced with Arabic letters. Punctuation marks which were identical in the Latin and Arabic scripts remained the same, but where they differed (comma, semicolon, question mark), the Latin ones were replaced by Arabic ones. Only nominal letters are encoded, no preshaped forms of the letters, so shaping processing is required for display. This character set is not bidirectional and was intended to be used in right to left writing. Therefore, symmetrical pairs of punctuation marks (( and ), < and >, [ and ], { and }) appear reversed () and (, > and <, ] and [, } and {).

ASMO 449 was registered in the International Register of Coded Character Sets as IR 089 in 1985 and approved as an ISO standard as ISO 9036:1987 Information processing - Arabic 7-bit coded character set for information interchange.

== Character set ==
ASMO 449 (1982)
	0	1	2	3	4	5	6	7	8	9	A	B	C	D	E	F
0x	NUL	SOH	STX	ETX	EOT	ENQ	ACK	BEL	BS	HT	LF	VT	FF	CR	SO	SI
1x	DLE	DC1	DC2	DC3	DC4	NAK	SYN	ETB	CAN	EM	SUB	ESC	FS	GS	RS	US
2x	SP	!	"	#	¤	%	&	'	)	(	*	+	،	-	.	/
3x	0	1	2	3	4	5	6	7	8	9	:	؛	>	=	<	؟
4x	@	ء	آ	أ	ؤ	إ	ئ	ا	ب	ة	ت	ث	ج	ح	خ	د
5x	ذ	ر	ز	س	ش	ص	ض	ط	ظ	ع	غ	]	\	[		_
6x	ـ	ف	ق	ك	ل	م	ن	ه	و	ى	ي	ً	ٌ	ٍ	َ	ُ
7x	ِ	ّ	ْ									}	|	{	~	DEL

There is a variant, sometimes named ASMO 449+ which adds the characters NBSP in 0x75, "ﹳ" in 0x76, "لآ" in 0x77, "لأ" in 0x78, "لإ" in 0x79 and "لا" in 0x7A.

== Relationship with other character sets ==
ASMO 449 is a 7-bit character set. Although some encodings allocate this 7-bit character set in the upper part of the 8-bit character set, it should not be confused with ASMO 708. In the character sets that allocate ASMO 449 (or some variant of it) in the upper part of the 8-bit character set, the existence of apparently repeated characters is because the characters in the lower part are for left-to-right script while the characters in the upper part are for right-to-left script. When ASMO 449 (or some variant of it) is allocated to the upper part of the 8-bit character set, it has Arabic digits.

- Al-Arabi adds the characters NBS in 0xF5, "-" in 0xF6, "÷" in 0xF7, "×" in 0xF8, "«" in 0xF9 and "»" in 0xFA, and replaces "ـ" with "`"; this character set is sometimes referred as Code Page 768 (not an official IBM code page).
- DEC's DEC/8/ASMO has the same repertoire and the same sequence of Arabic characters but dislocates them.
- HP's Arabic-8 is also based on ASMO 449;
- Apple's MacArabic adds French, German and Spanish characters in their typical code points from MacRoman, and adds letters for Persian and Urdu.
- Apple's MacFarsi replaces the Arabic digits from MacArabic with Persian ones.
- The Code Table 7 from MARC-8 allocates ASMO 449 in the lower part of the 8-bit character set and allocates the upper part with the Arabic Extension (ISO 11822 / IR 224).
- Microsoft's Code page 709, for MS-DOS, adds French and German characters in their typical code points from code page 437.
