= Uconv =

Conversion utility software

In computing, uconv is a command-line tool that is bundled with International Components for Unicode that converts text files between different character encodings. It is very similar to the iconv command that is part of the Single UNIX Specification which is usually implemented using libiconv. In fact the command line options for transcoding are the same. The command uconv can also convert to and from various Unicode normalization forms.

There is also an alternative implementation written in Ruby. It was written to supplement support of Japanese encoding in Ruby's XML Parser.

== See also ==
- iconv – Standard UNIX utility
- International Components for Unicode – Software library
