= Language recognition =

Language recognition may refer to:

- Language identification
- Natural-language understanding
- Speech recognition
