= Arab Standardization and Metrology Organization =

Agency overview
- Formed: 1965; 61 years ago
- Dissolved: 1989
- Superseding agency: Arab Industrial Development and Mining Organization

The Arab Organization for Standardization and Metrology (Arabic: المنظمة العربية للمواصفات والمقاييس) (French: Organisation arabe de normalisation et de métrologie, Spanish: Organización Arabe de Unificación de Normas y Metrologia), also known as Arab Organization for Standardization and Measures, was founded in 1965 as a specialized agency under the Arab League by the Council of Arab Economic Unity.

The organization's functions included offering technical advice to Arab states on systems of weights and measures; providing professional training and research on industrial production quality, metrology, test and inspection methods; and seeking standardization of technical terms and product specifications between member nations. Their first general committee was held on March 25, 1968.

The organization was merged in the 1990s with other organizations to form the Arab Industrial Development and Mining Organization.

== Standards ==
- ASMO 449
- ASMO 708
