= Arab Industrial Development, Standardization and Mining Organization =

The Arab Industrial Development, Standardization and Mining Organization (AIDSMO) (Arabic: المنظمة العربية للتنمية الصناعية والتقييس والتعدين) is an intergovernmental organization focus on development of the industrial sector around the Arab world. It is an observer of the World Intellectual Property Organization (WIPO).

== History ==
In a summit in Kuwait in 1966 the Arab League decided to establish an organization to improve and develop the industry in general. The decision was approved by the Council of Arab Economic Unity in 1968 and Arab Standardization and Metrology Organization was formed and the headquarters was established in Cairo.

In 1975, the Arab Ministries of Industries freed the organization from the Arab League influence and it became an independent organization, under Arab Industrial Development and Mining Organization. The organization's headquarters was moved from Cairo to Tunis temporarily from 1979 to 1980.

== Members ==
There are 21 members in the AIDMO, all are members in the Arab League.

1. Jordan
2. United Arab Emirates
3. Bahrain
4. Algeria
5. Tunisia
6. Djibouti
7. Saudi Arabia
8. Sudan
9. Syria
10. Somalia
11. Iraq
12. Oman
13. Palestine
14. Qatar
15. Kuwait
16. Lebanon
17. Libya
18. Egypt
19. Morocco
20. Mauritania
21. Yemen

== See also ==
- Arab League
- Arab Monetary Fund
- Council of Arab Economic Unity (CAEU)
