= UTF-32 =

Encoding Unicode characters as 4 bytes per code point

UTF-32 (32-bit Unicode Transformation Format), sometimes called UCS-4, is a fixed-length encoding used to encode Unicode code points that uses exactly 32 bits (four bytes) per code point (but a number of leading bits must be zero as there are far fewer than 2^{32} Unicode code points, actually needing only 21 bits). In contrast, all other Unicode transformation formats are variable-length encodings. Each 32-bit value in UTF-32 represents one Unicode code point and is exactly equal to that code point's numerical value.

The main advantage of UTF-32 is that the Unicode code points are directly indexed. Finding the Nth code point in a sequence of code points is a constant-time operation. In contrast, a variable-length code requires linear-time to count N code points from the start of the string. This makes UTF-32 a simple replacement in code that uses integers that are incremented by one to examine each location in a string, as was commonly done for ASCII. Novice programmers often vastly overestimate how useful this is.

The main disadvantage of UTF-32 is that it is space-inefficient, using four bytes per code point, including 11 bits that are always zero. Characters beyond the BMP are relatively rare in most texts (except, for example, in the case of texts with some popular emojis), and can typically be ignored for sizing estimates. This makes UTF-32 close to twice the size of UTF-16. It can be up to four times the size of UTF-8 depending on how many of the characters are in the ASCII subset.

== History ==
The original ISO/IEC 10646 standard defines a 32-bit encoding form called UCS-4, in which each code point in the Universal Character Set (UCS) is represented by a 31-bit value from 0 to 0x7FFFFFFF (the sign bit was unused and zero). In November 2003, Unicode was restricted by RFC 3629 to match the constraints of the UTF-16 encoding: explicitly prohibiting code points greater than U+10FFFF (and also the high and low surrogates U+D800 through U+DFFF). This limited subset defines UTF-32. Although the ISO standard had (as of 1998 in Unicode 2.1) "reserved for private use" 0xE00000 to 0xFFFFFF, and 0x60000000 to 0x7FFFFFFF these areas were removed in later versions. Because the Principles and Procedures document of ISO/IEC JTC 1/SC 2 Working Group 2 states that all future assignments of code points will be constrained to the Unicode range, UTF-32 will be able to represent all UCS code points and UTF-32 and UCS-4 are identical.

== Utility of fixed width ==
A fixed number of bytes per code point has theoretical advantages, but each of these has problems in reality:

- Truncation becomes easier, but not significantly so compared to UTF-8 and UTF-16 (both of which can search backwards for the point to truncate by looking at 2–4 code units at most). (Note: For UTF-8: Select point to truncate at. If the byte before it is 0-0x7F, or the byte after it is anything other than the continuation bytes 0x80-0xBF, the string can be truncated at that point. Otherwise search up to 3 bytes backwards for such a point and truncate at that. If not found, truncate at the original position. This works even if there are encoding errors in the UTF-8. UTF-16 is trivial and only has to back up one word at most.)
- Finding the Nth "character" in a string. Finding the Nth code point is a O(1) problem, while it is O(n) problem in a variable-width encoding. However what a user might call a "character" is still variable-width, for instance the combining character sequence á is two code points, the emoji 👨‍🦲 is three, and the ligature ﬀ is one.
- Quickly knowing the "width" of a string. However even "fixed width" fonts have varying width, often CJK ideographs are twice as wide, plus the already-mentioned problems with the number of code points not being equal to the number of characters.

== Use ==
The main use of UTF-32 is in internal APIs where the data is single code points or glyphs, rather than strings of characters. For instance, in modern text rendering, it is common that the last step is to build a list of structures each containing coordinates (x, y), attributes, and a single UTF-32 code point identifying the glyph to draw. Often non-Unicode information is stored in the "unused" 11 bits of each word.

Use of UTF-32 strings on Windows (where wchar_t is 16 bits) is almost non-existent. On Unix systems, UTF-32 strings are sometimes, but rarely, used internally by applications, due to the type wchar_t being defined as 32-bit.

UTF-32 is also forbidden as an HTML character encoding.

=== Programming languages ===
Python versions up to 3.2 can be compiled to use UTF-32 strings instead of UTF-16; from version 3.3 onward, Unicode strings are stored in UTF-32 if there is at least 1 non-BMP character in the string, but with leading zero bytes optimized away "depending on the [code point] with the largest Unicode ordinal (1, 2, or 4 bytes)" to make all code points that size.

The Julia programming language moved away from built-in UTF-32 support with its 1.0 release, simplifying the language to having only UTF-8 strings (with all the other encodings considered legacy and moved out of the standard library to package) following the "UTF-8 Everywhere Manifesto".

C++11 has 2 built-in data types that use UTF-32. The char32_t data type stores 1 character in UTF-32. The u32string data type stores a string of UTF-32-encoded characters. A UTF-32-encoded character or string literal is marked with U before the character or string literal.

#include <string> 
char32_t UTF32_character = U'🔟'; // also written as U'\U0001F51F'
std::u32string UTF32_string = U"UTF–32-encoded string"; // defined as `const char32_t*´

C# has a UTF32Encoding class which represents Unicode characters as bytes, rather than as a string.

== Variants ==
Though technically invalid, the surrogate halves are often encoded and allowed. This allows invalid UTF-16 (such as Windows filenames) to be translated to UTF-32, similar to how the WTF-8 variant of UTF-8 works. Sometimes paired surrogates are encoded instead of non-BMP characters, similar to CESU-8. Due to the large number of unused 32-bit values, it is also possible to preserve invalid UTF-8 by using non-Unicode values to encode UTF-8 errors, though there is no standard for this.

UTF-32 has 2 versions for big-endian and little-endian: UTF-32-BE and UTF-32-LE.

== See also ==
- Comparison of Unicode encodings
- UTF-16
