= MacArabic encoding =

Apple computer text character encoding

MacArabic encoding is an obsolete encoding for Arabic (and English) text that was used in Apple Macintosh computers to texts.

The encoding is identical to MacFarsi encoding, except the numerals.

MacArabic
	0	1	2	3	4	5	6	7	8	9	A	B	C	D	E	F
2x	SP	!	"	#	$	%	&	'	(	)	*	+	,/٬	-	./٫	/
3x	0	1	2	3	4	5	6	7	8	9	:	;	<	=	>	?
4x	@	A	B	C	D	E	F	G	H	I	J	K	L	M	N	O
5x	P	Q	R	S	T	U	V	W	X	Y	Z	[	\	]		_
6x	`	a	b	c	d	e	f	g	h	i	j	k	l	m	n	o
7x	p	q	r	s	t	u	v	w	x	y	z	{	|	}	~	DEL
8x	Ä	NBSP	Ç	É	Ñ	Ö	Ü	á	à	â	ä	ں	«	ç	é	è
9x	ê	ë	í	…	î	ï	ñ	ó	»	ô	ö	÷	ú	ù	û	ü
Ax	SP	!	"	#	$	٪	&	'	(	)	*	+	،	-	.	/
Bx	٠	١	٢	٣	٤	٥	٦	٧	٨	٩	:	؛	<	=	>	؟
Cx	❊	ء	آ	أ	ؤ	إ	ئ	ا	ب	ة	ت	ث	ج	ح	خ	د
Dx	ذ	ر	ز	س	ش	ص	ض	ط	ظ	ع	غ	[	\	]	^	_
Ex	ـ	ف	ق	ك	ل	م	ن	ه	و	ى	ي	ً	ٌ	ٍ	َ	ُ
Fx	ِ	ّ	ْ	پ	ٹ	چ	ە	ڤ	گ	ڈ	ڑ	{	|	}	ژ	ے

Characters which should be treated with strong right-to-left direction.
Characters which should be treated with strong left-to-right direction.

== See also ==
- Arabic script in Unicode
