= Dave Opstad =

American computer scientist (born c. 1954)

David G. Opstad (born c. 1954) is a retired American computer scientist specializing during his career in computer typography and information processing (focusing on character encodings), leading to several breakthroughs. Opstad was a contributor to Unicode 1.0, together with Joe Becker, Lee Collins, Huan-mei Liao, and Nelson Ng.

Opstad spent much of his career in private industry at Apple, where he contributed to its TrueType font specifications. His work on TrueType GX, although not much used or supported in its own time, formed the basis for OpenType Font Variations as they can be applied to TrueType outline fonts—all OpenType fonts with quadratic Bézier curves.

Opstad is named on several US software patents.

== Education ==
Opstad has a Bachelor of Arts in Chinese and a Master of Library Science from University of California, Los Angeles.

== Career ==
Among tech companies Opstad has worked for are Xerox, and Apple; he retired from the industry in 2021, leaving Monotype after more than 16 years.

During his time at Apple, he was responsible for AAT, where he designed (for example) the OpenType Zapf table, named after the type designer Hermann Zapf. In the 1990s, Dave Opstad worked with Tom Rickner and others to develop TrueType GX. At that time software producers like Microsoft or Adobe did not implement the necessary support for this new technology, however, TrueType GX would later become the basis of modern variable fonts, (also known as OpenType Font Variations).

Besides his work on font standards, Opstad's work on the earliest versions of Unicode—proposing the use of discrete 16-bit character codes (which was later increased, but retained via backwards compatible surrogate pairs), rather than the way that was then common and which he'd grown frustrated with, Xerox's Character Code Standard (XCCS)—led to easy exchange of messages between different computer hardware and operating systems without either mojibake or "tofu" ⟨□; �⟩.
