= Abbreviation =

Shortened form of a word or phrase

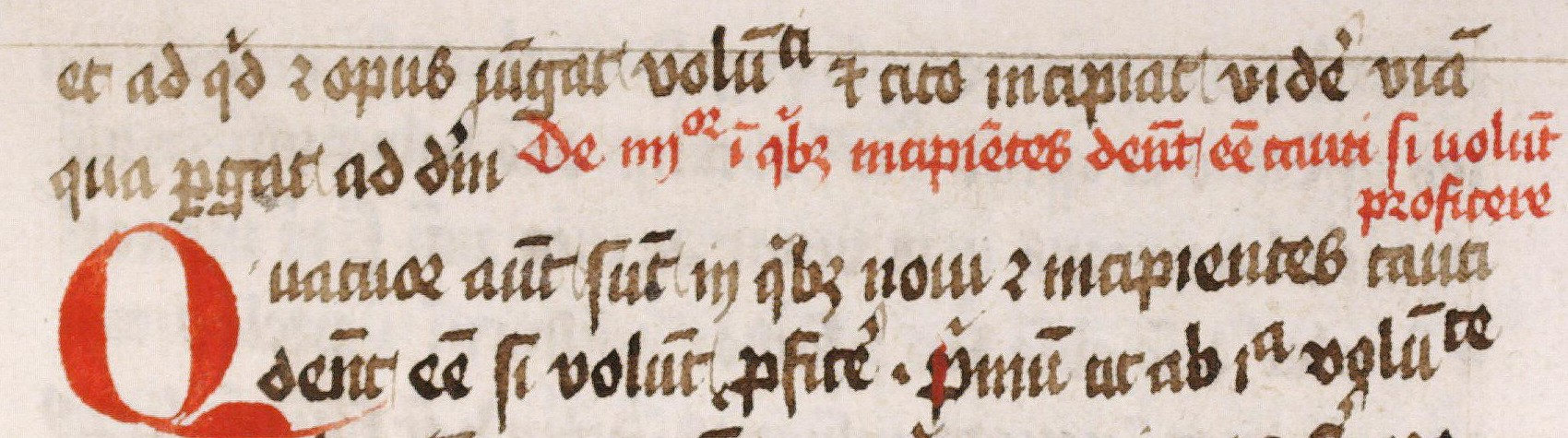
Example of 15th-century Latin manuscript text with scribal abbreviations

An abbreviation (from Latin brevis 'short') is a shortened form of a word or phrase, by any method including shortening, contraction, initialism (which includes acronym), or crasis. An abbreviation may be a shortened form of a word, usually ended with a trailing full stop (period). For example, the term etc. is the usual abbreviation for the Latin phrase et cetera.

== Types ==
A contraction is an abbreviation formed by leaving out letters or sounds, typically replaced by an apostrophe in English. Examples include I'm for I am and li'l for little.

An initialism or acronym is an abbreviation consisting of the initial letter of a sequence of words without other punctuation. For example, FBI (/ˌɛf.biːˈaɪ/), USA (/ˌjuː.ɛsˈeɪ/), IBM (/ˌaɪ.biːˈɛm/), BBC (/ˌbiː.biːˈsiː/). When initialism is used as the preferred term, acronym refers more specifically to when the abbreviation is pronounced as a word rather than as separate letters; examples include SWAT and NASA.

Initialisms, contractions and crasis share some semantic and phonetic functions, and are connected by the term abbreviation in loose parlance.

== History ==
In early times, abbreviations may have been common due to the effort involved in writing (many inscriptions were carved in stone) or to provide secrecy via obfuscation.

Reduction of a word to a single letter was common in both Greek and Roman writing. In Roman inscriptions, "Words were commonly abbreviated by using the initial letter or letters of words, and most inscriptions have at least one abbreviation". However, "some could have more than one meaning, depending on their context. (For example, ⟨A⟩ can be an abbreviation for many words, such as ager, amicus, annus, as, Aulus, Aurelius, aurum, and avus.)" Many frequent abbreviations consisted of more than one letter: for example COS for consul and COSS for its nominative etc. plural consules.

Abbreviations were frequently used in early English. Manuscripts of copies of the Old English poem Beowulf used many abbreviations, for example the Tironian et (⁊) or & for and, and y for since, so that "not much space is wasted". The standardisation of English in the 15th through 17th centuries included a growth in the use of such abbreviations. At first, abbreviations were sometimes represented with various suspension signs, not only periods. For example, sequences like ⟨er⟩ were replaced with ⟨ɔ⟩, as in mastɔ for master and exacɔbate for exacerbate. While this may seem trivial, it was symptomatic of an attempt by people manually reproducing academic texts to reduce the copy time.

Mastɔ subwardenɔ y ɔmēde me to you. And wherɔ y wrot to you the last wyke that y trouyde itt good to differrɔ thelectionɔ ovɔ to quīdenaɔ tinitatis y have be thougħt me synɔ that itt woll be thenɔ a bowte mydsomɔ.

— Warden of Merton College, University of Oxford in Registrum Annalium Collegii Mertonensis, 1503.

In the Early Modern English period, between the 15th and 17th centuries, the thorn Þ was used for th, as in Þ^{e} ('the'). In modern times, ⟨Þ⟩ was often used (in the form ⟨y⟩) for promotional reasons, as in Y^{e} Olde Tea Shoppe.

During the growth of philological linguistic theory in academic Britain, abbreviating became very fashionable. Likewise, a century earlier in Boston, a fad of abbreviation started that swept the United States, with the globally popular term OK generally credited as a remnant of its influence.

Over the years, however, the lack of convention in some style guides has made it difficult to determine which two-word abbreviations should be abbreviated with periods and which should not. This question is considered below.

Widespread use of electronic communication through mobile phones and the Internet during the 1990s led to a marked rise in colloquial abbreviation. This was due largely to increasing popularity of textual communication services such as instant and text messaging. The original SMS supported message lengths of 160 characters at most (using the GSM 03.38 character set), for instance. (Note: Modern text messaging is not affected by this issue although, behind the scenes, longer messages are carried in multiple 160-byte short messages in a chain. Characters not in GSM 03.38 require two bytes.) This brevity gave rise to an informal abbreviation scheme sometimes called Textese, with which 10% or more of the words in a typical SMS message are abbreviated. More recently Twitter, a popular social networking service, began driving abbreviation use with 140 character message limits.

In HTML, abbreviations can be annotated using a dedicated tag: <abbr title="Editor">Ed.</abbr> In this example, the meaning of "Ed." as "Editor" is revealed by hovering the cursor over it.

== Style conventions in English ==
In modern English, there are multiple conventions for abbreviation, and there is controversy as to which should be used. One generally accepted rule is to be consistent in a body of work. To this end, publishers may express their preferences in a style guide.

Some controversies that arise are described below.

=== Capitalization ===
If the original word was capitalized then the first letter of its abbreviation should retain the capital, for example Lev. for Leviticus. When a word is abbreviated to more than a single letter and was originally spelled with lower case letters then there is no need for capitalization. However, when abbreviating a phrase where only the first letter of each word is taken, then all letters should be capitalized, as in YTD for year-to-date, PCB for printed circuit board and FYI for for your information. However, see the following section regarding abbreviations that have become common vocabulary: these are no longer written with capital letters.

=== Full stops (periods) ===
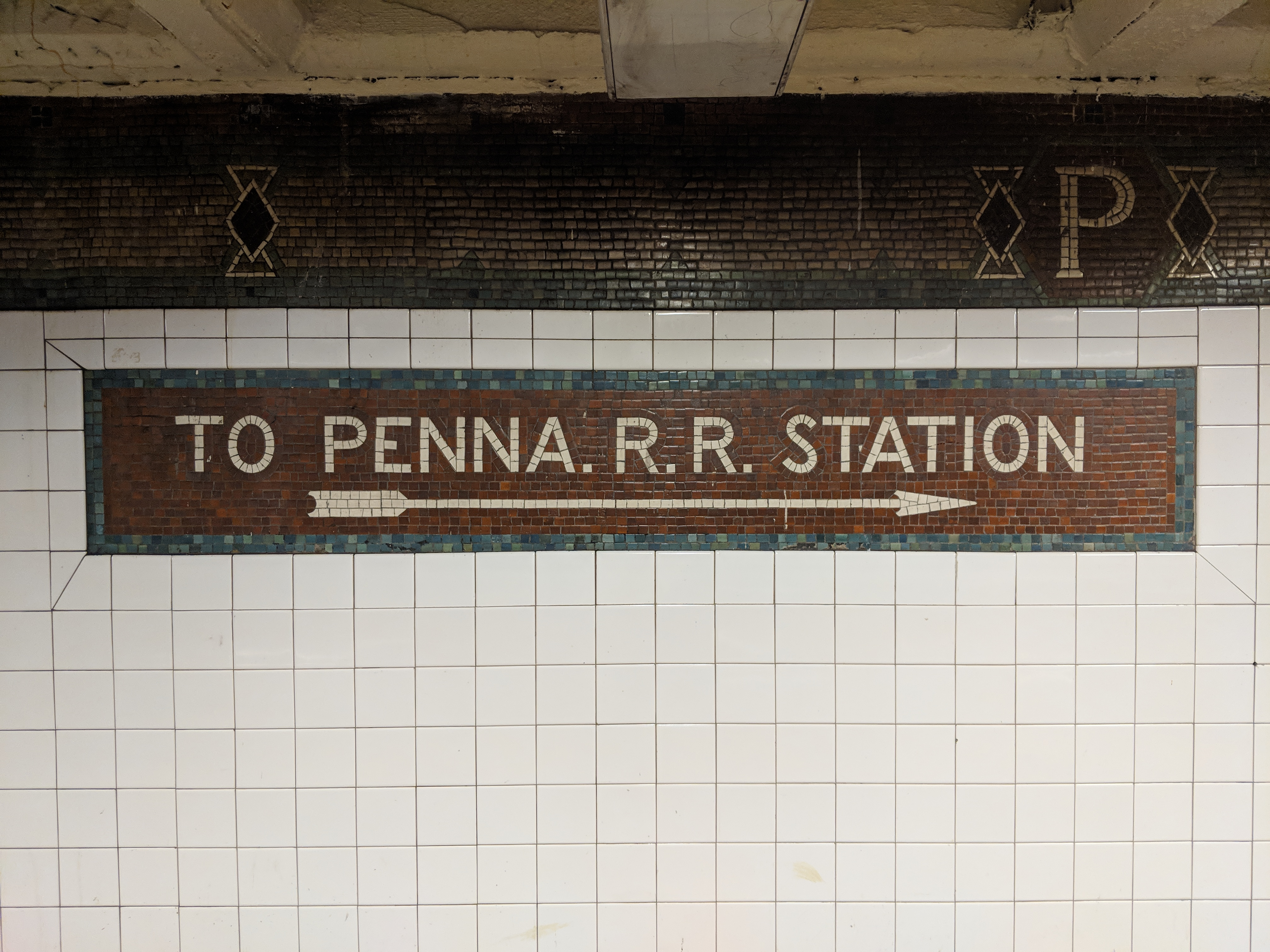
Sign in New York City subway, reading "Penna." for Pennsylvania, showing American style of including the period (full stop) even for contractions

A period (full stop) is sometimes used to signify abbreviation, but opinion is divided as to when and if this convention is best practice.

According to Hart's Rules, a word shortened by dropping letters from the end terminates with a full stop (period), whereas a word shorted by dropping letters from the middle does not. Fowler's Modern English Usage says a full stop (period) is used for both of these shortened forms, but recommends against this practice. It advises it only for end-shortened words and lower-case initialisms, not for middle-shortened words and upper-case initialisms.

Full form	Shortening	Short form	Source
Doctor	mid	Dr	D——r
Professor	end	Prof.	Prof...
The Reverend	end	Rev.	Rev...
The Reverend	mid	Revd	Rev——d
The Right Honourable	mid and end	Rt Hon.	R——t Hon...

Some British style guides, such as for The Guardian and The Economist, disallow periods for all abbreviations.

In American English, the period is usually included regardless of whether or not it is a contraction, e.g. Dr. or Mrs. In some cases, periods are optional, as in either US or U.S. for United States, EU or E.U. for European Union, and UN or U.N. for United Nations. There are some house styles, however—American ones included—that remove the periods from almost all abbreviations. For example:

- The U.S. Manual on Uniform Traffic Control Devices advises that periods should not be used with abbreviations on road signs, except for cardinal directions as part of a destination name. (For example, "Northwest Blvd", "W. Jefferson", and "PED XING" all follow this recommendation.)
- AMA style, used in many medical journals, uses no periods in abbreviations or acronyms, with almost no exceptions. Thus eg, ie, vs, et al, Dr, Mr, MRI, ICU, and hundreds of others contain no periods. The only exceptions are No. (an abbreviation of Numero, Number), to avoid confusion with the word "No"; initials within persons' names (such as "George R. Smith"); and "St." within persons' names when the person prefers it (such as "Emily R. St. Clair") (but not in city names such as St Louis or St Paul).

Acronyms that were originally capitalized (with or without periods) but have since entered the vocabulary as generic words are no longer written with capital letters nor with any periods. Examples are sonar, radar, lidar, laser, snafu, and scuba.

When an abbreviation appears at the end of a sentence, only one period is used: The capital of the United States is Washington, D.C.

In the past, some initialisms were styled with a period after each letter and a space between each pair. For example, U. S., but today this is typically US.

=== Plural ===
There are multiple ways to pluralize an abbreviation. Sometimes this accomplished by adding an apostrophe and an s ('s), as in "two PC's have broken screens". But, some find this confusing since the notation can indicate possessive case. And, this style is deprecated by many style guides. For instance, Kate Turabian, writing about style in academic writings, allows for an apostrophe to form plural acronyms "only when an abbreviation contains internal periods or both capital and lowercase letters". For example, "DVDs" and "URLs" and "Ph.D.'s", while the Modern Language Association explicitly says, "do not use an apostrophe to form the plural of an abbreviation". Also, the American Psychological Association specifically says, "without an apostrophe".

However, the 1999 style guide for The New York Times states that the addition of an apostrophe is necessary when pluralizing all abbreviations, preferring "PC's, TV's and VCR's".

Forming a plural of an initialization without an apostrophe can also be used for a number, or a letter. Examples:

- Runs batted in, RBIs
- The roaring 20s
- Mind your Ps and Qs

For units of measure, the same form is used for both singular and plural. Examples:

- 1 lb or 20 lb
- 1 ft or 16 ft
- 1 min or 45 min

When an abbreviation contains more than one period, Hart's Rules recommends putting the s after the final one. Examples:

- Ph.D.s
- M.Phil.s
- The d.t.s

However, the same plurals may be rendered less formally as:

- PhDs
- MPhils
- The DTs (This is the recommended form in the New Oxford Dictionary for Writers and Editors.)

According to Hart's Rules, an apostrophe may be used in rare cases where clarity calls for it, for example when letters or symbols are referred to as objects.

- The x's of the equation
- Dot the i's and cross the t's

However, the apostrophe can be omitted if the items are set in italics or quotes:

- The xs of the equation
- Dot the "i"s and cross the "t"s

In Latin, and continuing to the derivative forms in European languages as well as English, single-letter abbreviations had the plural being a doubling of the letter for note-taking. Most of these deal with writing and publishing. A few longer abbreviations use this as well.

Singular abbreviation	Word/phrase	Plural abbreviation	Discipline
d.	didot	dd.	typography
f.	following line or page	ff.	notes
F.	folio	Ff.	literature
h.	hand	hh.	horse height
J.	Justice	JJ.	law (job title)
l.	line	ll.	notes
MS	manuscript	MSS	notes
op.	opus (plural: opera)	opp.	notes
p.	page	pp.	notes
Q.	quarto	Qq.	literature
s. (or §)	section	ss. (or §§)	notes
v.	volume	vv.	notes

=== Conventions followed by publications and newspapers ===
==== United States ====
Publications based in the U.S. tend to follow the style guides of The Chicago Manual of Style and the Associated Press. The U.S. government follows a style guide published by the U.S. Government Printing Office. The National Institute of Standards and Technology sets the style for abbreviations of units.

==== United Kingdom ====
Many British publications follow some of these guidelines in abbreviation:

- For the sake of convenience, many British publications, including the BBC and The Guardian, have completely done away with the use of full stops in all abbreviations. These include:
  - Social titles, e.g. Ms or Mr (though these would usually have not had full stops — see above) Capt, Prof, etc.;
  - Two-letter abbreviations for countries ("US", not "U.S.");
  - Abbreviations beyond three letters (full caps for all except initialisms);
  - Words seldom abbreviated with lower case letters ("PR", instead of "p.r.", or "pr")
  - Names ("FW de Klerk", "GB Whiteley", "Park JS"). A notable exception is The Economist which writes "Mr F. W. de Klerk".
  - Scientific units (see Measurements below).
- Acronyms are often referred to with only the first letter of the abbreviation capitalised. For instance, the North Atlantic Treaty Organization can be abbreviated as "Nato" or "NATO", and Severe Acute Respiratory Syndrome as "Sars" or "SARS" (compare with "laser" which has made the full transition to an English word and is rarely capitalised at all).
- Initialisms are always written in capitals; for example the "British Broadcasting Corporation" is abbreviated to "BBC", never "Bbc". An initialism is also an acronym but is not pronounced as a word.
- When abbreviating scientific units, no space is added between the number and unit (100mph, 100m, 10cm, 10°C). (This is contrary to the SI standard; see below.)

==== Miscellaneous and general rules ====
- A doubled letter appears in abbreviations of some Welsh names, as in Welsh the double "l" is a separate sound: "Ll. George" for (British prime minister) David Lloyd George.
- Some titles, such as "Reverend" and "Honourable", are spelt out when preceded by "the", rather than as "Rev." or "Hon." respectively. This is true for most British publications, and some in the United States.
- A repeatedly used abbreviation should be spelt out for identification on its first occurrence in a written or spoken passage. Abbreviations likely to be unfamiliar to many readers should be avoided.

== Measurements: abbreviations or symbols ==
Writers often use shorthand to denote units of measure. Such shorthand can be an abbreviation, such as "in" for "inch" or can be a symbol such as "km" for "kilometre".

In the International System of Units (SI) manual the word "symbol" is used consistently to define the shorthand used to represent the various SI units of measure. The manual also defines the way in which units should be written, the principal rules being:

- The conventions for upper and lower case letters must be observed—for example 1 MW (megawatts) is equal to 1,000,000 watts and 1,000,000,000 mW (milliwatts).
- No periods should be inserted between letters—for example "m.s" (which is an approximation of "m·s", which correctly uses middle dot) is the symbol for "metres multiplied by seconds", but "ms" is the symbol for milliseconds.
- No periods should follow the symbol unless the syntax of the sentence demands otherwise (for example a full stop at the end of a sentence).
- The singular and plural versions of the symbol are identical—not all languages use the letter "s" to denote a plural.

== Syllabic abbreviation ==
A syllabic abbreviation is usually formed from the initial syllables of several words, such as Interpol = International + police. It is a variant of the acronym. Syllabic abbreviations are usually written using lower case, sometimes starting with a capital letter, and are always pronounced as words rather than letter by letter. Syllabic abbreviations should be distinguished from portmanteaus, which combine two words without necessarily taking whole syllables from each.

=== English ===
Syllabic abbreviations are not widely used in English. Some UK government agencies such as Ofcom (Office of Communications) and the former Oftel (Office of Telecommunications) use this style.

New York City has various neighborhoods named by syllabic abbreviation, such as Tribeca (Triangle below Canal Street) and SoHo (South of Houston Street). This usage has spread into other American cities, giving SoMa, San Francisco (South of Market), and LoDo, Denver (Lower Downtown), amongst others. Sections of California are also often colloquially syllabically abbreviated, as in NorCal (Northern California), CenCal (Central California), and SoCal (Southern California). Additionally, in the context of Los Angeles, the syllabic abbreviation SoHo (Southern Hollywood) refers to the southern portion of the Hollywood neighborhood.

Chicago-based electric service provider ComEd is a syllabic abbreviation of Commonwealth and (Thomas) Edison, and the Metra commuter rail is a syllabic abbreviation of Metropolitan and Rail.

Partially syllabic abbreviations are preferred by the US Navy, as they increase readability amidst the large number of initialisms that would otherwise have to fit into the same acronyms. Hence DESRON 6 is used (in the full capital form) to mean "Destroyer Squadron 6", while COMNAVAIRLANT would be "Commander, Naval Air Force (in the) Atlantic".

Syllabic abbreviations are a prominent feature of Newspeak, the fictional language of George Orwell's dystopian novel Nineteen Eighty-Four. The political contractions of Newspeak—Ingsoc (English Socialism), Minitrue (Ministry of Truth), Miniplenty (Ministry of Plenty)—are described by Orwell as similar to real examples of German (see below) and Russian (see below) contractions in the 20th century. The contractions in Newspeak are supposed to have a political function by virtue of their abbreviated structure itself: nice sounding and easily pronounceable, their purpose is to mask all ideological content from the speaker.

A more recent syllabic abbreviation has emerged with the disease COVID-19 (Corona Virus Disease 2019) caused by the Severe acute respiratory syndrome coronavirus 2 (itself frequently abbreviated to SARS-CoV-2, partly an initialism).

=== Albanian ===
In Albanian, syllabic acronyms are sometimes used for composing a person's name, such as Migjeni—an abbreviation from his original name (Millosh Gjergj Nikolla) a famous Albanian poet and writer—or ASDRENI (Aleksander Stavre Drenova), another famous Albanian poet.

Other such names which are used commonly in recent decades are GETOAR, composed from Gegeria + Tosks (representing the two main dialects of the Albanian language, Gegë and Toskë), and Arbanon—which is an alternative way used to describe all Albanian lands.

=== German ===
Syllabic abbreviations were and are common in German; much like acronyms in English, they have a distinctly modern connotation, although contrary to popular belief, many date back to before 1933, if not the end of the Great War. Kriminalpolizei, literally criminal police but idiomatically the Criminal Investigation Department of any German police force, begat KriPo (variously capitalised), and likewise Schutzpolizei (protection police or uniform department) begat SchuPo. Along the same lines, the Swiss Federal Railways' Transit Police—the Transportpolizei—are abbreviated as the TraPo.

With the National Socialist German Workers' Party gaining power came a frenzy of government reorganisation, and with it a series of entirely new syllabic abbreviations. The single national police force amalgamated from the Schutzpolizeien of the various states became the OrPo (Ordnungspolizei, "order police"); the state KriPos together formed the "SiPo" (Sicherheitspolizei, "security police"); and there was also the Gestapo (Geheime Staatspolizei, "secret state police"). Non regime-aligned partially syllabic abbreviations also existed like "Gröfaz" for the self-proclaimed "größter Feldherr aller Zeiten" (greatest military commander of all time), i.e. Hitler. The new order of the German Democratic Republic in the east brought about a conscious denazification, but also a repudiation of earlier turns of phrase in favour of neologisms such as Stasi for Staatssicherheit ("state security", the secret police) and VoPo for Volkspolizei. The phrase politisches Büro, which may be rendered literally as "office of politics" or idiomatically as "political party steering committee", became Politbüro.

Syllabic abbreviations are not only used in politics, however. Many business names, trademarks, and service marks from across Germany are created on the same pattern: for a few examples, there is Aldi, from Theo Albrecht, the name of its founder, followed by discount; Haribo, from Hans Riegel, the name of its founder, followed by Bonn, the town of its head office; and Adidas, from Adolf "Adi" Dassler, the nickname of its founder followed by his surname.

=== Russian ===
Syllabic abbreviations are very common in Russian, Belarusian and Ukrainian. They are often used as names of organizations. Historically, popularization of abbreviations was a way to simplify mass-education in 1920s (see Likbez). The word kolkhoz (kollektívnoye khozyáystvo, collective farm) is another example.

Leninist organisations such as the Comintern (Communist International) and Komsomol (Kommunisticheskii Soyuz Molodyozhi, or "Communist youth union") used Russian language syllabic abbreviations. In the modern Russian language, words like Rosselkhozbank (from Rossiysky selskokhozyaystvenny bank — Russian Agricultural Bank, RusAg) and Minobrnauki (from Ministerstvo obrazovaniya i nauki — Ministry of Education and Science) are still commonly used. In nearby Belarus, there are Beltelecom (Belarus Telecommunication) and Belsat (Belarus Satellite).

=== Spanish ===
Syllabic abbreviations are common in Spanish; examples abound in organization names such as Pemex for Petróleos Mexicanos ("Mexican Petroleums") or Fonafifo for Fondo Nacional de Financimiento Forestal (National Forestry Financing Fund). El Banco Nacional de México, S.A. ("Banamex"), Teléfonos de México, S.A.B. de C.V. ("TELMEX"), Operadora de Cinemas, S.A. de C.V. ("Cinemex")

=== Malay and Indonesian ===
In Southeast Asian languages, especially in Malay languages, abbreviations are common; examples include Petronas (for Petroliam Nasional, "National Petroleum"), its Indonesian equivalent Pertamina (from its original name Perusahaan Pertambangan Minyak dan Gas Bumi Negara, "State Oil and Natural Gas Mining Company"), and Kemenhub (from Kementerian Perhubungan, "Ministry of Transportation").

Malaysian abbreviation often uses letters from each word, while Indonesia usually uses syllables; although some cases do not follow the style. For example, general elections in Malaysian Malay often shortened into PRU (pilihan raya umum) while Indonesian often shortened into pemilu (pemilihan umum). Another example is Ministry of Health in which Malaysian Malay uses KKM (Kementerian Kesihatan Malaysia), compared to Indonesian Kemenkes (Kementerian Kesehatan).

=== Chinese and Japanese kanji ===
East Asian languages whose writing systems use Chinese characters form abbreviations similarly by using key Chinese characters from a term or phrase. For example, in Japanese the term for the United Nations, kokusai rengō (国際連合) is often abbreviated to kokuren (国連). (Such abbreviations are called ryakugo (略語) in Japanese; see also Japanese abbreviated and contracted words). The syllabic abbreviation of kanji words is frequently used for universities: for instance, Tōdai (東大) for Tōkyō daigaku (東京大学, University of Tokyo) and is used similarly in Chinese: Běidà (北大) for Běijīng Dàxué (北京大学, Peking University). Korean universities often follow the same conventions, such as Hongdae (홍대) as short for Hongik Daehakgyo, or Hongik University. The English phrase "Gung ho" originated as a Chinese abbreviation.

== See also ==
- Abbreviation (music) – Abbreviations used in music notation
- Blend word – Word consisting of two words
  - List of portmanteaus
- Clipping (morphology) – Reduction of a word to one of its parts
- Gramogram – Group of letters pronounced as if a word
- List of abbreviations used in medical prescriptions
- List of abbreviations in photography
- Acronym – Abbreviation consisting of initial letters of a phrase
  - List of acronyms
- List of business and finance abbreviations
- List of classical abbreviations
- List of medieval abbreviations
- Neologism – Recent term gaining acceptance
- Numeronym – Number-based word
- RAS syndrome – Redundant use of acronyms
- SMS language – Abbreviated slang used in text messaging
- Three-letter acronym – Abbreviation consisting of three letters
- The abbreviations used in the 1913 edition of Webster's dictionary
- Unicode alias names and abbreviations – Names and aliases of Unicode characters
