= Medefaidrin (Unicode block) =

- Range: U+16E40..U+16E9F (96 code points)
- Plane: SMP
- Scripts: Medefaidrin
- Assigned: 91 code points
- Unused: 5 reserved code points

Unicode version history
- 11.0 (2018): 91 (+91)

Unicode documentation
- Code chart ∣ Web page

Medefaidrin is a Unicode block containing characters for the constructed script Medefaidrin which is used to write the constructed language of the same name. The Medefaidrin language and script were created as a Christian sacred language by an Ibibio congregation in 1930s Nigeria.

== Block ==
Medefaidrin^{[1]}^{[2]} Official Unicode Consortium code chart (PDF)
	0	1	2	3	4	5	6	7	8	9	A	B	C	D	E	F
U+16E4x	𖹀	𖹁	𖹂	𖹃	𖹄	𖹅	𖹆	𖹇	𖹈	𖹉	𖹊	𖹋	𖹌	𖹍	𖹎	𖹏
U+16E5x	𖹐	𖹑	𖹒	𖹓	𖹔	𖹕	𖹖	𖹗	𖹘	𖹙	𖹚	𖹛	𖹜	𖹝	𖹞	𖹟
U+16E6x	𖹠	𖹡	𖹢	𖹣	𖹤	𖹥	𖹦	𖹧	𖹨	𖹩	𖹪	𖹫	𖹬	𖹭	𖹮	𖹯
U+16E7x	𖹰	𖹱	𖹲	𖹳	𖹴	𖹵	𖹶	𖹷	𖹸	𖹹	𖹺	𖹻	𖹼	𖹽	𖹾	𖹿
U+16E8x	𖺀	𖺁	𖺂	𖺃	𖺄	𖺅	𖺆	𖺇	𖺈	𖺉	𖺊	𖺋	𖺌	𖺍	𖺎	𖺏
U+16E9x	𖺐	𖺑	𖺒	𖺓	𖺔	𖺕	𖺖	𖺗	𖺘	𖺙	𖺚					
Notes: 1. As of Unicode version 16.0; 2. Grey areas indicate non-assigned code points

== History ==
The following Unicode-related documents record the purpose and process of defining specific characters in the Medefaidrin block:

Version	Final code points (Note: Proposed code points and characters names may differ from final code points and names)	Count	L2 ID	Document
11.0	U+16E40..16E9A	91	L2/15-149	Anderson, Deborah; Whistler, Ken; McGowan, Rick; Pournader, Roozbeh; Pandey, Anshuman; Glass, Andrew (2015-05-03), "13. Medefaidrin", Recommendations to UTC #143 May 2015 on Script Proposals
11.0	U+16E40..16E9A	91	L2/15-117R2	Rovenchak, Andrij; Gibbon, Dafydd; Ekpenyong, Moses; Urua, Eno-Abasi (2015-07-17), Preliminary proposal for encoding the Medefaidrin (Oberi Okaime) script
11.0	U+16E40..16E9A	91	L2/15-298	Rovenchak, Andrij; Gibbon, Dafydd; Ekpenyong, Moses; Urua, Eno-Abasi (2015-10-01), Proposal for encoding the Medefaidrin (Oberi Okaime) script in the SMP
11.0	U+16E40..16E9A	91	L2/15-312	Anderson, Deborah; Whistler, Ken; McGowan, Rick; Pournader, Roozbeh; Glass, Andrew; Iancu, Laurențiu (2015-11-01), "6. Medefaidrin", Recommendations to UTC #145 November 2015 on Script Proposals
11.0	U+16E40..16E9A	91	L2/16-020	Rovenchak, Andrij; Gibbon, Dafydd; Ekpenyong, Moses; Urua, Eno-Abasi (2016-01-13), Proposal for encoding the Medefaidrin (Oberi Okaime) script in the SMP
11.0	U+16E40..16E9A	91	L2/16-037	Anderson, Deborah; Whistler, Ken; McGowan, Rick; Pournader, Roozbeh; Glass, Andrew; Iancu, Laurențiu (2016-01-22), "12. Medefaidrin", Recommendations to UTC #146 January 2016 on Script Proposals
11.0	U+16E40..16E9A	91	L2/16-101R	Rovenchak, Andrij; Gibbon, Dafydd; Ekpenyong, Moses; Urua, Eno-Abasi (2016-04-18), Proposal for encoding the Medefaidrin (Oberi Okaime) script in the SMP
11.0	U+16E40..16E9A	91	L2/16-156	Anderson, Deborah; Whistler, Ken; Pournader, Roozbeh; Glass, Andrew; Iancu, Laurențiu (2016-05-06), "6. Medefaidrin", Recommendations to UTC #147 May 2016 on Script Proposals
11.0	U+16E40..16E9A	91	L2/16-121	Moore, Lisa (2016-05-20), "C.15", UTC #147 Minutes
11.0	U+16E40..16E9A	91	L2/18-142	Ekpenyong, Moses; et al. (2018-04-11), Medefaidrin corrections for 11.0
11.0	U+16E40..16E9A	91	L2/18-168	Anderson, Deborah; Whistler, Ken; Pournader, Roozbeh; Moore, Lisa; Liang, Hai; Chapman, Chris; Cook, Richard (2018-04-28), "5. Medefaidrin", Recommendations to UTC #155 April-May 2018 on Script Proposals
11.0	U+16E40..16E9A	91	L2/18-115	Moore, Lisa (2018-05-09), "C.15", UTC #155 Minutes
