= Standards related to Unicode =

There are several standards related to Unicode. Some are national standards that provide translated versions of sections of Unicode. Some provide guidance on using Unicode for languages frequently used in a region. Some are maintained to be in sync with Unicode.

Third-party standards related to Unicode
Name	Organization	Notes
BSI ISO/IEC 10646	British Standards Institution	UK adoption of ISO/IEC 10646
DIN 91379	Deutsches Institut für Normung	Unicode subset for Europe
CNS 14649	Chinese National Standards (Taiwan)	
GB 13000	Chinese government standard	
GB 18030	Chinese government standard	Repertoire synchronized with ISO/IEC 10646
INCITS/ISO/IEC 10646	International Committee for Information Technology Standards	US adoption of ISO/IEC 10646
ISIRI 6219	Institute of Standards and Industrial Research of Iran	
ISO/IEC 10646	International Organization for Standardization and International Electrotechnical Commission	Repertoire synchronized with Unicode
JIS X 0221	Japanese Industrial Standards	
KS X 1005	South Korean standard	Formerly KS C 5700; abolished in 2006
TCVN 6909	Vietnam standard	
