= Unicode Consortium =

Organization maintaining the Unicode Standard

- Unicode, Inc.
- Formation: January 3, 1991; 35 years ago
- Founders: Joe Becker; Lee Collins; Mark Davis
- Founded at: California, US
- Type: Non-profit consortium
- Tax ID no.: 77-0269756
- Legal status: 501(c)(3) California nonprofit benefit corporation
- Purpose: "To develop, extend and promote use of various standards, data, and open source software libraries which specify the representation of text in modern software[,] ... allowing data to be shared across multiple platforms, languages and countries without corruption"
- Coordinates: 37.411759°N 122.070958°W
- Key people: Toral Cowieson (CEO); Mark Davis (CTO & Cofounder; CLDR-TC Chair); Anne Gundelfinger (Vice President and General Counsel); Greg Welch (Vice President of Marketing); Iris Orriss (Treasurer); Ayman Aldahleh (Secretary)
- Revenue: $467,576 (2018)
- Expenses: $470,257 (2018)
- Employees: 3 (2018)
- Volunteers: 10 (2018)
- Website: home.unicode.org

The Unicode Consortium (legally Unicode, Inc.) is a 501(c)(3) non-profit organization incorporated and based in Mountain View, California, U.S. Its primary purpose is to maintain and publish the Unicode Standard which was developed with the intention of replacing existing character encoding schemes that are limited in size and scope, and are incompatible with multilingual environments.

Unicode's success at unifying character sets has led to its widespread adoption in the internationalization and localization of software. The standard has been implemented in many technologies, including XML, the Java programming language, Swift, and modern operating systems.

Members are usually but not limited to computer software and hardware companies with an interest in text-processing standards, including Adobe, Apple, Meta, Google, Microsoft, and Salesforce. Technical decisions relating to the Unicode Standard are made by the Unicode Technical Committee (UTC).

== Founding ==
The project to develop a universal character encoding scheme called Unicode was initiated in 1987 by Joe Becker, Lee Collins, and Mark Davis. The Unicode Consortium was incorporated in California on January 3, 1991, with the stated aim to develop, extend, and promote the use of the Unicode Standard. Mark Davis was the president of the Unicode Consortium from when the Consortium was incorporated in 1991 until 2023, when he changed roles to CTO.

== Work ==
Our goal is to make sure that all of the text on computers for every language in the world is represented but we get a lot more attention for emojis than for the fact that you can type Chinese on your phone and have it work with another phone.

— Unicode Consortium co-founder and CTO, Mark Davis

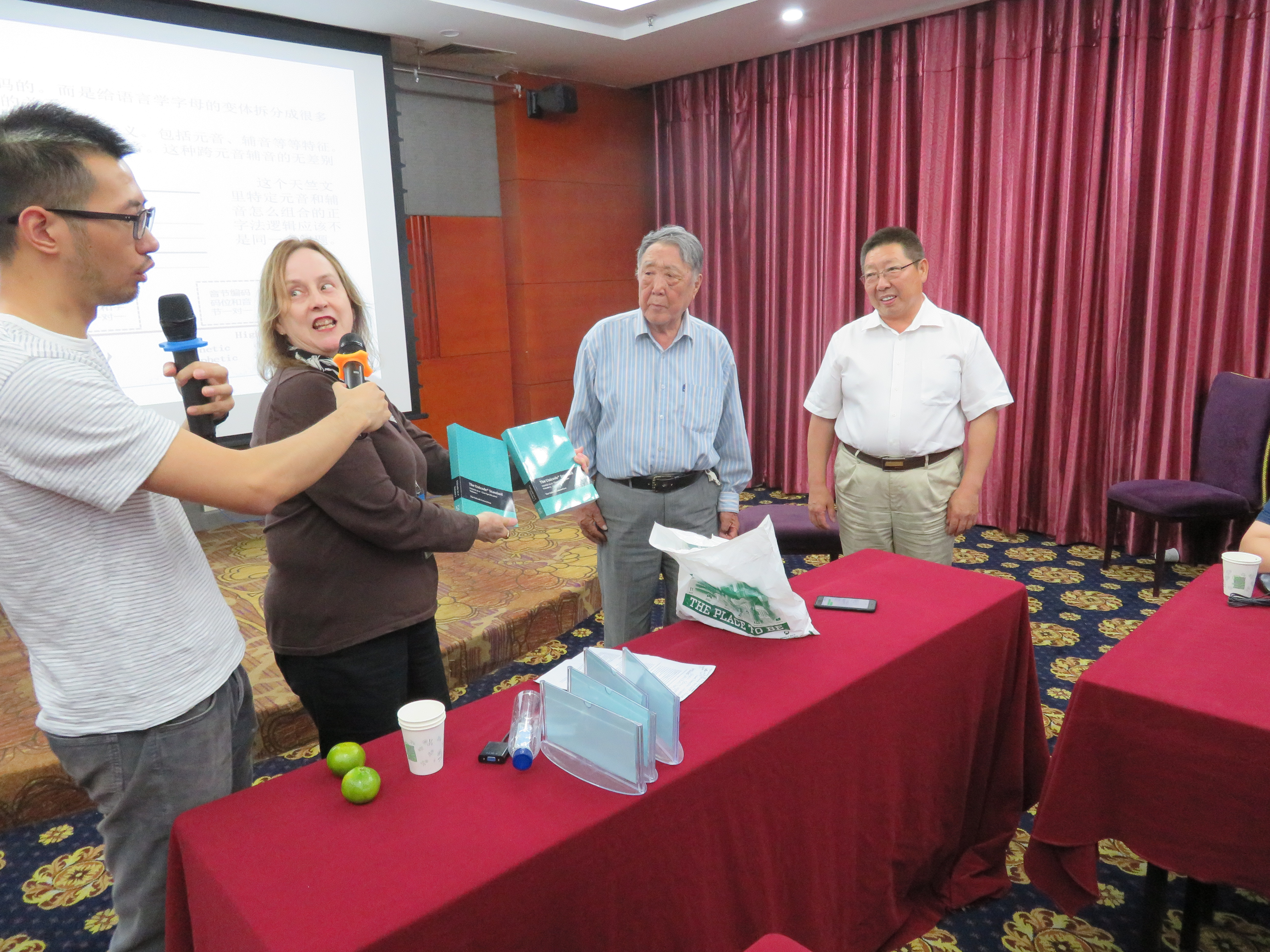
Lisa Moore, vice president of the Unicode Consortium, presenting Choijinzhab and Nashunwuritu with copies of the Unicode Standard at a meeting of ISO/IEC JTC 1/SC 2 in Hohhot, Inner Mongolia, in 2017

The Unicode Consortium cooperates with many standards development organizations, including ISO/IEC JTC 1/SC 2 and W3C. While Unicode is often considered equivalent to ISO/IEC 10646, and the character sets are essentially identical, the Unicode standard imposes additional restrictions on implementations that ISO/IEC 10646 does not. Apart from The Unicode Standard (TUS) and its annexes (UAX), the Unicode Consortium also maintains the CLDR, collaborated with the IETF on IDNA, and publishes related standards (UTS), reports (UTR), and utilities.

The group selects the emoji icons used by the world's smartphones, based on submissions from individuals and organizations who present their case with evidence for why each one is needed.

=== Unicode Technical Committee ===
The Unicode Technical Committee (UTC) meets quarterly to decide whether new characters will be encoded. A quorum of half of the Consortium's full members is required.

As of October 12, 2026, there are eight full members: Adobe, Airbnb, Apple, Google, Meta, Microsoft, Salesforce and Translated.

The UTC accepts documents from any organization or individual, whether they are members of the Unicode Consortium or not. The UTC holds its meetings behind closed doors. As of July 2020, the UTC rules on both emoji and script proposals at the same meeting.

Due to the COVID-19 pandemic's effect on travel, the meetings, which used to be hosted on by various companies for free, were in 2020 held online via Zoom, although the discussions remain confidential.

The UTC prefers to work by consensus, but on particularly contentious issues, votes may be necessary. After it meets, the UTC releases a public statement on each proposal it considered. Due to the volume of proposals, various working groups, such as the Script Encoding Working Group and the Emoji Standard and Research Working Group, exist to submit recommendations to the full UTC en banc. The UTC is under no obligation to heed these recommendations, although in practice it usually does.

== Publications ==
The Unicode Consortium maintains a History of Unicode Release and Publication Dates.

Publications include:

- The Unicode Standard, Version 12.0. Web publication. March 2019. ISBN 978-1-936213-22-1.
- The Unicode Standard, Version 5.0 (5th ed.). Addison-Wesley. October 2006. ISBN 978-0-321-48091-0.
- The Unicode Standard, Version 4.0. Addison-Wesley. August 2003. ISBN 978-0-321-18578-5.

== See also ==
- Comparison of Unicode encodings
- Universal Character Set characters
- Universal Coded Character Set
