= Unicode alias names and abbreviations =

Names and aliases of Unicode characters

In Unicode, characters can have a unique name. A character can also have one or more alias names. An alias name can be an abbreviation, a C0 or C1 control name, a correction, an alternate name or a figment. An alias too is unique over all names and aliases, and therefore identifying.

== Background ==
The formal, primary Unicode name is unique over all names, only uses certain characters & format, and is guaranteed never to change. The formal name consists of characters A–Z (uppercase), 0–9, " " (space), and "-" (hyphen). Next to this name, a character can have one or more formal (normative) alias names. Such an alias name also follows the rules of a name: characters used (A-Z, -, 0-9, <space>) and not used (a-z, %, $, etc.). Alias names are also unique in the full name set (that is, all names and alias names are all unique in their combined set). Alias names are formally described in the Unicode Standard. In this sense, an abbreviation is also considered a Unicode name.

== Reason to add an alias ==
There are five possible reasons to assign an alias name to a code point. A character can have multiple aliases: for example U+0008 <control-0008> has control alias BACKSPACE and abbreviation alias BS.

1. Abbreviation
Commonly occurring abbreviations (or acronyms) for control codes, format characters, spaces, and variation selectors.
There are 354 such aliases, including 256 aliases for variant selectors (VS-1 ... VS-256).
For example, U+00A0 NO-BREAK SPACE has alias NBSP.
Presentation: in the code charts, the abbreviation is shown in a dashed box: NBSP.
2. Control
ISO 6429 names for C0 and C1 control functions and similar commonly occurring names, are added as an alias to the character.
There are 84 such aliases.
For example, U+0008 <control-0008> has alias BACKSPACE.
Presentation: Control characters do not have a primary name, they are labeled like <control-0008>. Its alias name like BACKSPACE is used in the chart documentation, but never as a primary name. This prevents unintended (automated) replacement by the actual, disrupting control character. For example, using alias name BEL in line would be replaced by U+0007 <control-0007> , triggering the bell sound.
3. Correction
This is a correction for a "serious problem" in the primary character name, usually an error.
There are 39 such aliases.
For example, U+2118 ℘ SCRIPT CAPITAL P is actually a lowercase p, and so is given alias name ※ WEIERSTRASS ELLIPTIC FUNCTION: "actually this has the form of a lowercase calligraphic p, despite its name, and through the alias the correct spelling is added."
Presentation: A corrected name is preceded by symbol ※ (the reference mark).
4. Alternate
For widely used alternate name for a character.
There is 1 such alias.
Example: U+FEFF ZERO WIDTH NO-BREAK SPACE has alternate BYTE ORDER MARK.
Presentation: listed in character charts description.
5. Figment
Several documented labels for C1 control code points which were never actually approved in any standard (figment = feigned, in fiction).
There are 3 such aliases.
For example, U+0099 <control-0099> has figment alias SINGLE GRAPHIC CHARACTER INTRODUCER. This name is an architectural concept from early drafts of ISO/IEC 10646-1, but it was never approved and standardized.
Presentation: These figment abbreviations are not published in Standard; the chart shows "XXX" for each informally, that is: not a unique or identifying abbreviation.

== List of aliases ==
| Code point | HTML decimal | Name or <label> | Alias | | Reason | Chart | Note |
| Code point | HTML decimal | Name or <label> | Abbr | Name | Reason | Chart | Note |
|---|---|---|---|---|---|---|---|
| U+0000 | &#0; | <control-0000> | NUL | NULL | Control | C0 Controls and Basic Latin (pdf) | |
| U+0001 | &#1; | <control-0001> | SOH | START OF HEADING | Control | C0 Controls and Basic Latin (pdf) | |
| U+0002 | &#2; | <control-0002> | STX | START OF TEXT | Control | C0 Controls and Basic Latin (pdf) | |
| U+0003 | &#3; | <control-0003> | ETX | END OF TEXT | Control | C0 Controls and Basic Latin (pdf) | |
| U+0004 | &#4; | <control-0004> | EOT | END OF TRANSMISSION | Control | C0 Controls and Basic Latin (pdf) | |
| U+0005 | &#5; | <control-0005> | ENQ | ENQUIRY | Control | C0 Controls and Basic Latin (pdf) | |
| U+0006 | &#6; | <control-0006> | ACK | ACKNOWLEDGE | Control | C0 Controls and Basic Latin (pdf) | |
| U+0007 | &#7; | <control-0007> | BEL | ALERT | Control | C0 Controls and Basic Latin (pdf) | |
| U+0008 | &#8; | <control-0008> | BS | BACKSPACE | Control | C0 Controls and Basic Latin (pdf) | |
| U+0009 | &Tab; &#9; | <control-0009> | TAB | CHARACTER TABULATION | Control | C0 Controls and Basic Latin (pdf) | |
| U+0009 | &Tab; &#9; | <control-0009> | HT | HORIZONTAL TABULATION | Control | C0 Controls and Basic Latin (pdf) | |
| U+000A | &#10; | <control-000A> | LF | LINE FEED | Control | C0 Controls and Basic Latin (pdf) | |
| U+000A | &#10; | <control-000A> | NL | NEW LINE | Control | C0 Controls and Basic Latin (pdf) | |
| U+000A | &#10; | <control-000A> | EOL | END OF LINE | Control | C0 Controls and Basic Latin (pdf) | |
| U+000B | &#11; | <control-000B> | | LINE TABULATION | Control | C0 Controls and Basic Latin (pdf) | |
| U+000B | &#11; | <control-000B> | VT | VERTICAL TABULATION | Control | C0 Controls and Basic Latin (pdf) | |
| U+000C | &#12; | <control-000C> | FF | FORM FEED | Control | C0 Controls and Basic Latin (pdf) | |
| U+000D | &#13; | <control-000D> | CR | CARRIAGE RETURN | Control | C0 Controls and Basic Latin (pdf) | |
| U+000E | &#14; | <control-000E> | SO | SHIFT OUT | Control | C0 Controls and Basic Latin (pdf) | |
| U+000E | &#14; | <control-000E> | | LOCKING-SHIFT ONE | Control | C0 Controls and Basic Latin (pdf) | |
| U+000F | &#15; | <control-000F> | SI | SHIFT IN | Control | C0 Controls and Basic Latin (pdf) | |
| U+000F | &#15; | <control-000F> | | LOCKING-SHIFT ZERO | Control | C0 Controls and Basic Latin (pdf) | |
| U+0010 | &#16; | <control-0010> | DLE | DATA LINK ESCAPE | Control | C0 Controls and Basic Latin (pdf) | |
| U+0011 | &#17; | <control-0011> | DC1 | DEVICE CONTROL ONE | Control | C0 Controls and Basic Latin (pdf) | |
| U+0012 | &#18; | <control-0012> | DC2 | DEVICE CONTROL TWO | Control | C0 Controls and Basic Latin (pdf) | |
| U+0013 | &#19; | <control-0013> | DC3 | DEVICE CONTROL THREE | Control | C0 Controls and Basic Latin (pdf) | |
| U+0014 | &#20; | <control-0014> | DC4 | DEVICE CONTROL FOUR | Control | C0 Controls and Basic Latin (pdf) | |
| U+0015 | &#21; | <control-0015> | NAK | NEGATIVE ACKNOWLEDGE | Control | C0 Controls and Basic Latin (pdf) | |
| U+0016 | &#22; | <control-0016> | SYN | SYNCHRONOUS IDLE | Control | C0 Controls and Basic Latin (pdf) | |
| U+0017 | &#23; | <control-0017> | ETB | END OF TRANSMISSION BLOCK | Control | C0 Controls and Basic Latin (pdf) | |
| U+0018 | &#24; | <control-0018> | CAN | CANCEL | Control | C0 Controls and Basic Latin (pdf) | |
| U+0019 | &#25; | <control-0019> | EOM | END OF MEDIUM | Control | C0 Controls and Basic Latin (pdf) | |
| U+0019 | &#25; | <control-0019> | EM | | Abbreviation | C0 Controls and Basic Latin (pdf) | added in version 15.0 |
| U+001A | &#26; | <control-001A> | SUB | SUBSTITUTE | Control | C0 Controls and Basic Latin (pdf) | |
| U+001B | &#27; | <control-001B> | ESC | ESCAPE | Control | C0 Controls and Basic Latin (pdf) | |
| U+001C | &#28; | <control-001C> | | INFORMATION SEPARATOR FOUR | Control | C0 Controls and Basic Latin (pdf) | |
| U+001C | &#28; | <control-001C> | FS | FILE SEPARATOR | Control | C0 Controls and Basic Latin (pdf) | |
| U+001D | &#29; | <control-001D> | | INFORMATION SEPARATOR THREE | Control | C0 Controls and Basic Latin (pdf) | |
| U+001D | &#29; | <control-001D> | GS | GROUP SEPARATOR | Control | C0 Controls and Basic Latin (pdf) | |
| U+001E | &#30; | <control-001E> | | INFORMATION SEPARATOR TWO | Control | C0 Controls and Basic Latin (pdf) | |
| U+001E | &#30; | <control-001E> | RS | RECORD SEPARATOR | Control | C0 Controls and Basic Latin (pdf) | |
| U+001F | &#31; | <control-001F> | | INFORMATION SEPARATOR ONE | Control | C0 Controls and Basic Latin (pdf) | |
| U+001F | &#31; | <control-001F> | US | UNIT SEPARATOR | Control | C0 Controls and Basic Latin (pdf) | |
| U+0020 | &#32; | SPACE | SP | | Abbreviation | C0 Controls and Basic Latin (pdf) | |
| U+007F | &#127; | <control-007F> | DEL | DELETE | Control | C0 Controls and Basic Latin (pdf) | |
| U+0080 | &#128; | <control-0080> | PAD | PADDING CHARACTER | Figment | C1 Controls and Latin-1 Supplement (pdf) | Aliases are not widely published by Unicode; chart shows non-unique XXX |
| U+0081 | &#129; | <control-0081> | HOP | HIGH OCTET PRESET | Figment | C1 Controls and Latin-1 Supplement (pdf) | Aliases are not widely published by Unicode; chart shows non-unique XXX |
| U+0082 | &#130; | <control-0082> | BPH | BREAK PERMITTED HERE | Control | C1 Controls and Latin-1 Supplement (pdf) | |
| U+0083 | &#131; | <control-0083> | NBH | NO BREAK HERE | Control | C1 Controls and Latin-1 Supplement (pdf) | |
| U+0084 | &#132; | <control-0084> | IND | INDEX | Control | C1 Controls and Latin-1 Supplement (pdf) | |
| U+0085 | &#133; | <control-0085> | NEL | NEXT LINE | Control | C1 Controls and Latin-1 Supplement (pdf) | |
| U+0086 | &#134; | <control-0086> | SSA | START OF SELECTED AREA | Control | C1 Controls and Latin-1 Supplement (pdf) | |
| U+0087 | &#135; | <control-0087> | ESA | END OF SELECTED AREA | Control | C1 Controls and Latin-1 Supplement (pdf) | |
| U+0088 | &#136; | <control-0088> | | CHARACTER TABULATION SET | Control | C1 Controls and Latin-1 Supplement (pdf) | |
| U+0088 | &#136; | <control-0088> | HTS | HORIZONTAL TABULATION SET | Control | C1 Controls and Latin-1 Supplement (pdf) | |
| U+0089 | &#137; | <control-0089> | | CHARACTER TABULATION WITH JUSTIFICATION | Control | C1 Controls and Latin-1 Supplement (pdf) | |
| U+0089 | &#137; | <control-0089> | HTJ | HORIZONTAL TABULATION WITH JUSTIFICATION | Control | C1 Controls and Latin-1 Supplement (pdf) | |
| U+008A | &#138; | <control-008A> | | LINE TABULATION SET | Control | C1 Controls and Latin-1 Supplement (pdf) | |
| U+008A | &#138; | <control-008A> | VTS | VERTICAL TABULATION SET | Control | C1 Controls and Latin-1 Supplement (pdf) | |
| U+008B | &#139; | <control-008B> | | PARTIAL LINE FORWARD | Control | C1 Controls and Latin-1 Supplement (pdf) | |
| U+008B | &#139; | <control-008B> | PLD | PARTIAL LINE DOWN | Control | C1 Controls and Latin-1 Supplement (pdf) | |
| U+008C | &#140; | <control-008C> | | PARTIAL LINE BACKWARD | Control | C1 Controls and Latin-1 Supplement (pdf) | |
| U+008C | &#140; | <control-008C> | PLU | PARTIAL LINE UP | Control | C1 Controls and Latin-1 Supplement (pdf) | |
| U+008D | &#141; | <control-008D> | | REVERSE LINE FEED | Control | C1 Controls and Latin-1 Supplement (pdf) | |
| U+008D | &#141; | <control-008D> | RI | REVERSE INDEX | Control | C1 Controls and Latin-1 Supplement (pdf) | |
| U+008E | &#142; | <control-008E> | | SINGLE SHIFT TWO | Control | C1 Controls and Latin-1 Supplement (pdf) | |
| U+008E | &#142; | <control-008E> | SS2 | SINGLE-SHIFT-2 | Control | C1 Controls and Latin-1 Supplement (pdf) | |
| U+008F | &#143; | <control-008F> | | SINGLE SHIFT THREE | Control | C1 Controls and Latin-1 Supplement (pdf) | |
| U+008F | &#143; | <control-008F> | SS3 | SINGLE-SHIFT-3 | Control | C1 Controls and Latin-1 Supplement (pdf) | |
| U+0090 | &#144; | <control-0090> | DCS | DEVICE CONTROL STRING | Control | C1 Controls and Latin-1 Supplement (pdf) | |
| U+0091 | &#145; | <control-0091> | | PRIVATE USE ONE | Control | C1 Controls and Latin-1 Supplement (pdf) | |
| U+0091 | &#145; | <control-0091> | PU1 | PRIVATE USE-1 | Control | C1 Controls and Latin-1 Supplement (pdf) | |
| U+0092 | &#146; | <control-0092> | | PRIVATE USE TWO | Control | C1 Controls and Latin-1 Supplement (pdf) | |
| U+0092 | &#146; | <control-0092> | PU2 | PRIVATE USE-2 | Control | C1 Controls and Latin-1 Supplement (pdf) | |
| U+0093 | &#147; | <control-0093> | STS | SET TRANSMIT STATE | Control | C1 Controls and Latin-1 Supplement (pdf) | |
| U+0094 | &#148; | <control-0094> | CCH | CANCEL CHARACTER | Control | C1 Controls and Latin-1 Supplement (pdf) | |
| U+0095 | &#149; | <control-0095> | MW | MESSAGE WAITING | Control | C1 Controls and Latin-1 Supplement (pdf) | |
| U+0096 | &#150; | <control-0096> | | START OF GUARDED AREA | Control | C1 Controls and Latin-1 Supplement (pdf) | |
| U+0096 | &#150; | <control-0096> | SPA | START OF PROTECTED AREA | Control | C1 Controls and Latin-1 Supplement (pdf) | |
| U+0097 | &#151; | <control-0097> | | END OF GUARDED AREA | Control | C1 Controls and Latin-1 Supplement (pdf) | |
| U+0097 | &#151; | <control-0097> | EPA | END OF PROTECTED AREA | Control | C1 Controls and Latin-1 Supplement (pdf) | |
| U+0098 | &#152; | <control-0098> | SOS | START OF STRING | Control | C1 Controls and Latin-1 Supplement (pdf) | |
| U+0099 | &#153; | <control-0099> | SGC | SINGLE GRAPHIC CHARACTER INTRODUCER | Figment | C1 Controls and Latin-1 Supplement (pdf) | Aliases are not widely published by Unicode; chart shows non-unique XXX |
| U+009A | &#154; | <control-009A> | SCI | SINGLE CHARACTER INTRODUCER | Control | C1 Controls and Latin-1 Supplement (pdf) | |
| U+009B | &#155; | <control-009B> | CSI | CONTROL SEQUENCE INTRODUCER | Control | C1 Controls and Latin-1 Supplement (pdf) | |
| U+009C | &#156; | <control-009C> | ST | STRING TERMINATOR | Control | C1 Controls and Latin-1 Supplement (pdf) | |
| U+009D | &#157; | <control-009D> | OSC | OPERATING SYSTEM COMMAND | Control | C1 Controls and Latin-1 Supplement (pdf) | |
| U+009E | &#158; | <control-009E> | PM | PRIVACY MESSAGE | Control | C1 Controls and Latin-1 Supplement (pdf) | |
| U+009F | &#159; | <control-009F> | APC | APPLICATION PROGRAM COMMAND | Control | C1 Controls and Latin-1 Supplement (pdf) | |
| U+00A0 | &nbsp; &NonBreakingSpace; &#160; | NO-BREAK SPACE | NBSP | | Abbreviation | C1 Controls and Latin-1 Supplement (pdf) | |
| U+00AD | &shy; &#173; | SOFT HYPHEN | SHY | | Abbreviation | C1 Controls and Latin-1 Supplement (pdf) | |
| U+01A2 | &#418; | LATIN CAPITAL LETTER OI | | LATIN CAPITAL LETTER GHA | ※ Correction | Latin Extended-B (pdf) | |
| U+01A3 | &#419; | LATIN SMALL LETTER OI | | LATIN SMALL LETTER GHA | ※ Correction | Latin Extended-B (pdf) | |
| U+034F | &#847; | COMBINING GRAPHEME JOINER | CGJ | | Abbreviation | Combining Diacritical Marks (pdf) | The name of this character is misleading; it does not actually join graphemes |
| U+0616 | &#1558; | ARABIC SMALL HIGH LIGATURE ALEF WITH LAM WITH YEH | | ARABIC SMALL HIGH LIGATURE ALEF WITH YEH BARREE | ※ Correction | Arabic | added in version 15.0 |
| U+061C | &#1564; | ARABIC LETTER MARK | ALM | | Abbreviation | Arabic (pdf) | See RLM |
| U+0709 | &#1801; | SYRIAC SUBLINEAR COLON SKEWED RIGHT | | SYRIAC SUBLINEAR COLON SKEWED LEFT | ※ Correction | Syriac (pdf) | |
| U+0CDE | &#3294; | KANNADA LETTER FA | | KANNADA LETTER LLLA | ※ Correction | Kannada (pdf) | |
| U+0E9D | &#3741; | LAO LETTER FO TAM | | LAO LETTER FO FON | ※ Correction | Lao (pdf) | |
| U+0E9F | &#3743; | LAO LETTER FO SUNG | | LAO LETTER FO FAY | ※ Correction | Lao (pdf) | |
| U+0EA3 | &#3747; | LAO LETTER LO LING | | LAO LETTER RO | ※ Correction | Lao (pdf) | |
| U+0EA5 | &#3749; | LAO LETTER LO LOOT | | LAO LETTER LO | ※ Correction | Lao (pdf) | |
| U+0FD0 | &#4048; | TIBETAN MARK BSKA- SHOG GI MGO RGYAN | | TIBETAN MARK BKA- SHOG GI MGO RGYAN | ※ Correction | Tibetan (pdf) | |
| U+11EC | &#4588; | HANGUL JONGSEONG IEUNG-KIYEOK | | HANGUL JONGSEONG YESIEUNG-KIYEOK | ※ Correction | Hangul Jamo (pdf) | |
| U+11ED | &#4589; | HANGUL JONGSEONG IEUNG-SSANGKIYEOK | | HANGUL JONGSEONG YESIEUNG-SSANGKIYEOK | ※ Correction | Hangul Jamo (pdf) | |
| U+11EE | &#4590; | HANGUL JONGSEONG SSANGIEUNG | | HANGUL JONGSEONG SSANGYESIEUNG | ※ Correction | Hangul Jamo (pdf) | |
| U+11EF | &#4591; | HANGUL JONGSEONG IEUNG-KHIEUKH | | HANGUL JONGSEONG YESIEUNG-KHIEUKH | ※ Correction | Hangul Jamo (pdf) | |
| U+180B | &#6155; | MONGOLIAN FREE VARIATION SELECTOR ONE | FVS1 | | Abbreviation | Mongolian (pdf) | |
| U+180C | &#6156; | MONGOLIAN FREE VARIATION SELECTOR TWO | FVS2 | | Abbreviation | Mongolian (pdf) | |
| U+180D | &#6157; | MONGOLIAN FREE VARIATION SELECTOR THREE | FVS3 | | Abbreviation | Mongolian (pdf) | |
| U+180E | &#6158; | MONGOLIAN VOWEL SEPARATOR | MVS | | Abbreviation | Mongolian (pdf) | |
| U+180F | &#6159; | MONGOLIAN FREE VARIATION SELECTOR FOUR | FVS4 | | Abbreviation | Mongolian (pdf) | |
| U+1BBD | &#7101; | SUNDANESE LETTER BHA | | SUNDANESE LETTER ARCHAIC I | ※ Correction | Sudanese (pdf) | added in version 15.0 |
| U+200B | &NegativeMediumSpace; &NegativeThickSpace; &NegativeThinSpace; &NegativeVeryThinSpace; &ZeroWidthSpace; &#8203; | ZERO WIDTH SPACE | ZWSP | | Abbreviation | General Punctuation (pdf) | |
| U+200C | &zwnj; &#8204; | ZERO WIDTH NON-JOINER | ZWNJ | | Abbreviation | General Punctuation (pdf) | |
| U+200D | &zwj; &#8205; | ZERO WIDTH JOINER | ZWJ | | Abbreviation | General Punctuation (pdf) | |
| U+200E | &lrm; &#8206; | LEFT-TO-RIGHT MARK | LRM | | Abbreviation | General Punctuation (pdf) | |
| U+200F | &rlm; &#8207; | RIGHT-TO-LEFT MARK | RLM | | Abbreviation | General Punctuation (pdf) | |
| U+202A | &#8234; | LEFT-TO-RIGHT EMBEDDING | LRE | | Abbreviation | General Punctuation (pdf) | |
| U+202B | &#8235; | RIGHT-TO-LEFT EMBEDDING | RLE | | Abbreviation | General Punctuation (pdf) | |
| U+202C | &#8236; | POP DIRECTIONAL FORMATTING | PDF | | Abbreviation | General Punctuation (pdf) | |
| U+202D | &#8237; | LEFT-TO-RIGHT OVERRIDE | LRO | | Abbreviation | General Punctuation (pdf) | |
| U+202E | &#8238; | RIGHT-TO-LEFT OVERRIDE | RLO | | Abbreviation | General Punctuation (pdf) | |
| U+202F | &#8239; | NARROW NO-BREAK SPACE | NNBSP | | Abbreviation | General Punctuation (pdf) | |
| U+205F | &MediumSpace; &#8287; | MEDIUM MATHEMATICAL SPACE | MMSP | | Abbreviation | General Punctuation (pdf) | |
| U+2060 | &NoBreak; &#8288; | WORD JOINER | WJ | | Abbreviation | General Punctuation (pdf) | |
| U+2066 | &#8294; | LEFT-TO-RIGHT ISOLATE | LRI | | Abbreviation | General Punctuation (pdf) | |
| U+2067 | &#8295; | RIGHT-TO-LEFT ISOLATE | RLI | | Abbreviation | General Punctuation (pdf) | |
| U+2068 | &#8296; | FIRST STRONG ISOLATE | FSI | | Abbreviation | General Punctuation (pdf) | |
| U+2069 | &#8297; | POP DIRECTIONAL ISOLATE | PDI | | Abbreviation | General Punctuation (pdf) | |
| U+2118 | &weierp; &wp; &#8472; | SCRIPT CAPITAL P | | WEIERSTRASS ELLIPTIC FUNCTION | ※ Correction | Letterlike Symbols (pdf) | |
| U+2448 | &#9288; | OCR DASH | | MICR ON US SYMBOL | ※ Correction | Optical Character Recognition (pdf) | |
| U+2449 | &#9289; | OCR CUSTOMER ACCOUNT NUMBER | | MICR DASH SYMBOL | ※ Correction | Optical Character Recognition (pdf) | |
| U+2B7A | &#11130; | LEFTWARDS TRIANGLE-HEADED ARROW WITH DOUBLE HORIZONTAL STROKE | | LEFTWARDS TRIANGLE-HEADED ARROW WITH DOUBLE VERTICAL STROKE | ※ Correction | Miscellaneous Symbols and Arrows (pdf) | |
| U+2B7C | &#11132; | RIGHTWARDS TRIANGLE-HEADED ARROW WITH DOUBLE HORIZONTAL STROKE | | RIGHTWARDS TRIANGLE-HEADED ARROW WITH DOUBLE VERTICAL STROKE | ※ Correction | Miscellaneous Symbols and Arrows (pdf) | |
| U+A015 | &#40981; | YI SYLLABLE WU | | YI SYLLABLE ITERATION MARK | ※ Correction | Yi Syllables (pdf) | |
| U+AA6E | &#43630; | MYANMAR LETTER KHAMTI HHA | | MYANMAR LETTER KHAMTI LLA | ※ Correction | Myanmar Extended-A (pdf) | |
| U+FE00... U+FE0F | &#65024;... &#65039; | VARIATION SELECTOR-1... VARIATION SELECTOR-16 | VS1... VS16 | | Abbreviation | Variation Selectors (pdf) | |
| U+FE00... U+FE0F | &#65024;... &#65039; | VARIATION SELECTOR-1... VARIATION SELECTOR-16 | VS1... VS16 | | (16 code points) | Variation Selectors (pdf) | |
| U+FE00... U+FE0F | &#65024;... &#65039; | VARIATION SELECTOR-1... VARIATION SELECTOR-16 | VS1... VS16 | | Abbreviation | Variation Selectors (pdf) | |
| U+FE18 | &#65048; | PRESENTATION FORM FOR VERTICAL RIGHT WHITE LENTICULAR BRAKCET | | PRESENTATION FORM FOR VERTICAL RIGHT WHITE LENTICULAR BRACKET | ※ Correction | Vertical Forms (pdf) | |
| U+FEFF | &#65279; | ZERO WIDTH NO-BREAK SPACE | BOM | BYTE ORDER MARK | Alternate | Arabic Presentation Forms-B (pdf) | |
| U+FEFF | &#65279; | ZERO WIDTH NO-BREAK SPACE | ZWNBSP | | Abbreviation | Arabic Presentation Forms-B (pdf) | |
| U+122D4 | &#74452; | CUNEIFORM SIGN SHIR TENU | | CUNEIFORM SIGN NU11 TENU | ※ Correction | Cuneiform (pdf) | |
| U+122D5 | &#74453; | CUNEIFORM SIGN SHIR OVER SHIR BUR OVER BUR | | CUNEIFORM SIGN NU11 OVER NU11 BUR OVER BUR | ※ Correction | Cuneiform (pdf) | |
| U+12327 | &#74535; | CUNEIFORM SIGN UN GUNU | | CUNEIFORM SIGN KALAM | ※ Correction | Cuneiform (pdf) | |
| U+1680B | &#92171; | BAMUM LETTER PHASE-A MAEMBGBIEE | | BAMUM LETTER PHASE-A MAEMGBIEE | ※ Correction | Bamum Supplement (pdf) | |
| U+16881 | &#92289; | BAMUM LETTER PHASE-B PUNGAAM | | BAMUM LETTER PHASE-B PUNGGAAM | ※ Correction | Bamum Supplement (pdf) | |
| U+1688E | &#92302; | BAMUM LETTER PHASE-B NGOM | | BAMUM LETTER PHASE-B NGGOM | ※ Correction | Bamum Supplement (pdf) | |
| U+168DC | &#92380; | BAMUM LETTER PHASE-C SETFON | | BAMUM LETTER PHASE-C SHETFON | ※ Correction | Bamum Supplement (pdf) | |
| U+1697D | &#92541; | BAMUM LETTER PHASE-E NGOP | | BAMUM LETTER PHASE-E NGGOP | ※ Correction | Bamum Supplement (pdf) | |
| U+16E56 | &#93782; | MEDEFAIDRIN CAPITAL LETTER HP | | MEDEFAIDRIN CAPITAL LETTER H | ※ Correction | Medefaidrin (pdf) | |
| U+16E57 | &#93783; | MEDEFAIDRIN CAPITAL LETTER NY | | MEDEFAIDRIN CAPITAL LETTER NG | ※ Correction | Medefaidrin (pdf) | |
| U+16E76 | &#93814; | MEDEFAIDRIN SMALL LETTER HP | | MEDEFAIDRIN SMALL LETTER H | ※ Correction | Medefaidrin (pdf) | |
| U+16E77 | &#93815; | MEDEFAIDRIN SMALL LETTER NY | | MEDEFAIDRIN SMALL LETTER NG | ※ Correction | Medefaidrin (pdf) | |
| U+1B001 | &#110593; | HIRAGANA LETTER ARCHAIC YE | | HENTAIGANA LETTER E-1 | ※ Correction | Kana Supplement (pdf) | |
| U+1D0C5 | &#118981; | BYZANTINE MUSICAL SYMBOL FHTORA SKLIRON CHROMA VASIS | | BYZANTINE MUSICAL SYMBOL FTHORA SKLIRON CHROMA VASIS | ※ Correction | Byzantine Musical Symbols (pdf) | |
| U+1E899 | &#125081; | MENDE KIKAKUI SYLLABLE M172 MBOO | | MENDE KIKAKUI SYLLABLE M172 MBO | ※ Correction | Mende Kikakui (pdf) | |
| U+1E89A | &#125082; | MENDE KIKAKUI SYLLABLE M174 MBO | | MENDE KIKAKUI SYLLABLE M174 MBOO | ※ Correction | Mende Kikakui (pdf) | |
| U+E0100... U+E01EF | &#917760;... &#917999; | VARIATION SELECTOR-17... VARIATION SELECTOR-256 | VS17... VS256 | | Abbreviation | Variation Selectors Supplement (pdf) | |
| U+E0100... U+E01EF | &#917760;... &#917999; | VARIATION SELECTOR-17... VARIATION SELECTOR-256 | VS17... VS256 | | (240 code points) | Variation Selectors Supplement (pdf) | |
| U+E0100... U+E01EF | &#917760;... &#917999; | VARIATION SELECTOR-17... VARIATION SELECTOR-256 | VS17... VS256 | | Abbreviation | Variation Selectors Supplement (pdf) | |

== Informal alternative names ==
The Unicode standard also uses and publishes alternative names that are not formal, and are not listed as normative alias names. These labels may not be unique and may use irregular characters in their name. They are used in Unicode code charts, for example U+070F SYRIAC ABBREVIATION MARK: SAM.

== See also ==
- Control Pictures Separate characters (glyphs) to represent a control character. For example, U+2407 ␇ SYMBOL FOR BELL (U+0007).
- U+FFFD � REPLACEMENT CHARACTER
- Regional Indicator Symbols in the Enclosed Alphanumeric Supplement (Unicode block)
- Tags (Unicode block)
