= Joe Becker (Unicode) =

American computer scientist

- Born: Joseph D. Becker
- Occupation: Technical Vice President
- Years active: 1980s-present
- Known for: Co-founder of Unicode Consortium

Joseph D. Becker is an American computer scientist and one of the co-founders of the Unicode project, and a Technical Vice President Emeritus of the Unicode Consortium. He has worked on artificial intelligence at BBN and multilingual workstation software at Xerox.

Becker has long been involved in the issues of multilingual computing in general and Unicode in particular. His 1984 paper in Scientific American, "Multilingual Word Processing", was a seminal work on some of the problems involved, including the need to distinguish characters and glyphs. Following the release of the paper in 1987, he and two others began investigations into the practicality of creating a universal character set. Becker teamed up with his colleague Lee Collins who worked alongside him at Xerox and Mark Davis of Apple. It was Becker who coined the word "Unicode" to cover the project. His article Unicode 88, contained the first public summary of the principles originally underlying the Unicode standard.
