= Lee Collins (Unicode) =

Software engineer and co-founder of the Unicode Consortium

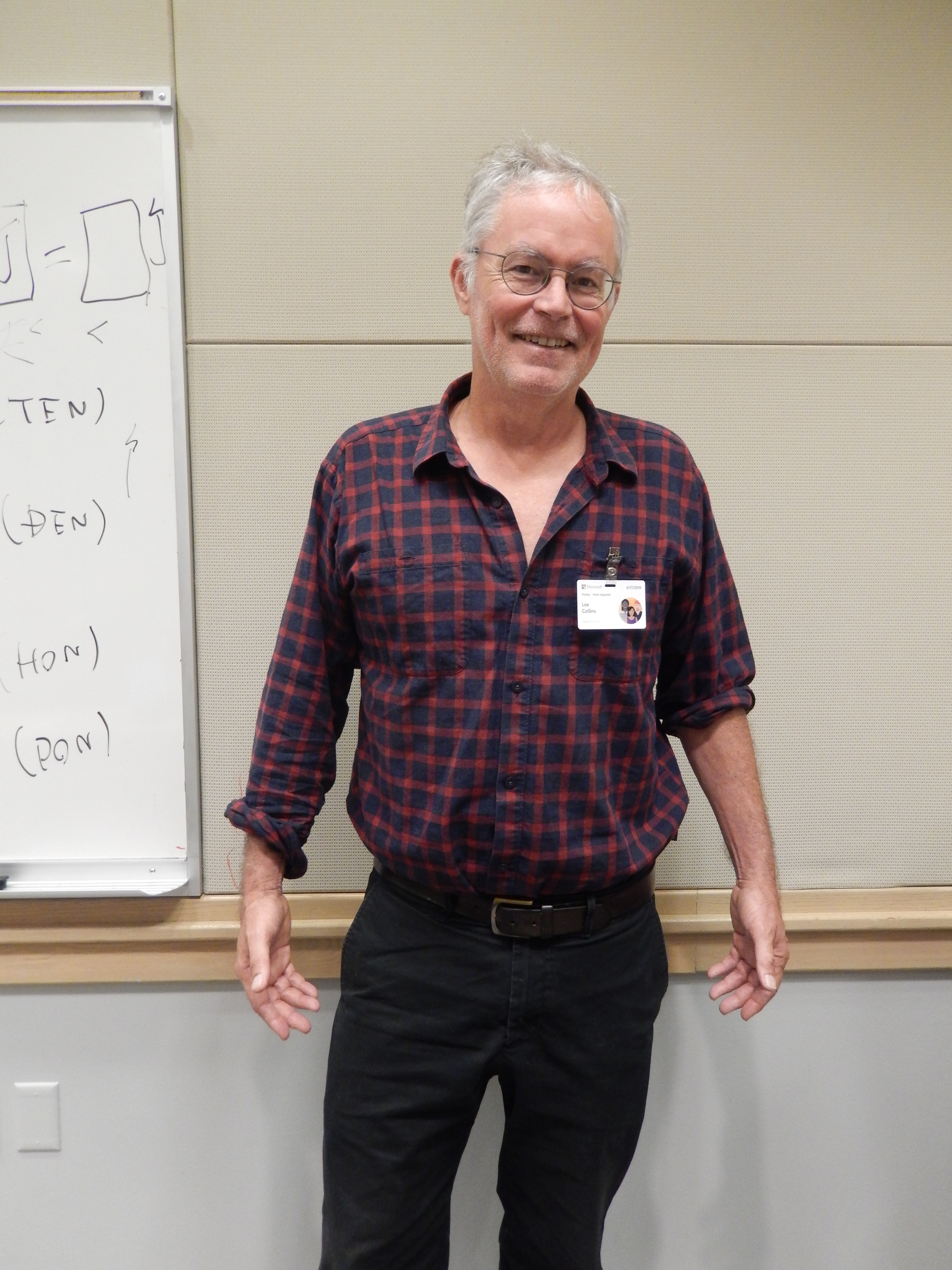
- Lee Collins at a meeting of ISO/IEC JTC 1/SC 2 at Redmond, Washington in June 2019
- Occupation: Software engineer
- Known for: Developing the Unicode Standard

Lee Collins is a software engineer and co-founder of the Unicode Consortium. In 1987, along with Joe Becker and Mark Davis they began to develop what is today known as Unicode. Collins has a Master of Arts in East Asian Languages and Cultures from Columbia University and was the Technical Vice President of Unicode Consortium from 1991 to 1993.
