= Medefaidrin =

Sacred language of the Obɛri Ɔkaimɛ Ibibio community

- Medefidrin
- 𖹝𖹰𖹯𖹼𖹫 𖹚𖹬𖹾𖹠𖹯 / Obɛri Ɔkaimɛ
- Created by: adherents of the Obɛri Ɔkaimɛ church
- Date: 1930s
- Setting and usage: Ibibioland, Nigeria
- Purpose: Constructed language: liturgical language; glossolalia; Medefaidrin
- Writing system: Obɛri Ɔkaimɛ script

Language codes
- ISO 639-3: dmf
- Glottolog: mede1238

Medefaidrin (Medefidrin), or Obɛri Ɔkaimɛ, is a constructed language and script created as a Christian sacred language by an Ibibio congregation in 1930s Nigeria. It has its roots in glossolalia ('speaking in tongues').

== History ==
Speakers consider Medefaidrin to be a 'spirit language'. It was created by two leaders of the church, Michael Ukpong and Akpan Akpan Udofia. They state that the Holy Spirit revealed the words of the language to Ukpong, while Udofia wrote them down. At the time Ibibio was not a written language, and Udofia created a script to write Medefaidrin.

After finalizing the language in 1936, members of the church started a school in which children were instructed in Medefaidrin. This was not tolerated by the British colonial government, which closed the school that same year. Nonetheless, the language continued to be used for church activities, including liturgy and hymns, and for letters and written contracts between members. The language faded from use, but in 1986 Udofia began teaching it again in the church's Sunday school in Ididep. Old manuscripts in Medefaidrin are in poor condition, and in the 21st century there has been some effort to preserve them.

== Phonology ==
Medefaidrin is a stress-accented rather than tonal language, though this may be changing under Ibibio influence. Unlike the Ibibio language, there are several consonant clusters in Medefaidrin, many of which do not exist in English.

== Writing system ==
Medefaidrin script
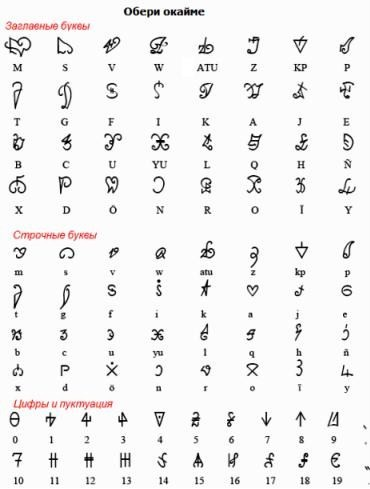
- Obɛri Ɔkaimɛ script
- Script type: Alphabet
- Period: 1930s to present
- Languages: Medefaidrin

ISO 15924
- ISO 15924: Medf (265), Medefaidrin (Oberi Okaime, Oberi Ɔkaimɛ)

Unicode
- Unicode alias: Medefaidrin
- Unicode range: U+16E40–U+16E9F

The script has upper- and lower-case letters like the English alphabet, but the letters were invented and there is no systematic relationship between glyph and sound. There are a number of arbitrary digraphs, whose pronunciation cannot be determined from their component letters, again as in English.

=== Unicode ===
Medefaidrin script was added to the Unicode Standard in June 2018 with the release of version 11.0.

The Unicode block for Medefaidrin is U+16E40–U+16E9F and contains 91 characters:

Medefaidrin^{[1]}^{[2]} Official Unicode Consortium code chart (PDF)
	0	1	2	3	4	5	6	7	8	9	A	B	C	D	E	F
U+16E4x	𖹀	𖹁	𖹂	𖹃	𖹄	𖹅	𖹆	𖹇	𖹈	𖹉	𖹊	𖹋	𖹌	𖹍	𖹎	𖹏
U+16E5x	𖹐	𖹑	𖹒	𖹓	𖹔	𖹕	𖹖	𖹗	𖹘	𖹙	𖹚	𖹛	𖹜	𖹝	𖹞	𖹟
U+16E6x	𖹠	𖹡	𖹢	𖹣	𖹤	𖹥	𖹦	𖹧	𖹨	𖹩	𖹪	𖹫	𖹬	𖹭	𖹮	𖹯
U+16E7x	𖹰	𖹱	𖹲	𖹳	𖹴	𖹵	𖹶	𖹷	𖹸	𖹹	𖹺	𖹻	𖹼	𖹽	𖹾	𖹿
U+16E8x	𖺀	𖺁	𖺂	𖺃	𖺄	𖺅	𖺆	𖺇	𖺈	𖺉	𖺊	𖺋	𖺌	𖺍	𖺎	𖺏
U+16E9x	𖺐	𖺑	𖺒	𖺓	𖺔	𖺕	𖺖	𖺗	𖺘	𖺙	𖺚					
Notes 1.As of Unicode version 18.0 2.Grey areas indicate non-assigned code points

== Grammar ==
Structurally, the language is largely a relexification of English, although the semantics are closer to the native language of its users, Ibibio. The definite article is dei, and several prepositions alliterate or rhyme with their English equivalents: su "to", fra "from", nai "by", kin "in". Most words, however, resemble nothing in English or Ibibio, but appear to have been created without a specific underlying system. The morphology is not highly developed, but a few elements have been taken from English, such as the plural in -s (z?).

== Numbers and dates ==
The vigesimal numbering system and calendar reflect Ibibio norms. The calendar year contains sixteen four-week months. (Note: The week is reported to consist of eight days, but it is not clear if it is 8 by Ibibio or English counting. What is 2 days from now in English is 3 days from now in Ibibio (with today counted inclusively as the first day), so starting a new week every 8 days when thinking in Ibibio means every 7 days when thinking in English.)

== See also ==
- Eskayan language and script of the Philippines
- Lingua Ignota and script of Germany

== Bibliography ==
- Abasiattai, Monday B. (1989). "The Oberi Okaime Christian Mission: Towards a History of an Ibibio Independent Church". Africa: Journal of the International African Institute. 59 (4): 496–516. doi:10.2307/1159944. ISSN 0001-9720. JSTOR 1159944. S2CID 143886594.
- Adams, R. F. G. (1947). "Obεri Ɔkaimε: A New African Language and Script". Africa: Journal of the International African Institute. 17 (1): 24–34. doi:10.2307/1156936. ISSN 0001-9720. JSTOR 1156936. S2CID 144319581.
- Gibbon, Dafydd; Ekpenyong, Moses; Urua, Eno-Abasi (2010). "Medefaidrin: Resources documenting the birth and death language life-cycle" (PDF). Proceedings of the Seventh Conference on International Language Resources and Evaluation (LREC'10). Valletta, Malta. ISBN 978-2-9517408-6-0.
- Gibbon, Dafydd; Urua, Eno-Abasi (2009). Preserving and understanding the Medefaidrin language of the Obɛri Ɔkaimɛ ('Church freely given') Ibibio community (PDF). World Congress of African Linguistics (WOCAL) 6. Cologne.
- Hau, Kathleen (1961). "Oberi Okaime script, texts and counting systems". Bulletin de l'Institut Français d'Afrique Noire. Série B, Sciences humaines. 23: 291–308.
- Udofia, Akpan Akpan (1953). "Dictionary, transcriptions and translations of texts". In Hau, Kathleen (ed.). Oberi Okaime Script, Texts and Counting System. Material relating to the Oberi Okaime language of southeastern Nigeria.
- Urua, Eno-Abasi (2008). "Medefidrin, the 'Spirit' language of the 1920s in Ibibio land". In Ndimele, Ozo-mekuri; Udoh, Imelda Icheji Lawrence; Anyanwu, Ogbonna (eds.). Critical Issues in the Study of Linguistics, Languages and Literatures in Nigeria: A Festshrift for Conrad Max Benedict Brann. Festschrift Series, 7.
