= DKOI =

EBCDIC encodings for Cyrillic

- Languages: Russian, Bulgarian
- Standard: GOST 19768; ST SEV 358; CSN 36 9103
- Classification: EBCDIC
- Other related encoding: Code page 880

DKOI (Russian: ДКОИ, Двоичный Код Обработки Информации, "Binary Code for Information Processing") is an EBCDIC encoding for Russian Cyrillic. It is a Telegraphy-based encoding used in ES EVM mainframes. It has been defined by several standards: GOST 19768-74 / ST SEV 358–76, ST SEV 358-88 / GOST 19768–93, CSN 36 9103.

== DKOI K1 ==
In DKOI K1 (ДКОИ К1), each Cyrillic letter is given its own code point. Characters are shown with their equivalent Unicode codes. The dollar sign $ may be placed in code point 0x5B; in that case the currency sign ¤ is in code point 0xE1.

DKOI K1
	0	1	2	3	4	5	6	7	8	9	A	B	C	D	E	F
0x	NUL	SOH	STX	ETX	PF	HT	LC	DEL			SMM	VT	FF	CR	SO	SI
1x	DLE	DC1	DC2	DC3	RES/ ENP	NL	BS	IL	CAN	EM	CC	CU1	IFS	IGS	IRS	IUS/ ITB
2x	DS	SOS	FS		BYP/ INP	LF	ETB	ESC			SM/ SW	CU2		ENQ	ACK	BEL
3x			SYN		PN	RST	UC	EOT				CU3	DC4	NAK		SUB
4x	SP	NBSP			ё						[	.	<	(	+	!
5x	&							Ъ	№		]	¤/$	*	)	;	
6x	-	/		Ё							¦	,	%	_	>	?
7x				SHY			ю	а	б	`	:	#	@	'	=	"
8x	ц	a	b	c	d	e	f	g	h	i	д	е	ф	г	х	и
9x	й	j	k	l	m	n	o	p	q	r	к	л	м	н	о	п
Ax	я	~	s	t	u	v	w	x	y	z	р	с	т	у	ж	в
Bx	ь	ы	з	ш	э	щ	ч	ъ	Ю	А	Б	Ц	Д	Е	Ф	Г
Cx	{	A	B	C	D	E	F	G	H	I	Х	И	Й	К	Л	М
Dx	}	J	K	L	M	N	O	P	Q	R	Н	О	П	Я	Р	С
Ex	\	¤	S	T	U	V	W	X	Y	Z	Т	У	Ж	В	Ь	Ы
Fx	0	1	2	3	4	5	6	7	8	9	З	Ш	Э	Щ	Ч	EO
Differences from Code page 500

== DKOI K2 ==
In DKOI K2 (ДКОИ К2), some Cyrillic letters (А, В, Е, К, М, Н, О, Р, С, Т, Х, а, е, о, р, с, у, х) are merged with visually identical Latin letters (A, B, E, K, M, H, O, P, C, T, X, a, e, o, p, c, y, x). Code points 0x5F and 0xA1 are negation ¬ and overline ‾ instead of ^ and ~. The dollar sign $ may be placed in code point 0x5B; in that case the currency sign ¤ is in code point 0xE1.

DKOI K2
	0	1	2	3	4	5	6	7	8	9	A	B	C	D	E	F
0x	NUL	SOH	STX	ETX	PF	HT	LC	DEL			SMM	VT	FF	CR	SO	SI
1x	DLE	DC1	DC2	DC3	RES/ ENP	NL	BS	IL	CAN	EM	CC	CU1	IFS	IGS	IRS	IUS/ ITB
2x	DS	SOS	FS		BYP/ INP	LF	ETB	ESC			SM/ SW	CU2		ENQ	ACK	BEL
3x			SYN		PN	RST	UC	EOT				CU3	DC4	NAK		SUB
4x	SP										[	.	<	(	+	!
5x	&							Ъ			]	¤/$	*	)	;	¬
6x	-	/									¦	,	%	_	>	?
7x							ю		б	`	:	#	@	'	=	"
8x	ц	a	b	c	d	e	f	g	h	i	д		ф	г		и
9x	й	j	k	l	m	n	o	p	q	r	к	л	м	н		п
Ax	я	‾	s	t	u	v	w	x	y	z			т		ж	в
Bx	ь	ы	з	ш	э	щ	ч	ъ	Ю		Б	Ц	Д		Ф	Г
Cx	{	A	B	C	D	E	F	G	H	I		И	Й		Л	
Dx	}	J	K	L	M	N	O	P	Q	R			П	Я		
Ex	\	¤	S	T	U	V	W	X	Y	Z		У	Ж		Ь	Ы
Fx	0	1	2	3	4	5	6	7	8	9	З	Ш	Э	Щ	Ч	EO
Differences from DKOI K1

== Code page 880 ==
IBM code page 880 is mostly a superset of DKOI K1, adding support for Cyrillic letters not used in Russian but used in Serbian Cyrillic, Macedonian Cyrillic, Belarusian Cyrillic or Soviet-era Ukrainian Cyrillic (i.e. including the Ukrainian Ye but not the Ukrainian Ge). 0x6A is a continuous vertical bar (like in code page 38), rather than a broken vertical bar (like in code pages 37 and 500), and 0x5B is always a dollar sign rather than a universal currency sign. This matches the character repertoire of KOI8-E.

IBM code page 880
	0	1	2	3	4	5	6	7	8	9	A	B	C	D	E	F
0x	NUL	SOH	STX	ETX	SEL	HT	RNL	DEL	GE	SPS	RPT	VT	FF	CR	SO	SI
1x	DLE	DC1	DC2	DC3	RES/ ENP	NL	BS	POC	CAN	EM	UBS	CU1	IFS	IGS	IRS	IUS/ ITB
2x	DS	SOS	FS	WUS	BYP/ INP	LF	ETB	ESC	SA	SFE	SM/ SW	CSP	MFA	ENQ	ACK	BEL
3x			SYN	IR	PP	TRN	NBS	EOT	SBS	IT	RFF	CU3	DC4	NAK		SUB
4x	SP	NBSP	ђ	ѓ	ё	є	ѕ	і	ї	ј	[	.	<	(	+	!
5x	&	љ	њ	ћ	ќ	ў	џ	Ъ	№	Ђ	]	$	*	)	;	
6x	-	/	Ѓ	Ё	Є	Ѕ	І	Ї	Ј	Љ	|	,	%	_	>	?
7x	Њ	Ћ	Ќ	SHY	Ў	Џ	ю	а	б	`	:	#	@	'	=	"
8x	ц	a	b	c	d	e	f	g	h	i	д	е	ф	г	х	и
9x	й	j	k	l	m	n	o	p	q	r	к	л	м	н	о	п
Ax	я	~	s	t	u	v	w	x	y	z	р	с	т	у	ж	в
Bx	ь	ы	з	ш	э	щ	ч	ъ	Ю	А	Б	Ц	Д	Е	Ф	Г
Cx	{	A	B	C	D	E	F	G	H	I	Х	И	Й	К	Л	М
Dx	}	J	K	L	M	N	O	P	Q	R	Н	О	П	Я	Р	С
Ex	\	¤	S	T	U	V	W	X	Y	Z	Т	У	Ж	В	Ь	Ы
Fx	0	1	2	3	4	5	6	7	8	9	З	Ш	Э	Щ	Ч	EO
Differences from DKOI K1

=== Code page 1025 ===
Code page 1025 is almost identical to code page 880, but the universal currency sign (¤) is replaced with a section sign (§), thus matching the character repertoire of ISO 8859-5.

=== Code page 410 ===
Code page 410 differs from code pages 880 and 1025 by lacking braces, backtick and tilde, including exponents of 2 and 3 and the numeric space, and including both the section sign and the universal currency sign in different locations to code pages 880 and 1025.

IBM code page 410 (differences from code pages 880 and 1025)
	0	1	2	3	4	5	6	7	8	9	A	B	C	D	E	F
7x	Њ	Ћ	Ќ	SHY	Ў	Џ	ю	а	б	§	:	#	@	'	=	"
Ax	я	³	s	t	u	v	w	x	y	z	р	с	т	у	ж	в
Bx	ь	ы	з	ш	э	щ	ч	ъ	Ю	А	Б	Ц	Д	Е	Ф	Г
Cx	¤	A	B	C	D	E	F	G	H	I	Х	И	Й	К	Л	М
Dx	²	J	K	L	M	N	O	P	Q	R	Н	О	П	Я	Р	С
Ex	\	FSP	S	T	U	V	W	X	Y	Z	Т	У	Ж	В	Ь	Ы
Differences from code pages 880 and 1025
