= ASCII =

Character encoding standard

- ASCII chart from MIL-STD-188-100 (1972)
- MIME / IANA: us-ascii
- Alias(es): ISO-IR-006, ANSI_X3.4-1968, ANSI_X3.4-1986, ISO_646.irv:1991, ISO646-US, us, IBM367, cp367
- Languages: primarily English; also supports Malay, Rotokas, Interlingua, Ido, and X-SAMPA
- Classification: ISO/IEC 646 series
- Extensions: Unicode; ISO/IEC 8859 (series); KOI-8; OEM (series); Windows-125x (series); Others
- Preceded by: ITA 2, FIELDATA
- Succeeded by: ISO/IEC 8859, ISO/IEC 10646 (Unicode)

ASCII (/ˈæski/ ASS-kee), an acronym for American Standard Code for Information Interchange, is a character encoding standard for representing a particular set of 95 (English-language–focused) printable and 33 control characters – a total of 128 code points. The set of available punctuation had significant impact on the syntax of computer languages and text markup. ASCII hugely influenced the design of character sets used by modern computers; for example, the first 128 code points of Unicode are the same as ASCII.

ASCII encodes each code-point as a value from 0 to 127 – storable as a seven-bit integer. Ninety-five code-points are printable, including digits 0 to 9, lowercase letters a to z, uppercase letters A to Z, and commonly used punctuation symbols. For example, the letter i is represented as 105 (decimal). Also, ASCII specifies 33 non-printing control codes which originated with Teletype devices, most of which are now obsolete. The control characters that are still commonly used include carriage return, line feed, and tab.

ASCII lacks code-points for characters with diacritical marks and therefore does not directly support terms or names such as résumé, jalapeño, or naïve. But, depending on hardware and software support, some diacritical marks can be rendered by overwriting a letter with a backtick (`) or tilde (~).

The Internet Assigned Numbers Authority (IANA) prefers the name US-ASCII for this character encoding.

ASCII is one of the IEEE milestones.

== History ==
ASCII is the standardisation of a seven-bit teleprinter code developed in part from earlier telegraph codes.

Work on the ASCII standard began in May 1961, when IBM engineer Bob Bemer submitted a proposal to the X3.2 subcommittee of the American Standards Association (ASA), now known as the American National Standards Institute (ANSI). The first edition of the standard was published in 1963, contemporaneously with the introduction of the Teletype Model 33. It later underwent a major revision in 1967, and several further revisions until 1986. In contrast to earlier telegraph codes such as Baudot, ASCII was ordered for more convenient collation (especially alphabetical sorting of lists), and added controls for devices other than teleprinters.

ASCII (1963). Control Pictures of equivalent controls are shown where they exist, or a grey dot otherwise.

ASCII was developed under the auspices of the X3 committee by its X3.2 (later X3L2) subcommittee and later by that subcommittee's X3.2.4 working group (now INCITS).

With the other special characters and control codes filled in, ASCII was published as ASA X3.4-1963, leaving 28 code positions without any assigned meaning, reserved for future standardization, and one unassigned control code. There was some debate at the time whether there should be more control characters rather than the lowercase alphabet. The indecision did not last long: during May 1963 the CCITT Working Party on the New Telegraph Alphabet proposed to assign lowercase characters to sticks (Note: The 128 characters of the 7-bit ASCII character set are divided into eight 16-character groups called sticks 0–7, associated with the three most-significant bits. Depending on the horizontal or vertical representation of the character map, sticks can correspond with either table rows or columns.) 6 and 7, and International Organization for Standardization TC 97 SC 2 voted during October to incorporate the change into its draft standard. The X3.2.4 task group voted its approval for the change to ASCII at its May 1963 meeting. Locating the lowercase letters in sticks 6 and 7 caused the characters to differ in bit pattern from the upper case by a single bit, which simplified case-insensitive character matching and the construction of keyboards and printers.

The X3 committee made other changes. It added the brace and vertical bar characters. It renamed some control characters – SOM became SOH. It moved or removed others – RU was removed. ASCII was subsequently updated as USAS X3.4-1967, then USAS X3.4-1968, ANSI X3.4-1977, and finally, ANSI X3.4-1986.

The use of ASCII format for Network Interchange was described in 1969. That document was formally elevated to an Internet Standard in 2015.

== Revisions ==
- ASA X3.4-1963
- ASA X3.4-1965 (approved, but not published, nevertheless used by IBM 2260 & 2265 Display Stations and IBM 2848 Display Control)
- USAS X3.4-1967
- USAS X3.4-1968
- ANSI X3.4-1977
- ANSI X3.4-1986
- ANSI X3.4-1986 (R1992)
- ANSI X3.4-1986 (R1997)
- ANSI INCITS 4-1986 (R2002)
- ANSI INCITS 4-1986 (R2007)
- INCITS 4-1986 (R2012)
- INCITS 4-1986 (R2017)
- INCITS 4-1986 (R2022)

In the X3.15 standard, the X3 committee also addressed how ASCII should be transmitted (least significant bit first) and recorded on perforated tape. They proposed a 9-track standard for magnetic tape and attempted to deal with some punched card formats.

== Design considerations ==
=== Bit width ===
The X3.2 subcommittee designed ASCII based on the earlier teleprinter encoding systems. Like other character encodings, ASCII specifies a correspondence between digital bit patterns and character symbols (i.e., graphemes and control characters). This allows digital devices to communicate with each other and to process, store, and communicate character-oriented information such as written language. Before ASCII was developed, the encodings in use included 26 alphabetic characters, 10 numerical digits, and from 11 to 25 special graphic symbols. To include all these and control characters compatible with the Comité Consultatif International Téléphonique et Télégraphique (CCITT) International Telegraph Alphabet No. 2 (ITA2) standard of 1932, FIELDATA (1956), and early EBCDIC (1963), more than 64 codes were required for ASCII.

ITA2 was in turn based on the Baudot code, the 5-bit telegraph code Émile Baudot invented in 1870 and patented in 1874.

The committee debated the possibility of a shift function (like in ITA2), which would allow more than 64 codes to be represented by a six-bit code. In a shifted code, some character codes determine choices between options for the following character codes. It allows compact encoding but is less reliable for data transmission, as an error in transmitting the shift code typically makes a long part of the transmission unreadable. The standards committee decided against shifting, and so ASCII required at least a seven-bit code.

The committee considered an eight-bit code, since eight bits (octets) would allow two four-bit patterns to efficiently encode two digits with binary-coded decimal. However, it would require all data transmission to send eight bits when seven could suffice. The committee voted to use a seven-bit code to minimize costs associated with data transmission. Since perforated tape at the time could record eight bits in one position, it also allowed for a parity bit for error checking if desired. Eight-bit machines (with octets as the native data type) that did not use parity checking typically set the eighth bit to 0.

=== Internal organization ===
The code itself was patterned so that most control codes were together and all graphic codes were together, for ease of identification. The first two so-called ASCII sticks (32 positions) were reserved for control characters. The "space" character had to come before graphics to make sorting easier, so it became position 20_{hex}; for the same reason, many special signs commonly used as separators were placed before digits. The committee decided it was important to support uppercase 64-character alphabets, and chose to pattern ASCII so it could be reduced easily to a usable 64-character set of graphic codes, as was done in the DEC SIXBIT code (1963). Lowercase letters were therefore not interleaved with uppercase. To keep options available for lowercase letters and other graphics, the special and numeric codes were arranged before the letters, and the letter A was placed in position 41_{hex} to match the draft of the corresponding British standard. The digits 0–9 are prefixed with 011, but the remaining 4 bits correspond to their respective values in binary, making conversion with binary-coded decimal straightforward (for example, 5 is encoded to 0110101, where 5 is 0101 in binary).

Many of the non-alphanumeric characters were positioned to correspond to their shifted position on typewriters; an important subtlety is that these were based on mechanical typewriters, not electric typewriters. Mechanical typewriters followed the de facto standard set by the Remington No. 2 (1878), the first typewriter with a shift key, and the shifted values of 23456789- were "#$%_&'() – early typewriters omitted 0 and 1, using O (capital letter o) and l (lowercase letter L) instead, but 1! and 0) pairs became standard once 0 and 1 became common. Thus, in ASCII !"#$% were placed in the second stick, positions 1–5, corresponding to the digits 1–5 in the adjacent stick. The parentheses could not correspond to 9 and 0, however, because the place corresponding to 0 was taken by the space character. This was accommodated by removing _ (underscore) from 6 and shifting the remaining characters, which corresponded to many European typewriters that placed the parentheses with 8 and 9. This discrepancy from typewriters led to bit-paired keyboards, notably the Teletype Model 33, which used the left-shifted layout corresponding to ASCII, differently from traditional mechanical typewriters.

Electric typewriters, notably the IBM Selectric (1961), used a somewhat different layout that has become de facto standard on computers – following the IBM PC (1981), especially Model M (1984) – and thus shift values for symbols on modern keyboards do not correspond as closely to the ASCII table as earlier keyboards did. The /? pair also dates to the No. 2, and the ,< .> pairs were used on some keyboards (others, including the No. 2, did not shift , (comma) or . (full stop) so they could be used in uppercase without unshifting). However, ASCII split the ;: pair (dating to No. 2), and rearranged mathematical symbols (varied conventions, commonly -* =+) to :* ;+ -=.

Some then-common typewriter characters were not included, notably ½ ¼ ¢, while ^ ` ~ were included as diacritics for international use, and < > for mathematical use, together with the simple line characters \ | (in addition to common /). The @ symbol was not used in continental Europe, and the committee expected it would be replaced by an accented À in the French variation, so the @ was placed in position 40_{hex}, right before the letter A.

The control codes felt essential for data transmission were the start of message (SOM), end of address (EOA), end of message (EOM), end of transmission (EOT), "who are you?" (WRU), "Are you?" (RU), a reserved device control (DC0), synchronous idle (SYNC), and acknowledge (ACK). These were positioned to maximize the Hamming distance between their bit patterns.

=== Character order ===
ASCII code order is also called ASCIIbetical order. Collation of data is sometimes done in this order rather than "standard" alphabetical order (collating sequence). The main deviations in ASCII order are:

- All uppercase comes before lowercase letters; for example, "Z" precedes "a"
- Digits and many punctuation marks come before letters

An intermediate order converts uppercase letters to lowercase before comparing ASCII values.

== Character set ==
ASCII (1977/1986)
	0	1	2	3	4	5	6	7	8	9	A	B	C	D	E	F
0x	NUL	SOH	STX	ETX	EOT	ENQ	ACK	BEL	BS	HT	LF	VT	FF	CR	SO	SI
1x	DLE	DC1	DC2	DC3	DC4	NAK	SYN	ETB	CAN	EM	SUB	ESC	FS	GS	RS	US
2x	SP	!	"	#	$	%	&	'	(	)	*	+	,	-	.	/
3x	0	1	2	3	4	5	6	7	8	9	:	;	<	=	>	?
4x	@	A	B	C	D	E	F	G	H	I	J	K	L	M	N	O
5x	P	Q	R	S	T	U	V	W	X	Y	Z	[	\	]		_
6x	`	a	b	c	d	e	f	g	h	i	j	k	l	m	n	o
7x	p	q	r	s	t	u	v	w	x	y	z	{	|	}	~	DEL
Changed or added in 1963 version Changed in both 1963 version and 1965 draft

== Character groups ==
=== Control characters ===
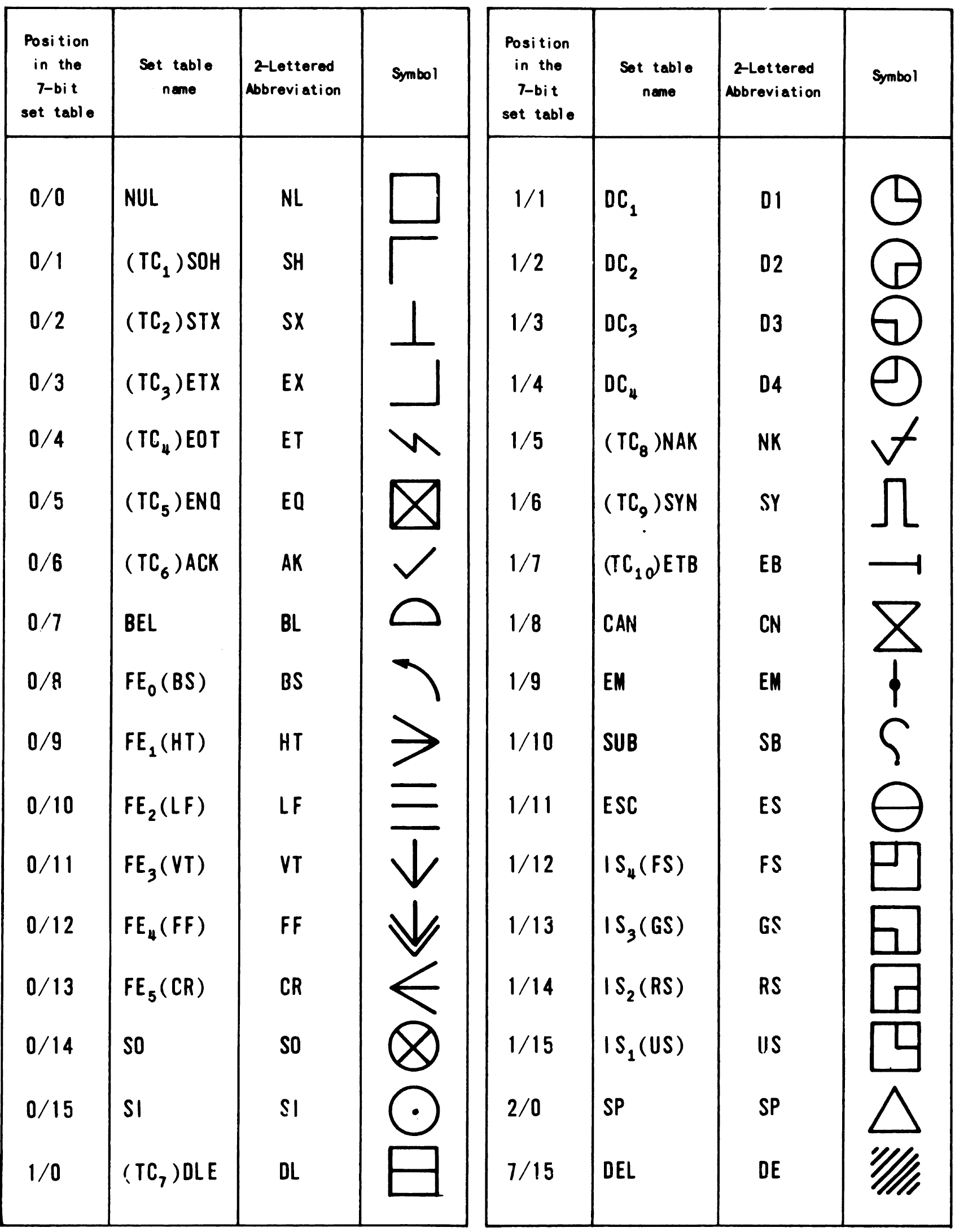
Early symbols assigned to the 32 control characters, space and delete characters (ISO 2047, MIL-STD-188-100, 1972)

ASCII reserves the first 32 code points (numbers 0–31 decimal) and the last one (number 127 decimal) for control characters. These are codes intended to control peripheral devices (such as printers), or to provide meta-information about data streams, such as those stored on magnetic tape. Despite their name, these code points do not represent printable characters (i.e. they are not characters at all, but signals). For debugging purposes, "placeholder" symbols (such as those given in ISO 2047 and its predecessors) are assigned to them.

For example, character 0x0A represents the "line feed" function (which causes a printer to advance its paper), and character 8 represents "backspace". RFC 2822 refers to control characters that do not include carriage return, line feed or white space as non-whitespace control characters. Except for the control characters that prescribe elementary line-oriented formatting, ASCII does not define any mechanism for describing the structure or appearance of text within a document. Other schemes, such as markup languages, address page and document layout and formatting.

The original ASCII standard used only short descriptive phrases for each control character. The ambiguity this caused was sometimes intentional, such as when a character would be used slightly differently on a terminal link or in a data stream.

Probably the most influential single device affecting the interpretation of these characters was the Teletype Model 33 ASR, which was a printing terminal with an available paper tape reader/punch option. Paper tape was a very popular medium for long-term program storage until the 1980s, less costly and in some ways less fragile than magnetic tape. In particular, the Teletype Model 33 machine assignments for codes 17 (control-Q, DC1, also known as XON), 19 (control-S, DC3, also known as XOFF), and 127 (delete) became de facto standards. The Model 33 was also notable for taking the description of control-G (code 7, BEL, meaning audibly alert the operator) literally, as the unit contained an actual bell which it rang when it received a BEL character. Because the keytop for the O key also showed a left-arrow symbol (from ASCII-1963, which had this character instead of underscore), a noncompliant use of code 15 (control-O, shift in) interpreted as "delete previous character" was also adopted by many early timesharing systems but eventually became neglected.

When a Teletype 33 ASR equipped with the automatic paper tape reader received a control-S (XOFF, an abbreviation for transmit off), it caused the tape reader to stop; receiving control-Q (XON, transmit on) caused the tape reader to resume. This so-called flow control technique became adopted by several early computer operating systems as a "handshaking" signal warning a sender to stop transmission because of impending buffer overflow; it persists to this day in many systems as a manual output control technique. On some systems, control-S retains its meaning, but control-Q is replaced by a second control-S to resume output.

The 33 ASR also could be configured to employ control-R (DC2) and control-T (DC4) to start and stop the tape punch; on some units equipped with this function, the corresponding control character lettering on the keycap above the letter was TAPE and ~~TAPE~~ respectively.

==== Delete vs backspace ====
The Teletype could not move its typehead backwards, so it did not have a key on its keyboard to send a BS (backspace). Instead, there was a key marked RUB OUT that sent code 127 (DEL). The purpose of this key was to erase mistakes in a manually-input paper tape: the operator had to push a button on the tape punch to back it up, then type the rubout, which punched all holes and replaced the mistake with a character that was intended to be ignored. Teletypes were commonly used with the less-expensive computers from Digital Equipment Corporation (DEC); these systems had to use what keys were available, and thus the DEL character was assigned to erase the previous character. Because of this, DEC video terminals (by default) sent the DEL character for the key marked "Backspace" while the separate key marked "Delete" sent an escape sequence; many other competing terminals sent a BS character for the backspace key.

The early Unix tty drivers, unlike some modern implementations, allowed only one character to be set to erase the previous character in canonical input processing (where a very simple line editor is available); this could be set to BS or DEL, but not both, resulting in recurring situations of ambiguity where users had to decide depending on what terminal they were using (shells that allow line editing, such as ksh, bash, and zsh, understand both). The assumption that no key sent a BS character allowed Ctrl+H to be used for other purposes, such as the "help" prefix command in GNU Emacs.

==== Escape ====
Many more of the control characters have been assigned meanings quite different from their original ones. The "escape" character (ESC, code 27), for example, was intended originally to allow sending of other control characters as literals instead of invoking their meaning, an "escape sequence". This is the same meaning of "escape" encountered in URL encodings, C language strings, and other systems where certain characters have a reserved meaning. Over time this interpretation has been co-opted and has eventually been changed.

In modern usage, an ESC sent to the terminal usually indicates the start of a command sequence, which can be used to address the cursor, scroll a region, set/query various terminal properties, and more. They are usually in the form of a so-called "ANSI escape code" (often starting with a "Control Sequence Introducer", "CSI", "ESC [") from ECMA-48 (1972) and its successors. Some escape sequences do not have introducers, like the "Reset to Initial State", "RIS" command "ESC c".

In contrast, an ESC read from the terminal is most often used as an out-of-band character used to terminate an operation or special mode in text editors such as TECO and vi. In graphical user interface (GUI) and windowing systems, ESC generally causes an application to abort its current operation or to exit (terminate) altogether.

==== End of line ====
The reapplication of some control characters to new meanings created problems when transferring "plain text" files between systems. The best example of this is the newline problem in various operating systems. Teletype machines required that a line of text be terminated with a "carriage return" (to move the printhead to the beginning of the line) followed by a "line feed" (to advance the paper by one line). The name "carriage return" comes from the fact that, on a manual typewriter, the carriage holding the paper moves while the typebars that strike the ribbon remain stationary. The entire carriage must be pushed to the right ("returned") in order to position the paper for the next line.

DEC operating systems (OS/8, RT-11, RSX-11, RSTS, TOPS-10, etc.) stored both characters at the end of each line in textual files, as needed by Teletype machines. When so-called "glass TTYs" were introduced (later called CRTs or "dumb terminals"), they followed the same logic, expecting the same CR and LF characters. When Gary Kildall created CP/M, he was inspired by some of the command line interface conventions used in DEC's RT-11 operating system.

Until the introduction of IBM PC DOS in 1981, IBM had no influence in this, because their 1970s operating systems used EBCDIC encoding instead of ASCII and they were oriented toward punch-card input and line printer output on which the concept of "carriage return" was meaningless. IBM's PC DOS (also marketed as MS-DOS by Microsoft) inherited the CRLF convention by virtue of being loosely based on CP/M, and Windows, in turn, inherited it from MS-DOS.

Placing CR and LF at the end of each line in a plain text document or data stream reflects what terminals and printers needed to receive, to display that material. Multics introduced an innovation: it used only one character (LF), to represent the end of the line in stored files and in data streams. Upon output, the tty driver converts the LF to CRLF, so files can be printed to a terminal without needing a command to explicitly convert the file format. Unix and Unix-like systems adopted this design from Multics, as did Amiga systems. UNIX documents say "newline" or "NL" to refer to the line terminator. Contrarily, the Radio Shack TRS-80, Apple DOS, Apple ProDOS, and classic Mac OS used a lone carriage return (CR) to terminate lines. Apple's later operating system, Mac OS X (now called macOS) is based on Unix, so it uses line feed (LF).

Computers attached to the ARPANET included machines running operating systems such as TOPS-10 and TENEX, which used CR-LF line endings; operating systems such as Multics, which used LF line endings; and operating systems such as OS/360, which represented lines as a character count followed by the characters of the line and which used EBCDIC rather than ASCII encoding. To enable communication between all these systems, the Telnet protocol defined a "Network Virtual Terminal" (NVT), wherein a single text format (ASCII with CR-LF line endings) was used for transmission and each system converted to/from its own native representation.

The File Transfer Protocol adopted the Telnet protocol, including the Network Virtual Terminal, for transmitting commands and for transferring textual files (known as "ASCII mode"). Internet E-mail is built atop the NVT. The World Wide Web's HTTP uses a modified NVT: the standard allows lone CR and LF characters but requires that each be interpreted as an NVT CRLF.

Complexity arose in network-facing systems that didn't follow the NVT mechanism, such as some version control systems. Bugs sometimes expose a system's native implementation to other systems on the Internet, causing data corruption.

==== End of file/stream ====
The PDP-6 monitor, and its PDP-10 successor TOPS-10, used control-Z (SUB) as an end-of-file indication for input from a terminal. Some operating systems such as CP/M tracked file length only in units of disk blocks, and used control-Z to mark the end of the actual text in the file. For these reasons, EOF, or end-of-file, was used colloquially and conventionally as a three-letter acronym for control-Z instead of SUBstitute. The end-of-text character (ETX), also known as control-C, was inappropriate for a variety of reasons, while using control-Z as the control character to end a file is analogous to the letter Z's position at the end of the alphabet, and serves as a very convenient mnemonic aid. A historically common and still prevalent convention uses the ETX character convention to interrupt and halt a program via an input data stream, usually from a keyboard.

The Unix terminal driver uses the end-of-transmission character (EOT), also known as control-D, to indicate the end of a data stream.

In the C programming language, and in Unix conventions, the null character is used to terminate text strings; such null-terminated strings can be known in abbreviation as ASCIZ or ASCIIZ, where here Z stands for "zero".

== Table of codes ==
=== Control code table ===
Binary	Oct	Dec	Hex	Abbreviation			Unicode Control Pictures (Note: The Unicode characters from the "Control Pictures" area U+2400 to U+2421 reserved for representing control characters when it is necessary to print or display them rather than have them perform their intended function. Some browsers may not display these properly.)	Caret notation (Note: Caret notation is often used to represent control characters on a terminal. On most text terminals, holding down the Ctrl key while typing the second character will type the control character. Sometimes the shift key is not needed, for instance ^@ may be typable with just Ctrl+2 or Ctrl+Space.)	C escape sequence (Note: Character escape sequences in C programming language and many other languages influenced by it, such as Java and Perl (though not all implementations necessarily support all escape sequences).)	Name (1967)
Binary	Oct	Dec	Hex	1963	1965	1967	Unicode Control Pictures	Caret notation	C escape sequence	Name (1967)
000 0000	000	0	00	NULL	NUL		␀	^@	\0 (Note: Entering any Single-Byte character is supported by escaping its octal value. However, because of the role of NULL in C-strings, this case see particular use.)	Null
000 0001	001	1	01	SOM	SOH		␁	^A		Start of Heading
000 0010	002	2	02	EOA	STX		␂	^B		Start of Text
000 0011	003	3	03	EOM	ETX		␃	^C		End of Text
000 0100	004	4	04	EOT			␄	^D		End of Transmission
000 0101	005	5	05	WRU	ENQ		␅	^E		Enquiry
000 0110	006	6	06	RU	ACK		␆	^F		Acknowledgement
000 0111	007	7	07	BELL	BEL		␇	^G	\a	Bell (Alert)
000 1000	010	8	08	FE0	BS		␈	^H	\b	Backspace (Note: The Backspace character can also be entered by pressing the ← Backspace key on some systems.) (Note: The ambiguity of Backspace is due to early terminals designed assuming the main use of the keyboard would be to manually punch paper tape while not connected to a computer. To delete the previous character, one had to back up the paper tape punch, which for mechanical and simplicity reasons was a button on the punch itself and not the keyboard, then type the rubout character. They therefore placed a key producing rubout at the location used on typewriters for backspace. When systems used these terminals and provided command-line editing, they had to use the "rubout" code to perform a backspace, and often did not interpret the backspace character (they might echo "^H" for backspace). Other terminals not designed for paper tape made the key at this location produce Backspace, and systems designed for these used that character to back up. Since the delete code often produced a backspace effect, this also forced terminal manufacturers to make any Delete key produce something other than the Delete character.)
000 1001	011	9	09	HT/SK	HT		␉	^I	\t	Horizontal Tab (Note: The Tab character can also be entered by pressing the Tab ↹ key on most systems.)
000 1010	012	10	0A	LF			␊	^J	\n	Line Feed
000 1011	013	11	0B	VTAB	VT		␋	^K	\v	Vertical Tab
000 1100	014	12	0C	FF			␌	^L	\f	Form Feed
000 1101	015	13	0D	CR			␍	^M	\r	Carriage Return (Note: The Carriage Return character can also be entered by pressing the ↵ Enter or Return key on most systems.)
000 1110	016	14	0E	SO			␎	^N		Shift Out
000 1111	017	15	0F	SI			␏	^O		Shift In
001 0000	020	16	10	DC0	DLE		␐	^P		Data Link Escape
001 0001	021	17	11	DC1			␑	^Q		Device Control 1 (often XON)
001 0010	022	18	12	DC2			␒	^R		Device Control 2
001 0011	023	19	13	DC3			␓	^S		Device Control 3 (often XOFF)
001 0100	024	20	14	DC4			␔	^T		Device Control 4
001 0101	025	21	15	ERR	NAK		␕	^U		Negative Acknowledgement
001 0110	026	22	16	SYNC	SYN		␖	^V		Synchronous Idle
001 0111	027	23	17	LEM	ETB		␗	^W		End of Transmission Block
001 1000	030	24	18	S0	CAN		␘	^X		Cancel
001 1001	031	25	19	S1	EM		␙	^Y		End of Medium
001 1010	032	26	1A	S2	SS	SUB	␚	^Z		Substitute
001 1011	033	27	1B	S3	ESC		␛	^[	\e (Note: The \e escape sequence is not part of ISO C and many other language specifications. However, it is understood by several compilers, including GCC.)	Escape (Note: The Escape character can also be entered by pressing the Esc key on some systems.)
001 1100	034	28	1C	S4	FS		␜	^\		File Separator
001 1101	035	29	1D	S5	GS		␝	^]		Group Separator
001 1110	036	30	1E	S6	RS		␞	^^ (Note: ^^ means Ctrl+^ (pressing the "Ctrl" and caret keys).)		Record Separator
001 1111	037	31	1F	S7	US		␟	^_		Unit Separator
111 1111	177	127	7F	DEL			␡	^?		Delete (Note: The Delete character can sometimes be entered by pressing the ← Backspace key on some systems.)

Other representations might be used by specialist equipment, for example ISO 2047 graphics or hexadecimal numbers.

=== Printable character table ===
At the time of adoption, the codes 20_{hex} to 7E_{hex} would cause the printing of a visible character (a glyph), and thus were designated "printable characters". These codes represent letters, digits, punctuation marks, and a few miscellaneous symbols. There are 95 printable characters in total. (Note: Printed out, the characters are: !"#$%&'()*+,-./0123456789:;<=>?@ABCDEFGHIJKLMNOPQRSTUVWXYZ[\]^_`abcdefghijklmnopqrstuvwxyz{|}~)

The empty space between words, as produced by the space bar of a keyboard, is character code 20_{hex}. Since the space character is visible in printed text it is considered a "printable character", even though it is unique in having no visible glyph. It is listed in the printable character table, as per the ASCII standard, instead of in the control character table.

Code 7F_{hex} corresponds to the non-printable "delete" (DEL) control character and is listed in the control character table.

Earlier versions of ASCII used the up arrow instead of the caret (5E_{hex}) and the left arrow instead of the underscore (5F_{hex}).

Binary	Oct	Dec	Hex	Glyph		
Binary	Oct	Dec	Hex	1963	1965	1967
010 0000	040	32	20	space (no visible glyph)		
010 0001	041	33	21	!		
010 0010	042	34	22	"		
010 0011	043	35	23	#		
010 0100	044	36	24	$		
010 0101	045	37	25	%		
010 0110	046	38	26	&		
010 0111	047	39	27	'		
010 1000	050	40	28	(		
010 1001	051	41	29	)		
010 1010	052	42	2A	*		
010 1011	053	43	2B	+		
010 1100	054	44	2C	,		
010 1101	055	45	2D	-		
010 1110	056	46	2E	.		
010 1111	057	47	2F	/		
011 0000	060	48	30	0		
011 0001	061	49	31	1		
011 0010	062	50	32	2		
011 0011	063	51	33	3		
011 0100	064	52	34	4		
011 0101	065	53	35	5		
011 0110	066	54	36	6		
011 0111	067	55	37	7		
011 1000	070	56	38	8		
011 1001	071	57	39	9		
011 1010	072	58	3A	:		
011 1011	073	59	3B	;		
011 1100	074	60	3C	<		
011 1101	075	61	3D	=		
011 1110	076	62	3E	>		
011 1111	077	63	3F	?		
100 0000	100	64	40	@	`	@
100 0001	101	65	41	A		
100 0010	102	66	42	B		
100 0011	103	67	43	C		
100 0100	104	68	44	D		
100 0101	105	69	45	E		
100 0110	106	70	46	F		
100 0111	107	71	47	G		
100 1000	110	72	48	H		
100 1001	111	73	49	I		
100 1010	112	74	4A	J		
100 1011	113	75	4B	K		
100 1100	114	76	4C	L		
100 1101	115	77	4D	M		
100 1110	116	78	4E	N		
100 1111	117	79	4F	O		
101 0000	120	80	50	P		
101 0001	121	81	51	Q		
101 0010	122	82	52	R		
101 0011	123	83	53	S		
101 0100	124	84	54	T		
101 0101	125	85	55	U		
101 0110	126	86	56	V		
101 0111	127	87	57	W		
101 1000	130	88	58	X		
101 1001	131	89	59	Y		
101 1010	132	90	5A	Z		
101 1011	133	91	5B	[		
101 1100	134	92	5C	\	~	\
101 1101	135	93	5D	]		
101 1110	136	94	5E	↑		
101 1111	137	95	5F	←	_	
110 0000	140	96	60		@	`
110 0001	141	97	61		a	
110 0010	142	98	62		b	
110 0011	143	99	63		c	
110 0100	144	100	64		d	
110 0101	145	101	65		e	
110 0110	146	102	66		f	
110 0111	147	103	67		g	
110 1000	150	104	68		h	
110 1001	151	105	69		i	
110 1010	152	106	6A		j	
110 1011	153	107	6B		k	
110 1100	154	108	6C		l	
110 1101	155	109	6D		m	
110 1110	156	110	6E		n	
110 1111	157	111	6F		o	
111 0000	160	112	70		p	
111 0001	161	113	71		q	
111 0010	162	114	72		r	
111 0011	163	115	73		s	
111 0100	164	116	74		t	
111 0101	165	117	75		u	
111 0110	166	118	76		v	
111 0111	167	119	77		w	
111 1000	170	120	78		x	
111 1001	171	121	79		y	
111 1010	172	122	7A		z	
111 1011	173	123	7B		{	
111 1100	174	124	7C	ACK	¬	|
111 1101	175	125	7D		}	
111 1110	176	126	7E	ESC	|	~

== Usage ==
ASCII was first used commercially during 1963 as a seven-bit teleprinter code for American Telephone & Telegraph's TWX (TeletypeWriter eXchange) network. TWX originally used the earlier five-bit ITA2, which was also used by the competing Telex teleprinter system. Bob Bemer introduced features such as the escape sequence. His British colleague Hugh McGregor Ross helped to popularize this work – according to Bemer, "so much so that the code that was to become ASCII was first called the Bemer–Ross Code in Europe". Because of his extensive work on ASCII, Bemer has been called "the father of ASCII".

On March 11, 1968, US President Lyndon B. Johnson mandated that all computers purchased by the United States Federal Government support ASCII, stating:

I have also approved recommendations of the Secretary of Commerce [Luther H. Hodges] regarding standards for recording the Standard Code for Information Interchange on magnetic tapes and paper tapes when they are used in computer operations. All computers and related equipment configurations brought into the Federal Government inventory on and after July 1, 1969, must have the capability to use the Standard Code for Information Interchange and the formats prescribed by the magnetic tape and paper tape standards when these media are used.

ASCII was the most common character encoding on the World Wide Web until December 2007, when the UTF-8 encoding surpassed it; UTF-8 is backward compatible with ASCII.

== Variants and derivations ==
As computer technology spread throughout the world, different standards bodies and corporations developed many variations of ASCII to facilitate the expression of non-English languages that used Roman-based alphabets. One could class some of these variations as "ASCII extensions", although some misuse that term to represent all variants, including those that do not preserve ASCII's character-map in the 7-bit range. Furthermore, the ASCII extensions have also been mislabelled as ASCII.

=== 7-bit codes ===
From early in its development, ASCII was intended to be just one of several national variants of an international character code standard.

Other international standards bodies have ratified character encodings such as ISO 646 (1967) that are identical or nearly identical to ASCII, with extensions for characters outside the English alphabet and symbols used outside the United States, such as the symbol for the United Kingdom's pound sterling (£) seen in code page 1104. Almost every country needed an adapted version of ASCII, since ASCII suited the needs of only the US and a few other countries. For example, Canada had its own version that supported French characters.

Many other countries developed variants of ASCII to include non-English letters (e.g. é, ñ, ß, Ł), currency symbols (e.g. £, ¥), etc. See also YUSCII (Yugoslavia).

It would share most characters in common, but assign other locally useful characters to several code points reserved for "national use". However, the four years that elapsed between the publication of ASCII-1963 and ISO's first acceptance of an international recommendation during 1967 caused ASCII's choices for the national use characters to seem to be de facto standards for the world, causing confusion and incompatibility once other countries did begin to make their own assignments to these code points.

ISO/IEC 646, like ASCII, is a 7-bit character set. It does not make any additional codes available, so the same code points encoded different characters in different countries. Escape codes were defined to indicate which national variant applied to a piece of text, but they were rarely used, so it was often impossible to know what variant to work with and, therefore, which character a code represented, and in general, text-processing systems could cope with only one variant anyway.

Because the bracket and brace characters of ASCII were assigned to "national use" code points that were used for accented letters in other national variants of ISO/IEC 646, a German, French, or Swedish, etc. programmer using their national variant of ISO/IEC 646, rather than ASCII, had to write, and thus read, something such as

ä aÄiÜ = 'Ön'; ü

instead of

{ a[i] = '\n'; }

C trigraphs were created to solve this problem for ANSI C, although their late introduction and inconsistent implementation in compilers limited their use. Many programmers kept their computers on ASCII, so plain-text in Swedish, German etc. (for example, in e-mail or Usenet) contained "{, }" and similar variants in the middle of words, something those programmers got used to. For example, a Swedish programmer mailing another programmer asking if they should go for lunch, could get "N{ jag har sm|rg}sar" as the answer, which should be "Nä jag har smörgåsar" meaning "No I've got sandwiches".

In Japan and Korea, still as of the 2020s, a variation of ASCII is used, in which the backslash (5C hex) is rendered as ¥ (a Yen sign, in Japan) or ₩ (a Won sign, in Korea). This means that, for example, the file path C:\Users\Smith is shown as C:¥Users¥Smith (in Japan) or C:₩Users₩Smith (in Korea).

In Europe, teletext character sets, which are variants of ASCII, are used for broadcast TV subtitles, defined by World System Teletext and broadcast using the DVB-TXT standard for embedding teletext into DVB transmissions. In the case that the subtitles were initially authored for teletext and converted, the derived subtitle formats are constrained to the same character sets.

=== 8-bit codes ===
Eventually, as 8-, 16-, and 32-bit (and later 64-bit) computers began to replace 12-, 18-, and 36-bit computers as the norm, it became common to use an 8-bit byte to store each character in memory, providing an opportunity for extended, 8-bit relatives of ASCII. In most cases these developed as true extensions of ASCII, leaving the original character-mapping intact, but adding additional character definitions after the first 128 (i.e., 7-bit) characters. ASCII itself remained a seven-bit code: the term "extended ASCII" has no official status.

For some countries, 8-bit extensions of ASCII were developed that included support for characters used in local languages (for example, ISCII for India and VISCII for Vietnam).

Even for markets where it was not necessary to add many characters to support additional languages, manufacturers of early home computer systems often developed their own 8-bit extensions of ASCII to include additional characters, such as box-drawing characters, semigraphics, and video game sprites. Often, these additions also replaced control characters (index 0 to 31, as well as index 127) with even more platform-specific extensions. In other cases, the extra bit was used for some other purpose, such as toggling inverse video; this approach was used by ATASCII, an extension of ASCII developed by Atari.

Most ASCII extensions are based on ASCII-1967 (the current standard), but some extensions are instead based on the earlier ASCII-1963. For example, PETSCII, which was developed by Commodore International for their 8-bit systems, is based on ASCII-1963. Likewise, many Sharp MZ character sets are based on ASCII-1963.

IBM defined code page 437 for the IBM PC, replacing the control characters with graphic symbols such as smiley faces, and mapping additional graphic characters to the upper 128 positions. Digital Equipment Corporation developed the Multinational Character Set (DEC-MCS) for use in the popular VT220 terminal as one of the first extensions designed more for international languages than for block graphics. Apple defined Mac OS Roman for the Macintosh and Adobe defined the PostScript Standard Encoding for PostScript; both sets contained "international" letters, typographic symbols and punctuation marks instead of graphics, more like modern character sets.

The ISO/IEC 8859 standard (derived from the DEC-MCS) provided a standard that most systems copied (or at least were based on, when not copied exactly). A popular further extension designed by Microsoft, Windows-1252 (often mislabeled as ISO-8859-1), added the typographic punctuation marks needed for traditional text printing. ISO-8859-1, Windows-1252, and the original 7-bit ASCII were the most common character encoding methods on the World Wide Web until 2008, when UTF-8 overtook them.

ISO/IEC 4873 introduced 32 additional control codes defined in the 80–9F hexadecimal range, as part of extending the 7-bit ASCII encoding to become an 8-bit system.

=== Unicode ===
Unicode and the ISO/IEC 10646 Universal Character Set (UCS) have a much wider array of characters and their various encoding forms have begun to supplant ISO/IEC 8859 and ASCII rapidly in many environments. While ASCII is limited to 128 characters, Unicode and the UCS support more characters by separating the concepts of unique identification (using natural numbers called code points) and encoding (to 8-, 16-, or 32-bit binary formats, called UTF-8, UTF-16, and UTF-32, respectively).

ASCII was incorporated into the Unicode (1991) character set as the first 128 symbols, so the 7-bit ASCII characters have the same numeric codes in both sets. This allows UTF-8 to be backward compatible with 7-bit ASCII, as a UTF-8 file containing only ASCII characters is identical to an ASCII file containing the same sequence of characters. Even more importantly, forward compatibility is ensured as software that recognizes only 7-bit ASCII characters as special and does not alter bytes with the highest bit set (as is often done to support 8-bit ASCII extensions such as ISO-8859-1) will preserve UTF-8 data unchanged.

== See also ==
- 3568 ASCII – Asteroid
- Alt codes – Input method
- ASCII art – Computer art form using text characters
- ASCII ribbon campaign – Campaign for plain text (only) emails
- Basic Latin (Unicode block) – U+0000 until U+007F
- Extended ASCII – Nickname for 8-bit ASCII-derived character sets
- HTML decimal character rendering – Use of encoding systems for international characters in HTML
- Jargon file – Collection of definitions from computer subcultures
- Text file – Computer file containing plain text
- List of computer character sets
- List of Unicode characters
