= Epanorthosis =

Figure of speech that signifies emphatic word replacement

An epanorthosis is a figure of speech that signifies emphatic word replacement. "Thousands—no, millions!" is a stock example. Epanorthosis as immediate and emphatic self-correction often follows a Freudian slip (either accidental or deliberate).

== Etymology ==
The word epanorthosis, attested 1570, is from Ancient Greek epanórthōsis (ἐπανόρθωσις) "correcting, revision" < epí (ἐπί) + anorthóō (ἀνορθόω) "restore, rebuild" < ana- (ἀνα-) "up" + orthóō (ὀρθόω) "straighten" < orthós (ὀρθός) "straight, right" (hence to "straighten up").

== Examples ==
Epanorthoses may be spoken or written. When spoken, tone, emphasis, tempo and additional words may be used to signify the correction. The additional words can be interjections or explicitly corrective terms:

- "I've been doing this for six weeks!—er, DAYS, that is."
- "Do you have Battle Chess—scratch that, do you have Battletoads?"

Epanorthoses may also be euphemistic, or dysphemistic, replacing a less acceptable term with a more acceptable one, or vice versa:

- "Be nice to this fool^H^H^H^Hgentleman; he's visiting from corporate HQ." (Note: The colouring and link here are only additional visual cues for the reader, and not traditionally part of the ^H or ^W notation.)

=== Italics ===
In typeset literature, the use of italics is typical:

- "Seems, madam! Nay, it is; I know, not 'seems.'" (Hamlet, Act 1, Scene 2)
- "Man has parted company with his trusty friend the horse and has sailed into the azure with the eagles, eagles being represented by the infernal combustion engine–er er, internal combustion engine. [loud laughter] Internal combustion engine! Engine!" (Winston Churchill)
- "The psychologist known as Sigmund Fraud—Freud, I mean!"

The words in italics are technically the epanorthoses, but all the words following the dash may be considered part of the epanorthosis as well.

=== Strikethrough text ===
Striking through words is another way of signifying epanorthosis. Computerised communication clients with rich text, Unicode combining characters, or markup parsers available may allow users to compose strikethrough text:

- "We are feeling ~~terrible~~ fine."

=== Caret-control characters ===
An older, somewhat leet-like computer convention, using caret notation to denote control characters, is the use of ^H to suggest a backspace, or ^W to suggest deletion of the preceding word. The caret-notation characters may be repeated as necessary:

- "H^HWe always used COBOL^H^H^H^H."
- "Born to not^W rock the boat^W^W."

Sometimes repeated ^H's are used instead of ^W's, because the ^W-convention is less well known than the ^H.

=== Aviation phraseology ===
In Aviation English phraseology, the word "correction" must be explicitly used:

- "Climb to reach Flight Level 290 at time 58 — correction at time 55".
