= ISO 2047 =

Published standard

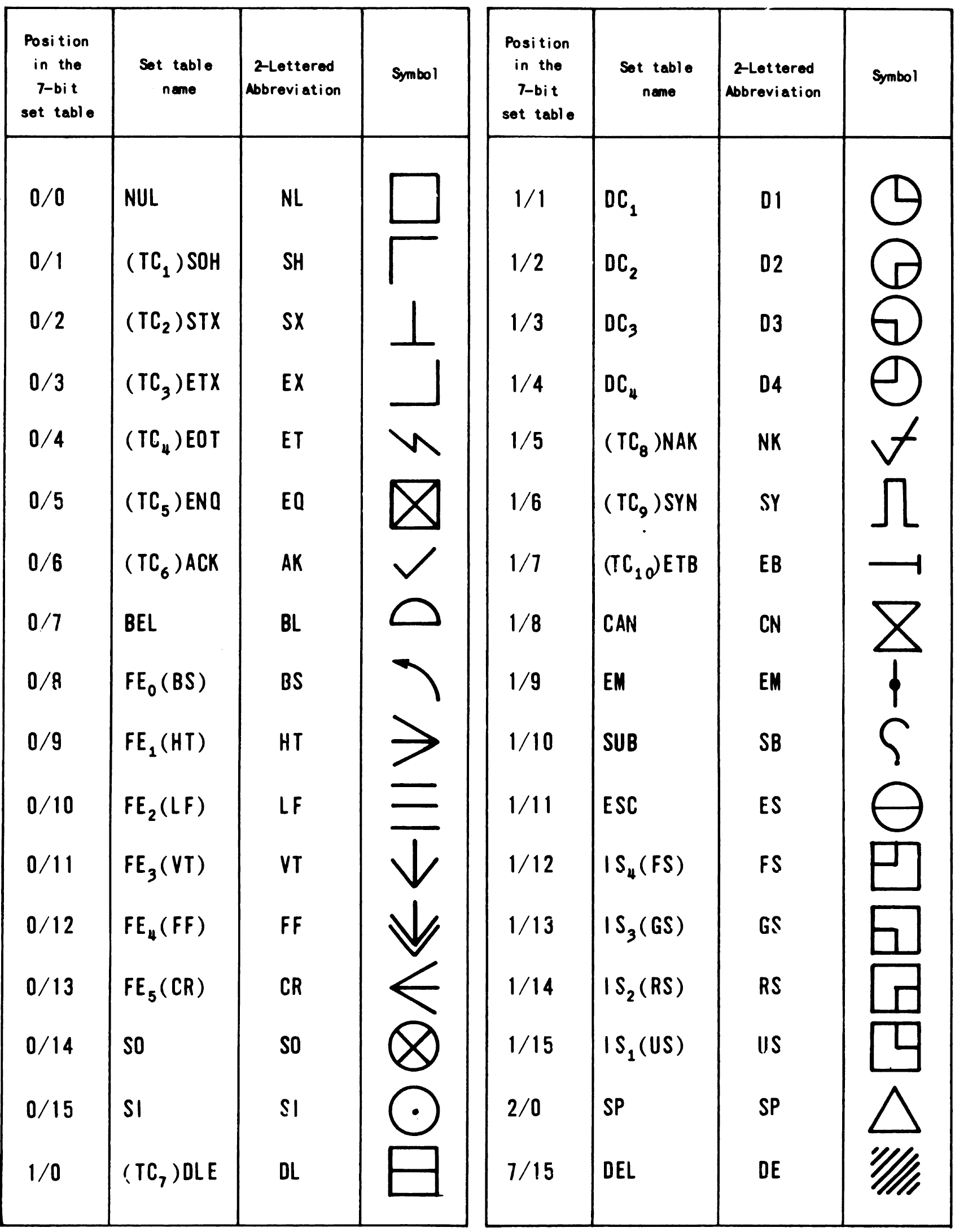
Early symbols assigned to the 32 control characters, space and delete characters. (ISO 2047, MIL-STD-188-100, 1972)

ISO 2047 (Information processing – Graphical representations for the control characters of the 7-bit coded character set) is a standard for graphical representation of the control characters for debugging purposes, such as may be found in the character generator of a computer terminal; it also establishes a two-letter abbreviation of each control character. The graphics and two-letter codes are essentially unchanged from the 1968 European standard ECMA-17 and the 1973 American standard ANSI X3.32-1973. It became an ISO standard in 1975. It is also standardized as GB/T 3911-1983 in China, as KS X 1010 in Korea (formerly KS C 5713), and was enacted in Japan as "graphical representation of information exchange capabilities for character" JIS X 0209:1976 (former JIS C 6227) (abolished January 20, 2010).

While the ISO/IEC 646 three-letter abbreviations (such as "ESC"), or caret notation (such as "^[") are still in use, the graphical symbols of ISO 2047 are considered outdated and rare.

== Character table ==
Code (hex)	Common abbreviation	Name	Symbol		2-letter abbreviation
00	NUL	Null	⎕	U+2395	NU
01	TC_{1}, SOH	Start of Heading	⌈	U+2308	SH
02	TC_{2}, STX	Start of Text	⊥	U+22A5	SX
03	TC_{3}, ETX	End of Text	⌋	U+230B	EX
04	TC_{4}, EOT	End of Transmission	⌁	U+2301	ET
05	TC_{5}, ENQ	Enquiry	⊠ (Note: In ISO 2047, ✠ is the primary glyph and ⊠ is only a fallback, but ECMA-17 lists only ⊠.)	U+22A0	EQ
06	TC_{6}, ACK	Acknowledge	✓	U+2713	AK
07	BEL	Bell	⍾	U+237E	BL
08	FE_{0}, BS	Backspace	⤺	— (Note: As a best-fit approximation ↖ could be used. Other defensible choices could be ⤺, ↰, ⮢, ⮪, ⮌ or ⮏.)	BS
09	FE_{1}, HT	Horizontal Tabulation	⪫	U+2AAB	HT
0A	FE_{2}, LF	Line Feed	≡	U+2261	LF
0B	FE_{3}, VT	Vertical Tabulation	⩛	U+2A5B	VT
0C	FE_{4}, FF	Form Feed	↡	U+21A1	FF
0D	FE_{5}, CR	Carriage Return	⪪	U+2AAA	CR
0E	SO	Shift Out	⊗	U+2297	SO
0F	SI	Shift In	⊙	U+2299	SI
10	TC_{7}, DLE	Data Link Escape	⊟	U+229F	DL
11	DC_{1}, XON, CON	Device Control 1	◷	U+25F7	D1
12	DC_{2}, RPT, TAPE (Note: On the Teletype Model 33 TAPE and ~~TAPE~~ would control the tape punch, whereas XON and XOFF would control the reader. ENQ was labelled WRU for 'who are you?')	Device Control 2	◶	U+25F6	D2
13	DC_{3}, XOF, XOFF	Device Control 3	◵	U+25F5	D3
14	DC_{4}, COF, KMC, ~~TAPE~~	Device Control 4	◴	U+25F4	D4
15	TC_{8}, NAK	Negative Acknowledge	⍻	U+237B	NK
16	TC_{9}, SYN	Synchronization	⎍	U+238D	SY
17	TC_{10}, ETB	End of Transmission Block	⊣	U+22A3	EB
18	CAN	Cancel	⧖	U+29D6	CN
19	EM	End of Medium	⍿	U+237F	EM
1A	SUB	Substitute Character	␦	U+2426	SB
1B	ESC	Escape	⊖	U+2296	EC
1C	IS_{4}, FS	File Separator	◰	U+25F0	FS
1D	IS_{3}, GS	Group Separator	◱	U+25F1	GS
1E	IS_{2}, RS	Record Separator	◲	U+25F2	RS
1F	IS_{1} US	Unit Separator	◳	U+25F3	US
20	SP	Space	△	U+25B3	SP
7F	DEL	Delete	▨	— (Note: As a best-fit approximation ▨, 🮙 or ␥ could be used.)	DT
