= Graphic character =

Encoded character that is associated with one or more glyphs

A graphic character, also known as a printing character or a printable character, is a grapheme intended to be rendered in a form that can be read by a human. In other words, it is any encoded character that is associated with one or more glyphs. (It is thus distinct from a control character, one that is acted upon and not displayed.)

== ISO/IEC 646 ==
In ASCII (specified in ISO/IEC 646), graphic characters are contained in rows 2 through 7 of the code table. However, two of the characters in these rows, namely the space character, SP, at row 2 column 0 and the delete character, DEL (also called the rubout character), at row 7 column 15 require special mention.

The space is considered to be both a graphic character and a control character in ISO 646. It can be considered as a character with a visible form or, in contexts such as teleprinters, a control character that advances the print head without printing a character.

The delete character is strictly a control character, not a graphic character. This is true not only in ISO 646 but also in all related standards including Unicode. However, many other character sets deviate from ISO 646, and as a result a graphic character might (Note: as is the case in code page 437 and related standards) occupy the position originally reserved for the delete character. (Note: This does not mean the delete character is absent; it just means 0x7F is overloaded, and outputting it will either print the graphical character or perform a deletion, depending on the routine used. For example in most BASIC implementations, using the PRINT command with 0x7F will delete, but using POKE will output the graphical character.)

== Unicode ==
In Unicode, Graphic characters are those with General Category Letter, Mark, Number, Punctuation, Symbol or Zs=space. Other code points (General categories Control, Zl=line separator, Zp=paragraph separator) are Format, Control, Private Use, Surrogate, Noncharacter or Reserved (unassigned).

== Spacing and non-spacing characters ==
Most graphic characters are spacing characters, which means that each instance of a spacing character has to occupy some area in a graphic representation. For a teletype or a typewriter this implies moving of the carriage after typing of a character. In the context of monospace typefaces (or computer fonts), each spacing character occupies one rectangular character box of equal sizes. (Note: Or maybe two adjacent ones, for non-alphabetic characters of East Asian languages). If a text is rendered using proportional fonts, widths of character boxes are not equal, but are positive.

There exist also non-spacing graphic characters. Most of the non-spacing characters are modifiers (called combining characters in Unicode), such as diacritical marks. Although non-spacing graphic characters are uncommon in traditional code pages, there are many such in Unicode. A combining character has its distinct mark, but it applies to a character box of another character, a spacing one. In some historical systems such as typewriters, this was implemented as 'backspace and overstrike'.

Note that not all modifiers are non-spacing – the Unicode block "Spacing Modifier Letters" list a number of others.
