= \b =

\b may refer to:

- Backspace, keyboard key
- Word boundary in regular expressions
