= Control character =

Code point in a character set, that does not represent a written symbol

In computing and telecommunications, a control character or non-printing character (NPC) is a code point in a character set that does not represent a written character or symbol. They are used as in-band signaling to cause effects other than the addition of a symbol to the text. All other characters are mainly graphic characters, except perhaps for space characters. In the ASCII standard, there are 33 control characters, such as code 7, BEL, which might ring a bell.

== History ==
Prosigns for Morse code are a form of control characters serving functions such as acknowledgement and flow control.

A form of control characters were introduced in the 1870 Baudot code: NUL and DEL. The 1901 Murray code added the carriage return (CR) and line feed (LF), and other versions of the Baudot code included other control characters.

The bell character (BEL), which rang a bell to alert operators, was also an early teletype control character.

Some control characters have also been called "format effectors".

== In ASCII ==
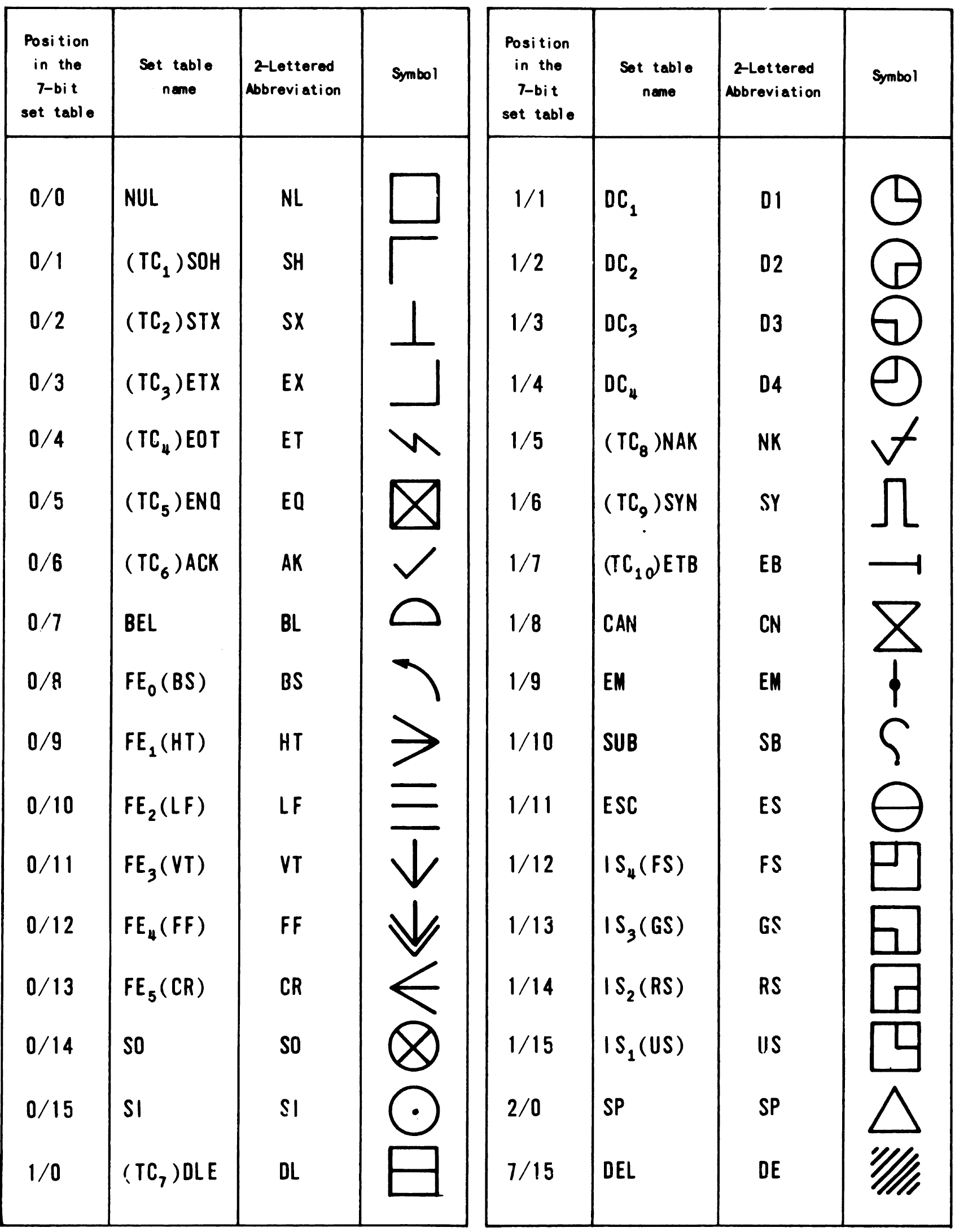
Early symbols assigned to the 32 control characters, space and delete characters. (ISO 2047, MIL-STD-188-100, 1972)

There were quite a few control characters defined (33 in ASCII, and ECMA-35 adds 32 more). This was because early terminals had very primitive mechanical or electrical controls that made any kind of state-remembering API quite expensive to implement, thus a different code for each and every function was a requirement. All entries in the ASCII table below code 32_{10} (technically the C0 control code set) are control characters, including CR and LF used to separate lines of text. The code 127_{10} (DEL) is also a control character.

Extended ASCII sets defined by ECMA-35 and ISO 8859 added the codes 128_{10} through 159_{10} as control characters. This was primarily done so that if the high bit was stripped, it would not change a printing character to a C0 control code. This second set is called the C1 set.

IBM's EBCDIC character set contains 65 control codes, including all of the ASCII C0 control codes plus additional codes which were not added to Unicode. There were also a number of attempts to define alternative sets of 32 control codes, none of these were transferred to Unicode either.

Only a small subset of the control characters are still in use for anything resembling their original purpose:

- 0x00 (null, NUL, \0, ^@), originally intended to be an ignored character, but now used by many programming languages including C to mark the end of a string.
- 0x04 (EOT, ^D) End Of File character on Unix terminals.
- 0x07 (bell, BEL, \a, ^G), which may cause the device to emit a warning such as a bell or beep sound or the screen flashing.
- 0x08 (backspace, BS, \b, ^H), may overprint the previous character.
- 0x09 (horizontal tab, HT, \t, ^I), moves the printing position right to the next tab stop.
- 0x0A (line feed, LF, \n, ^J), moves the print head down one line (and maybe to the left edge). Used as the end of line marker in Unix-like systems.
- 0x0B (vertical tab, VT, \v, ^K), vertical tabulation.
- 0x0C (form feed, FF, \f, ^L), to cause a printer to eject paper to the top of the next page, or a video terminal to clear the screen.
- 0x0D (carriage return, CR, \r, ^M), moves the printing position to the start of the line, allowing overprinting. Used as the end of line marker in Classic Mac OS, OS-9, FLEX (and variants). A CR+LF pair is used by CP/M-80 and its derivatives including MS-DOS and Windows.
- 0x1B (escape, ESC, \e (GCC only), ^[). Introduces an escape sequence.
- 0x1C (file separator, FS, ^\) ISO/IEC 10538 uses this as a "document terminator" code to indicate the end of text in a document.
- 0x1D (group separator, GS, ^]) ISO/IEC 10538 uses this as a "page terminator" code to indicate the end of text on a page.

Control characters may do something when the user inputs them, such as Ctrl+C (End-of-Text character, ETX) to interrupt the running process, and Ctrl+Z (Substitute character, SUB) for ending typed-in file on Windows. These uses usually have little to do with their ASCII definition. Modern systems often describe shortcuts as though they are control characters ("type a Ctrl+V to paste") but the code number is not even used to implement this.

== In Unicode ==
These 65 control codes were carried over to Unicode. "Control-characters" are U+0000—U+001F (C0 controls), U+007F (delete), and U+0080—U+009F (C1 controls). Their General Category is "Cc". The Cc control characters have no Name in Unicode, but are given labels such as "<control-001A>" instead.

Unicode added more characters (such as the zero-width non-joiner) that could be considered controls, but it makes a distinction between these "Formatting characters" and the 65 control characters. These are General Category "Cf" instead of "Cc".

== Display ==
There are a number of techniques to display non-printing characters, which may be illustrated with the bell character in ASCII encoding:

- Caret notation in ASCII using the nth letter of the alphabet: ^G
- An escape sequence, as in C/C++ character string codes: \a, \007, \x07, etc.
- An abbreviation, often three capital letters: BEL
- A Unicode character from the Control Pictures Unicode block that condenses the abbreviation: U+2407 ␇ SYMBOL FOR BELL
- An ISO 2047 graphical representation: U+237E ⍾ BELL SYMBOL

== How control characters map to keyboards ==
ASCII-based keyboards have a key labelled "Control", "Ctrl", or (rarely) "Cntl" which is used much like a shift key, being pressed in combination with another letter or symbol key. In one implementation, the control key generates the code 64 places below the code for the (generally) uppercase letter it is pressed in combination with (i.e., subtract 0x40 from ASCII code value of the (generally) uppercase letter). The other implementation is to take the ASCII code produced by the key and bitwise AND it with 0x1F, forcing bits 5 to 7 to zero. For example, pressing "control" and the letter "g" (which is 0110 0111 in binary), produces the code 7 (BELL, 7 in base ten, or 0000 0111 in binary). The NULL character (code 0) is represented by Ctrl-@, "@" being the code immediately before "A" in the ASCII character set. For convenience, some terminals accept Ctrl-Space as an alias for Ctrl-@. In either case, this produces one of the 32 ASCII control codes between 0 and 31. Neither approach works to produce the DEL character because of its special location in the table and its value (code 127_{10}), Ctrl-? is sometimes used for this character.

When the control key is held down, letter keys produce the same control characters regardless of the state of the shift or caps lock keys. In other words, it does not matter whether the key would have produced an upper-case or a lower-case letter. The interpretation of the control key with the space, graphics character, and digit keys (ASCII codes 32 to 63) varies between systems. Some will produce the same character code as if the control key were not held down. Other systems translate these keys into control characters when the control key is held down. The interpretation of the control key with non-ASCII ("foreign") keys also varies between systems.

Control characters are often rendered into a printable form known as caret notation by printing a caret (^) and then the ASCII character that has a value of the control character plus 64. Control characters generated using letter keys are thus displayed with the upper-case form of the letter. For example, ^G represents code 7, which is generated by pressing the G key when the control key is held down.

Keyboards also typically have a few single keys which produce control character codes. For example, the key labelled "Backspace" typically produces code 8, "Tab" code 9, "Enter" or "Return" code 13 (though some keyboards might produce code 10 for "Enter").

Many keyboards include keys that do not correspond to any ASCII printable or control character, for example cursor control arrows and word processing functions. The associated keypresses are communicated to computer programs by one of four methods: appropriating otherwise unused control characters; using some encoding other than ASCII; using multi-character control sequences; or using an additional mechanism outside of generating characters. "Dumb" computer terminals typically use control sequences. Keyboards attached to stand-alone personal computers made in the 1980s typically use one (or both) of the first two methods. Modern computer keyboards generate scancodes that identify the specific physical keys that are pressed; computer software then determines how to handle the keys that are pressed, including any of the four methods described above.

== Design purpose ==
The control characters were designed to fall into a few groups: printing and display control, data structuring, transmission control, and miscellaneous.

=== Printing and display control ===
Printing control characters were first used to control the physical mechanism of printers, the earliest output device. An early example of this idea was the use of Figures (FIGS) and Letters (LTRS) in Baudot code to shift between two code pages. A later, but still early, example was the out-of-band ASA carriage control characters. Later, control characters were integrated into the stream of data to be printed. The carriage return character (CR), when sent to such a device, causes it to put the character at the edge of the paper at which writing begins (it may, or may not, also move the printing position to the next line). The line feed character (LF/NL) causes the device to put the printing position on the next line. It may (or may not), depending on the device and its configuration, also move the printing position to the start of the next line (which would be the leftmost position for left-to-right scripts, such as the alphabets used for Western languages, and the rightmost position for right-to-left scripts such as the Hebrew and Arabic alphabets). The vertical and horizontal tab characters (VT and HT/TAB) cause the output device to move the printing position to the next tab stop in the direction of reading. The form feed character (FF/NP) starts a new sheet of paper, and may or may not move to the start of the first line. The backspace character (BS) moves the printing position one character space backwards. On printers, including hard-copy terminals, this is most often used so the printer can overprint characters to make other, not normally available, characters. On video terminals and other electronic output devices, there are often software (or hardware) configuration choices that allow a destructive backspace (e.g., a BS, SP, BS sequence), which erases, or a non-destructive one, which does not. The shift in and shift out characters (SI and SO) selected alternate character sets, fonts, underlining, or other printing modes. Escape sequences were often used to do the same thing.

With the advent of computer terminals that did not physically print on paper and so offered more flexibility regarding screen placement, erasure, and so forth, printing control codes were adapted. Form feeds, for example, usually cleared the screen, there being no new paper page to move to. More complex escape sequences were developed to take advantage of the flexibility of the new terminals, and indeed of newer printers. The concept of a control character had always been somewhat limiting, and was extremely so when used with new, much more flexible, hardware. Control sequences (sometimes implemented as escape sequences) could match the new flexibility and power and became the standard method. However, there were, and remain, a large variety of standard sequences to choose from.

=== Data structuring ===
The separators (File, Group, Record, and Unit: FS, GS, RS and US) were made to structure data, usually on a tape, in order to simulate punched cards. End of medium (EM) warns that the tape (or other recording medium) is ending. While many systems use CR/LF and TAB for structuring data, it is possible to encounter the separator control characters in data that needs to be structured. The separator control characters are not overloaded; there is no general use of them except to separate data into structured groupings. Their numeric values are contiguous with the space character, which can be considered a member of the group, as a word separator.

For example, the RS separator is used by RFC 7464 (JSON Text Sequences) to encode a sequence of JSON elements. Each sequence item starts with a RS character and ends with a line feed. This allows to serialize open-ended JSON sequences. It is one of the JSON streaming protocols.

=== Transmission control ===
The transmission control characters were intended to structure a data stream, and to manage re-transmission or graceful failure, as needed, in the face of transmission errors.

The start of heading (SOH) character was to mark a non-data section of a data stream—the part of a stream containing addresses and other housekeeping data. The start of text character (STX) marked the end of the header, and the start of the textual part of a stream. The end of text character (ETX) marked the end of the data of a message. A widely used convention is to make the two characters preceding ETX a checksum or CRC for error-detection purposes. The end of transmission block character (ETB) was used to indicate the end of a block of data, where data was divided into such blocks for transmission purposes.

The escape character (ESC) was intended to "quote" the next character, if it was another control character it would print it instead of performing the control function. It is almost never used for this purpose today. Various printable characters are used as visible "escape characters", depending on context.

The substitute character (SUB) was intended to request a translation of the next character from a printable character to another value, usually by setting bit 5 to zero. This is handy because some media (such as sheets of paper produced by typewriters) can transmit only printable characters. However, on MS-DOS systems with files opened in text mode, "end of text" or "end of file" is marked by this Ctrl-Z character, instead of the Ctrl-C or Ctrl-D, which are common on other operating systems.

The cancel character (CAN) signaled that the previous element should be discarded. The negative acknowledge character (NAK) is a definite flag for, usually, noting that reception was a problem, and, often, that the current element should be sent again. The acknowledge character (ACK) is normally used as a flag to indicate no problem detected with current element.

When a transmission medium is half duplex (that is, it can transmit in only one direction at a time), there is usually a master station that can transmit at any time, and one or more slave stations that transmit when they have permission. The enquire character (ENQ) is generally used by a master station to ask a slave station to send its next message. A slave station indicates that it has completed its transmission by sending the end of transmission character (EOT).

The device control codes (DC1 to DC4) were originally generic, to be implemented as necessary by each device. However, a universal need in data transmission is to request the sender to stop transmitting when a receiver is temporarily unable to accept any more data. Digital Equipment Corporation invented a convention which used 19 (the device control 3 character (DC3), also known as control-S, or XOFF) to "S"top transmission, and 17 (the device control 1 character (DC1), a.k.a. control-Q, or XON) to start transmission. It has become so widely used that most don't realize it is not part of official ASCII. This technique, however implemented, avoids additional wires in the data cable devoted only to transmission management, which saves money. A sensible protocol for the use of such transmission flow control signals must be used, to avoid potential deadlock conditions, however.

The data link escape character (DLE) was intended to be a signal to the other end of a data link that the following character is a control character such as STX or ETX. For example a packet may be structured in the following way (DLE) <STX> <PAYLOAD> (DLE) <ETX>.

=== Miscellaneous codes ===
Code 7 (BEL) is intended to cause an audible signal in the receiving terminal.

Many of the ASCII control characters were designed for devices of the time that are not often seen today. For example, code 22, "synchronous idle" (SYN), was originally sent by synchronous modems (which have to send data constantly) when there was no actual data to send. (Modern systems typically use a start bit to announce the beginning of a transmitted word— this is a feature of asynchronous communication. Synchronous communication links were more often seen with mainframes, where they were typically run over corporate leased lines to connect a mainframe to another mainframe or perhaps a minicomputer.)

Code 0 (ASCII code name NUL) is a special case. In paper tape, it is the case when there are no holes. It is convenient to treat this as a fill character with no meaning otherwise. Since the position of a NUL character has no holes punched, it can be replaced with any other character at a later time, so it was typically used to reserve space, either for correcting errors or for inserting information that would be available at a later time or in another place. In computing, it is often used for padding in fixed length records; to mark the end of a string; and formerly to give printing devices enough time to execute a control function.

Code 127 (DEL, a.k.a. "rubout") is likewise a special case. Its 7-bit code is all-bits-on in binary, which essentially erased a character cell on a paper tape when overpunched. Paper tape was a common storage medium when ASCII was developed, with a computing history dating back to WWII code breaking equipment at Biuro Szyfrów. Paper tape became obsolete in the 1970s, so this aspect of ASCII rarely saw any use after that. Some systems (such as the original Apple computers) converted it to a backspace. But because its code is in the range occupied by other printable characters, and because it had no official assigned glyph, many computer equipment vendors used it as an additional printable character (often an all-black box character useful for erasing text by overprinting with ink).

Non-erasable programmable ROMs are typically implemented as arrays of fusible elements, each representing a bit, which can only be switched one way, usually from one to zero. In such PROMs, the DEL and NUL characters can be used in the same way that they were used on punched tape: one to reserve meaningless fill bytes that can be written later, and the other to convert written bytes to meaningless fill bytes. For PROMs that switch one to zero, the roles of NUL and DEL are reversed; also, DEL will only work with 7-bit characters, which are rarely used today; for 8-bit content, the character code 255, commonly defined as a nonbreaking space character, can be used instead of DEL.

Many file systems do not allow control characters in filenames, as they may have reserved functions.

== See also ==
- Arrow keys § HJKL keys, HJKL as arrow keys, used on ADM-3A terminal
- C0 and C1 control codes – Computer control characters
- Escape sequence – Series of characters with a special meaning
- Implicit directional marks – Control characters in bidirectional text
- In-band signaling – Sending control flow information in the same channel as data
- Whitespace character – Computer text file character representing blank space
