= EBCDIC =

Eight-bit character encoding system invented by IBM

EBCDIC encoding family
- Classification: 8-bit basic Latin encodings (non‑ASCII)
- Preceded by: BCD

Extended Binary Coded Decimal Interchange Code (EBCDIC; /ˈɛbsɪdɪk/) is an eight-bit character encoding used mainly on IBM mainframe and IBM midrange computer operating systems. It descended from the code used with punched cards and the corresponding six-bit binary-coded decimal code used with most of IBM's computer peripherals of the late 1950s and early 1960s. It is supported by various non-IBM platforms, such as Fujitsu-Siemens' BS2000/OSD, OS-IV, MSP, and MSP-EX, the SDS Sigma series, Unisys VS/9, Unisys MCP and ICL VME.

== History ==
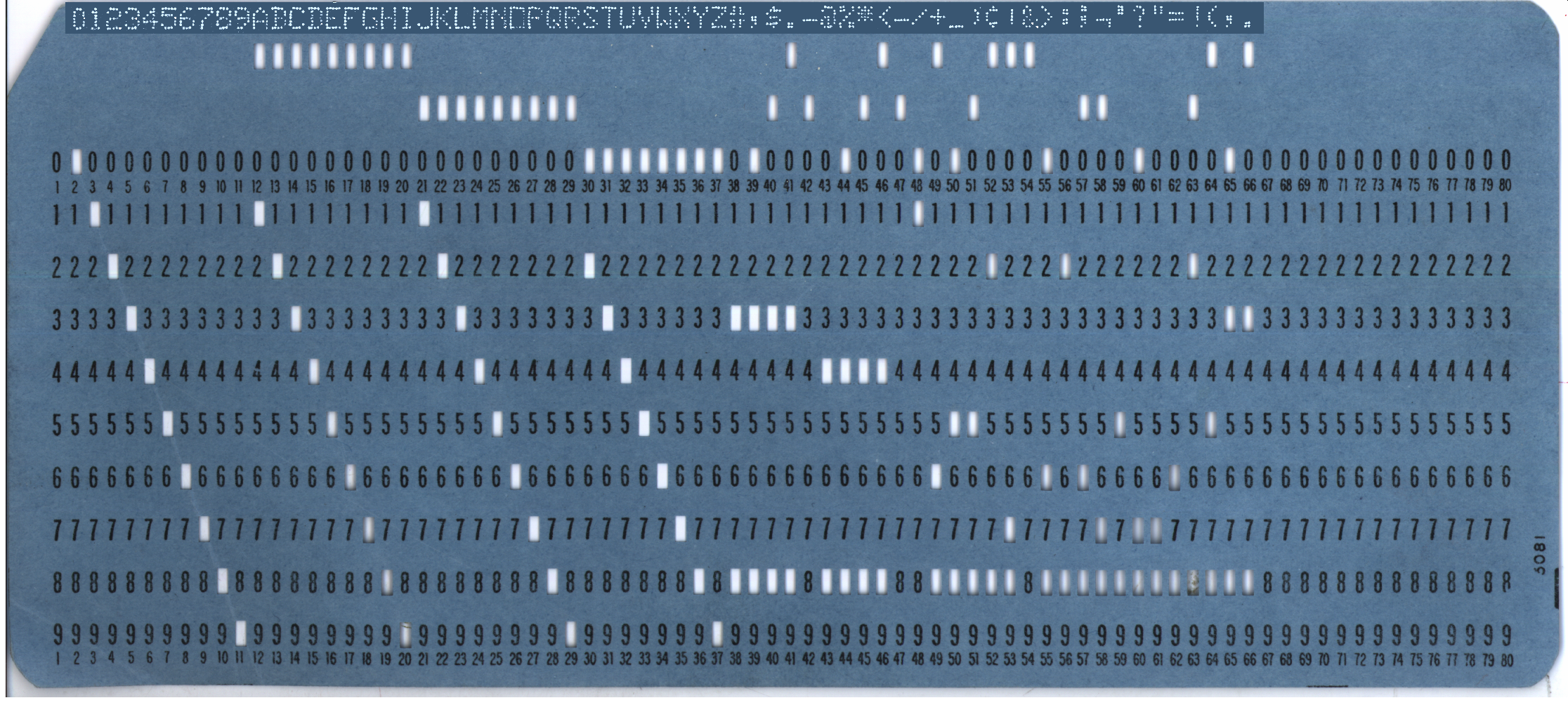
Punched card with the Hollerith encoding of the 1964 EBCDIC character set. Contrast at the top is enhanced to show the printed characters. The "number" punches (0–9) directly translate to the lower 4 bits of EBCDIC, though the upper 4 bits of EBCDIC are more complex.

EBCDIC was devised in 1963 and 1964 by IBM and was announced with the release of the IBM System/360 line of mainframe computers. It is an eight-bit character encoding, developed separately from the seven-bit ASCII encoding scheme. It was created to extend the existing Binary-Coded Decimal (BCD) Interchange Code, or BCDIC, which itself was devised as an efficient means of encoding the two zone and number punches on punched cards into six bits. The distinct encoding of 's' and 'S' (using position 2 instead of 1) was maintained from punched cards where it was desirable not to have hole punches too close to each other to ensure the integrity of the physical card.

While IBM was a chief proponent of the ASCII standardization committee, the company did not have time to prepare ASCII peripherals (such as card punch machines) to ship with its System/360 computers, so the company settled on EBCDIC. The System/360 became wildly successful, together with clones such as RCA Spectra 70, ICL System 4, and Fujitsu FACOM, thus so did EBCDIC.

All IBM's mainframe operating systems, and its IBM i operating system for midrange computers, use EBCDIC as their inherent encoding (with toleration for ASCII, for example, ISPF in z/OS can browse and edit both EBCDIC and ASCII encoded files). Software can translate to and from encodings, and modern mainframes (such as IBM Z) include processor instructions, at the hardware level, to accelerate translation between character sets. Modern z/OS compilers for the C and C++ languages on IBM Z mainframes, and earlier OS/390 C and C++ compilers on IBM System/390 mainframes, support a POSIX-compatible execution environment that makes use of ASCII by default.

Not all operating systems running on IBM hardware use EBCDIC; IBM AIX, Linux on IBM Z, and Linux on Power all use ASCII, as do all operating systems that run on the IBM Personal Computer and its successors.

== Compatibility with ASCII ==
There are numerous difficulties to writing software that would work in both ASCII and EBCDIC.

- The gaps between letters makes simple code that worked in ASCII fail on EBCDIC. For example for (c = 'A'; c <= 'Z'; ++c) putchar(c); would print the letters from A to Z if ASCII is used, but print 41 characters (including a number of unassigned ones) in EBCDIC.
- Sorting EBCDIC puts lowercase letters before uppercase letters and letters before numbers, exactly the opposite of ASCII.
- Many programming languages and file formats and network protocols designed for ASCII use available punctuation marks (such as caret ^, tilde ~, square brackets, and the curly braces { and }) that did not exist in EBCDIC, making translation to EBCDIC systems difficult. Workarounds such as trigraphs were used. Conversely EBCDIC had some characters such as ¬ logical not, ¢ (US cent) that were used on IBM systems and could not be translated to ASCII. The logical not character is used in the PL/I programming language, and some other IBM languages.
- The EBCDIC character NL (next line) is best treated as the ASCII LF, but, as EBCDIC also contains a character called LF, this is not always done consistently.
- If seven-bit ASCII is used, there was an "unused" high bit in 8-bit bytes, and many pieces of software stored other information there. Software would also pack the seven bits and discard the eighth, such as packing five seven-bit ASCII characters in a 36-bit word. On the PDP-11, bytes with the high bit set were treated as negative numbers, behavior that was copied to C, causing unexpected problems if the high bit was set. These all made it difficult to switch from ASCII to the 8-bit EBCDIC (and also made it difficult to switch to 8-bit extended ASCII encodings).

== Code page layout ==
There are hundreds of EBCDIC code pages based on the original EBCDIC character encoding; these are intended for use in different parts of the world, including code pages for non-Latin scripts such as Chinese, Japanese (e.g., EBCDIC 930, JEF, and KEIS), Korean, and Greek (EBCDIC 875). There is also a huge number of variations with the letters swapped around for no discernible reason.

The table below shows the "invariant subset" of EBCDIC, which are characters that should have the same assignments on all EBCDIC code pages that use the Latin alphabet. (This includes most of the ISO/IEC 646 invariant repertoire, except the exclamation mark.) It also shows (in gray) missing ASCII and EBCDIC punctuation, located where they are in Code Page 37 (one of the code page variants of EBCDIC). The blank cells are filled with region-specific characters in the variants, but the characters in gray are often swapped around or replaced as well. Like ASCII, the invariant subset works only for languages using only the ISO basic Latin alphabet, such as English.

EBCDIC
	0	1	2	3	4	5	6	7	8	9	A	B	C	D	E	F
0x	NUL	SOH	STX	ETX	SEL	HT	RNL	DEL	GE	SPS	RPT	VT	FF	CR	SO	SI
1x	DLE	DC1	DC2	DC3	RES/ ENP	NL	BS	POC	CAN	EM	UBS	CU1	IFS	IGS	IRS	IUS/ ITB
2x	DS	SOS.	FDS	WUS	BYP/ INP	LF	ETB	ESC	SA	SFE	SM/ SW	CSP	MFA	ENQ	ACK	BEL
3x			SYN	IR	PP	TRN	NBS	EOT	SBS	IT	RFF	CU3	DC4	NAK		SUB
4x	SP										¢	.	<	(	+	|
5x	&										!	$	*	)	;	¬
6x	-	/									¦	,	%	_	>	?
7x										`	:	#	@	'	=	"
8x		a	b	c	d	e	f	g	h	i						±
9x		j	k	l	m	n	o	p	q	r						
Ax		~	s	t	u	v	w	x	y	z						
Bx											[	]				
Cx	{	A	B	C	D	E	F	G	H	I						
Dx	}	J	K	L	M	N	O	P	Q	R						
Ex	\		S	T	U	V	W	X	Y	Z						
Fx	0	1	2	3	4	5	6	7	8	9						EO

== Definitions of non-ASCII EBCDIC controls ==
Following are the definitions of EBCDIC control characters which either do not map onto the ASCII control characters, or have additional uses. When mapped to Unicode, these are mostly mapped to C1 control character codepoints in a manner specified by IBM's Character Data Representation Architecture (CDRA).

Although the default mapping of New Line (NL) corresponds to the ISO/IEC 6429 Next Line character (NEL, U+0085, the behaviour of which is also specified, but not required, in Unicode Annex 14), most of these C1-mapped controls match neither those in the ISO/IEC 6429 C1 set, nor those in other registered C1 control sets such as ISO 6630. Although this effectively makes the non-ASCII EBCDIC controls a unique C1 control set, they are not among the C1 control sets registered in the ISO-IR registry, meaning that they do not have an assigned control set designation sequence (as specified by ISO/IEC 2022, and optionally permitted in ISO/IEC 10646 (Unicode)).

Besides U+0085 (Next Line), the Unicode Standard does not prescribe an interpretation of C1 control characters, leaving their interpretation to higher level protocols (it suggests, but does not require, their ISO/IEC 6429 interpretations in the absence of use for other purposes), so this mapping is permissible in, but not specified by, Unicode.

EBCDIC control codes without ASCII equivalents
Mnemonic	EBCDIC	CDRA pairing	Name	Description
SEL	04	009C	Select	Device control character taking a single-byte parameter. For example, when followed by a byte in the range 0x81–89 or 0x7A–7C, this is used for Vertical Channel Select (VCS), where bytes 0x81–89 correspond to the first nine channels (the top margin and the first eight vertical tab stops) respectively, and bytes 0x7A–7C correspond to the next three vertical tab stops respectively.
PF	04	009C	Punch Off	Listed in this location by GOST 19768-93.
RNL	06	0086	Required New Line	Line-break resetting Indent Tab mode
LC	06	0086	Lower Case	Listed in this location by GOST 19768-93.
GE	08	0097	Graphic Escape	Non-locking shift that changes the interpretation of the following character (see e.g. Code page 310). Compare ISO/IEC 6429's SS2 (008E).
SPS	09	008D	Superscript	Begin superscript or undo subscript. Compare ISO/IEC 6429's PLU (008C).
RPT	0A	008E	Repeat	Switch to an operation mode repeating a print buffer
SMM	0A	008E	Start of Manual Message	Listed in this location by GOST 19768-93.
RES/ENP	14	009D	Restore, Enable Presentation	Resume output (after BYP/INP)
NL	15	0085 (000A)	New Line	Line break. Default mapping (0085) matches ISO/IEC 6429's NEL. Mappings sometimes swapped with Line Feed (EBCDIC 0x25) in accordance with UNIX line breaking convention.
POC	17	0087	Program Operator Communication	Followed by two one-byte operators that identify the specific function, for example a light or function key. Contrast with ISO/IEC 6429's CSI (009B), OSC (009D) and APC (009F).
IL	17	0087	Idle	Listed in this location by GOST 19768-93.
UBS	1A	0092	Unit Backspace	A fractional backspace.
CC	1A	0092	Cursor Control	Listed in this location by GOST 19768-93.
CU1	1B	008F	Customer Use One	Not used by IBM; for customer use.
IUS/ITB	1F	001F	Interchange Unit Separator, Intermediate Transmission Block	Either used as an information separator to terminate a block called a "unit" (as in ASCII; see also IR), or used as a transmission control code to delimit the end of an intermediate block.
DS	20	0080	Digit Select	Used by S/360 CPU edit (ED) instruction
SOS	21	0081	Start of Significance	Used by S/360 CPU edit (ED) instruction. (Note: different from ISO/IEC 6429's SOS; where distinguishing them is necessary, IBM abbreviates Start of Significance as SOS. (with a dot) and Start of String as SOS, otherwise they are abbreviated the same.)
FS, FDS	22	0082	Field Separator	Used by S/360 CPU edit (ED) instruction. (Note: (Interchange) File Separator, as abbreviated FS in ASCII, is at 0x1C and abbreviated IFS.)
WUS	23	0083	Word Underscore	Underscores the immediately preceding word. Contrast with ISO/IEC 6429's SGR.
BYP/INP	24	0084	Bypass, Inhibit Presentation	De-activates output, i.e. ignores all graphical characters and control characters besides transmission control codes and RES/ENP, until the next RES/ENP.
SA	28	0088	Set Attribute	Marks the beginning of a fixed-length device-specific control sequence. (Note: Specific control sequences using this control code byte include: Reset: 0x28 0x00 0x00, to clear all attributes currently set; Highlight: 0x28 0x41 V, where V is 0x00 for normal, 0xF1 for blinking, 0xF2 for swapped foreground/background colors, or 0xF4 for underlined.; Color: 0x28 0x42 V, where V is 0x00 for the default foreground color, 0xF1 for blue, 0xF2 for red, 0xF3 for magenta, 0xF4 for green, 0xF5 for cyan, 0xF6 for yellow, or 0xF7 for black.; Select Character Set: 0x28 0x43 V, where V is 0x00 for the base character set, and 0xF1 for the APL character set.) Deprecated in favour of CSP. Contrast with ISO/IEC 6429's SGR.
SFE	29	0089	Start Field Extended	Marks the beginning of a variable-length device specific control sequence. Deprecated in favour of CSP.
SM/SW	2A	008A	Set Mode, Switch	Device specific control that sets a mode of operation, such as a buffer switch.
CU2	2B	008B	Customer Use Two	This appears in some specifications, such as GOST 19768-93; newer IBM specifications for EBCDIC control codes list only CU1 and CU3 as customer-use, and use this position for CSP.
CSP	2B	008B	Control Sequence Prefix	Marks the beginning of a variable-length device specific control sequence. See below for details. Contrast with ISO/IEC 6429's DCS (0090) and CSI (009B).
MFA	2C	008C	Modify Field Attribute	Marks the beginning of a variable-length device specific control sequence. Deprecated in favour of CSP.
	30	0090	(reserved)	Reserved for future use by IBM
	31	0091	(reserved)	Reserved for future use by IBM
IR	33	0093	Index Return	Either move to start of next line (see also NL), or terminate an information unit (see also IUS/ITB).
PP	34	0094	Presentation Position	Followed by two one-byte parameters (function and position number respectively) to set the current position. Function byte is 0x4C for a relative downward position, 0xC0 for an absolute horizontal position, 0xC4 for an absolute vertical position, or 0xC8 for a relative rightward position. Contrast with ISO/IEC 6429's CUP and HVP.
PN	34	0094	Punch On	Listed in this location by GOST 19768-93.
TRN	35	0095	Transparent	Followed by one byte parameter that indicates the number of bytes of transparent data that follow.
RST	35	0095	Reader Stop	Listed in this location by GOST 19768-93.
NBS	36	0096	Numeric Backspace	Move backward the width of one digit.
UC	36	0096	Upper Case	Listed in this location by GOST 19768-93.
SBS	38	0098	Subscript	Begin subscript or undo superscript. Compare ISO/IEC 6429's PLD (008B).
IT	39	0099	Indent Tab	Indents the current and all following lines, until RNL or RFF is encountered.
RFF	3A	009A	Required Form Feed	Page-break resetting Indent Tab mode.
CU3	3B	009B	Customer Use Three	Not used by IBM; for customer use.
	3E	009E	(reserved)	Reserved for future use by IBM
EO	FF	009F	Eight Ones	All ones character used as filler

=== Control Sequence Prefix sequences ===
Control Sequence Prefix (CSP) (0x2B, mapped to U+008B in CDRA) marks the beginning of a variable-length device specific control sequence. It is followed by a class byte specifying a category of control function, followed by a count byte giving the sequence length (including the count byte onwards, but not the class byte or the initial CSP). The count byte may be followed by a type byte identifying a control function within that category, and/or zero or more parameter bytes. Contrast with ISO/IEC 6429's DCS and CSI.

Specific control sequences using CSP include:

EBCDIC multi-byte control sequences prefixed with CSP
Mnemonic	Class byte	Type byte	Name	Description
SHF	0xC1	(none)	Set Horizontal Format	Sets the left and right page margins and the horizontal tab positions. Contrast with ISO/IEC 6429's HTS.
SVF	0xC2	(none)	Set Vertical Format	Sets the top and bottom page margins and the vertical tab positions. Contrast with ISO/IEC 6429's VTS.
SLD	0xC6	(none)	Set Line Density	Parameter 0x00 for default, or else equal to the desired line height in points.
STO	0xD1	0x83	Set Text Orientation	
BES	0xD1	0x8A	Begin Emphasis	Enables boldface
EES	0xD1	0x8E	End Emphasis	Disables boldface
STAB	0xD2	0x01	Set Horizontal Tab Stops	Sets the horizontal tab positions. Contrast with ISO/IEC 6429's HTS.
SIL	0xD2	0x07	Set Indent Level	Sets left indent to the tab-stop numbered by the single-byte parameter value, or to the left margin if zero.
SJM	0xD2	0x0D	Set Justify Mode	First one byte parameter is 0 to disable text justification and 1 to enable. Optional second one-byte parameter is a justification percentage.
SHM	0xD2	0x11	Set Horizontal Margins	Two 16-bit signed integer parameters, setting the left and right margins respectively in 1440ths of an inch from the left edge. Zero leaves the margin in question unchanged.
SPD; SCD	0xD2	0x29	Set Print Density; Set Character Distance	Optional parameter is a two-byte big-endian integer (of which the first byte is always zero in practice) giving a number of characters per horizontal inch for a monospace font. Zero is interpreted as default or as unchanged. On some systems, 255 (0x00FF) resets to the default, and 11 (0x000B) selects a proportional-width font.
SPPS	0xD2	0x40	Set Presentation Page Size	Two signed 16-bit integer parameters (page logical width and logical height) in 1440ths of an inch.
SIC	0xD2	0x45	Set Initial Conditions	One-byte parameter is 255 to reset to data processing defaults, or 1 to reset to word processing defaults. Compare with ISO/IEC 6429's RIS.
PPM	0xD2	0x48	Page Presentation Media	Specifies which tray a printer should source paper from, and whether to enable duplex printing.
SVM	0xD2	0x49	Set Vertical Margins	Two 16-bit signed integer parameters, setting the top and bottom margins respectively in 1440ths of an inch from the top edge. Zero leaves the margin in question unchanged.
SPSU	0xD2	0x4C	Set Printer Setup	Specifies which tray a printer should source paper from.
SEA	0xD2	0x85	Set Exception Action	Configures whether to cease operation and/or display an error message upon particular error types.
BUS	0xD4	0x0A	Begin Underscore	Enables underlining.
EUS	0xD4	0x0E	End Underscore	Disables underlining.
ATRN	0xFE	0x35	ASCII Transparent	

== Code pages with Latin-1 character sets ==
The following code pages have the full Latin-1 character set (ISO/IEC 8859-1). The first column gives the original code page number. The second column gives the number of the code page updated with the euro sign (€) replacing the universal currency sign (¤) (or in the case of EBCDIC 924, with the set changed to match ISO 8859-15)

Different countries have different code pages because these code pages originated as code pages with country-specific character repertoires, and were later expanded to contain the entire ISO 8859-1 repertoire, meaning that a given ISO 8859-1 character may have different code point values in different code pages. They are known as Country Extended Code Pages (CECPs).

CCSID	Euro update	Countries
037	1140	Australia, Brazil, Canada, New Zealand, Portugal, South Africa, USA
273	1141	Austria, Germany
277	1142	Denmark, Norway
278	1143	Finland, Sweden
280	1144	Italy
284	1145	Latin America, Spain
285	1146	Ireland, United Kingdom
297	1147	France
500	1148	International
871	1149	Iceland
1047	924	Open Systems (MVS C compiler)

== Criticism and humor ==
Open-source software advocate and software developer Eric S. Raymond writes in his Jargon File that EBCDIC was loathed by hackers, by which he meant members of a subculture of enthusiastic programmers. What is known as vendor lock-in today, is jokingly criticized in The Jargon File with the following definition:

EBCDIC: /eb´s@·dik/, /eb´see`dik/, /eb´k@·dik/, n. [abbreviation, Extended Binary Coded Decimal Interchange Code] An alleged character set used on IBM dinosaurs. It exists in at least six mutually incompatible versions, all featuring such delights as non-contiguous letter sequences and the absence of several ASCII punctuation characters fairly important for modern computer languages (exactly which characters are absent varies according to which version of EBCDIC you're looking at). IBM adapted EBCDIC from punched card code in the early 1960s and promulgated it as a customer-control tactic (see connector conspiracy), spurning the already established ASCII standard. Today, IBM claims to be an open-systems company, but IBM's own description of the EBCDIC variants and how to convert between them is still internally classified top-secret, burn-before-reading. Hackers blanch at the very name of EBCDIC and consider it a manifestation of purest evil.

— The Jargon file 4.4.7

EBCDIC design was the source of many jokes. One such joke, found in the Unix fortune file of 4.3BSD Reno (1990) went:

Professor: "So the American government went to IBM to come up with an encryption standard, and they came up with—"
Student: "EBCDIC!"

References to the EBCDIC character set are made in the 1979 computer game series Zork. In the "Machine Room" in Zork II, EBCDIC is used to imply an incomprehensible language:

This is a large room full of assorted heavy machinery, whirring noisily. The room smells of burned resistors. Along one wall are three buttons which are, respectively, round, triangular, and square. Naturally, above these buttons are instructions written in EBCDIC...

In 2021, it became public that a Belgian bank was still using EBCDIC internally in 2019. A customer insisted that the correct spelling of his surname included an umlaut, which the bank omitted, and the customer filed a complaint citing the guarantee in the General Data Protection Regulation of the right to timely "rectification of inaccurate personal data." The bank's argument included the fact that their system used EBCDIC, as well as that it did not support letters with diacritics (or lower case, for that matter). The appeals court ruled in favor of the customer.

== See also ==
- UTF-EBCDIC
