= Eight Ones =

EBCDIC character code

EO, or Eight Ones, is an 8-bit EBCDIC character code represented as all ones (binary 1111 1111, hexadecimal FF).

== As a control code ==
Eight Ones, as an EBCDIC control code, is used for synchronisation purposes, such as a time and media filler. In Advanced Function Presentation code page definition resource headers, setting at least the first two bytes of the field for the eight-byte code page resource name (which is encoded in code page 500) to Eight Ones (0xFF) constitutes a "null name", which is treated as unset.

=== Mapping ===
When translated from the EBCDIC character set to code pages with a C1 control code set, Eight Ones is typically mapped to hexadecimal code 0x9F, in order to provide a unique character mapping in both directions. Prior to 1986, however, the C1 control code 0x9F was usually mapped to EBCDIC 0xE1, which was frequently used as a numeric (figure) space in code pages at the time (including the pre-1986 version of code page 37). The Unix dd utility follows the earlier convention, mapping the C1 code 0x9F to EBCDIC 0xE1, and mapping 0xFF (Eight Ones) to 0xFF.

== As a graphical character ==
While Eight Ones is treated as a control code by IBM EBCDIC infrastructure, EBCDIC code pages from Fujitsu Siemens used on the BS2000 system frequently use it for a graphical character, most often the tilde. In these cases, the C1 control code 0x9F is mapped to a different location in the EBCDIC code page, most commonly 0x5F.

== See also ==
- 0xFF
- Delete character
