= ASCII ribbon campaign =

Campaign for plain text (only) emails

The ASCII ribbon campaign was an Internet phenomenon started in 1998 advocating that email be sent only in plain text, because of inefficiencies or dangers of using HTML email. Proponents placed ASCII art in their signature blocks, meant to look like an awareness ribbon, along with a message or link to an advocacy site:

()  ascii ribbon campaign - against HTML e-mail 
/\  www.asciiribbon.org   - against proprietary attachments

                       _
ASCII ribbon campaign ( )
 against HTML e-mail   X
                      / \

/"\
\ /  ASCII Ribbon Campaign
 X    against HTML e-mail
/ \

== History ==
Following the development of Microsoft Windows 95, standards adherents became annoyed that they were receiving email in HTML and non-human-readable formats. The first known appearance of a ribbon in support of the campaign was in the signature of an email dated 17 June 1998 by Maurício Teixeira of Brazil. Two groups of pursuers, Asciiribbon.org and ARC.Pasp.DE, differ in their attitudes towards vCard.

== See also ==
- Simple Mail Transfer Protocol
- MIME
