= Backspace =

Key on a keyboard

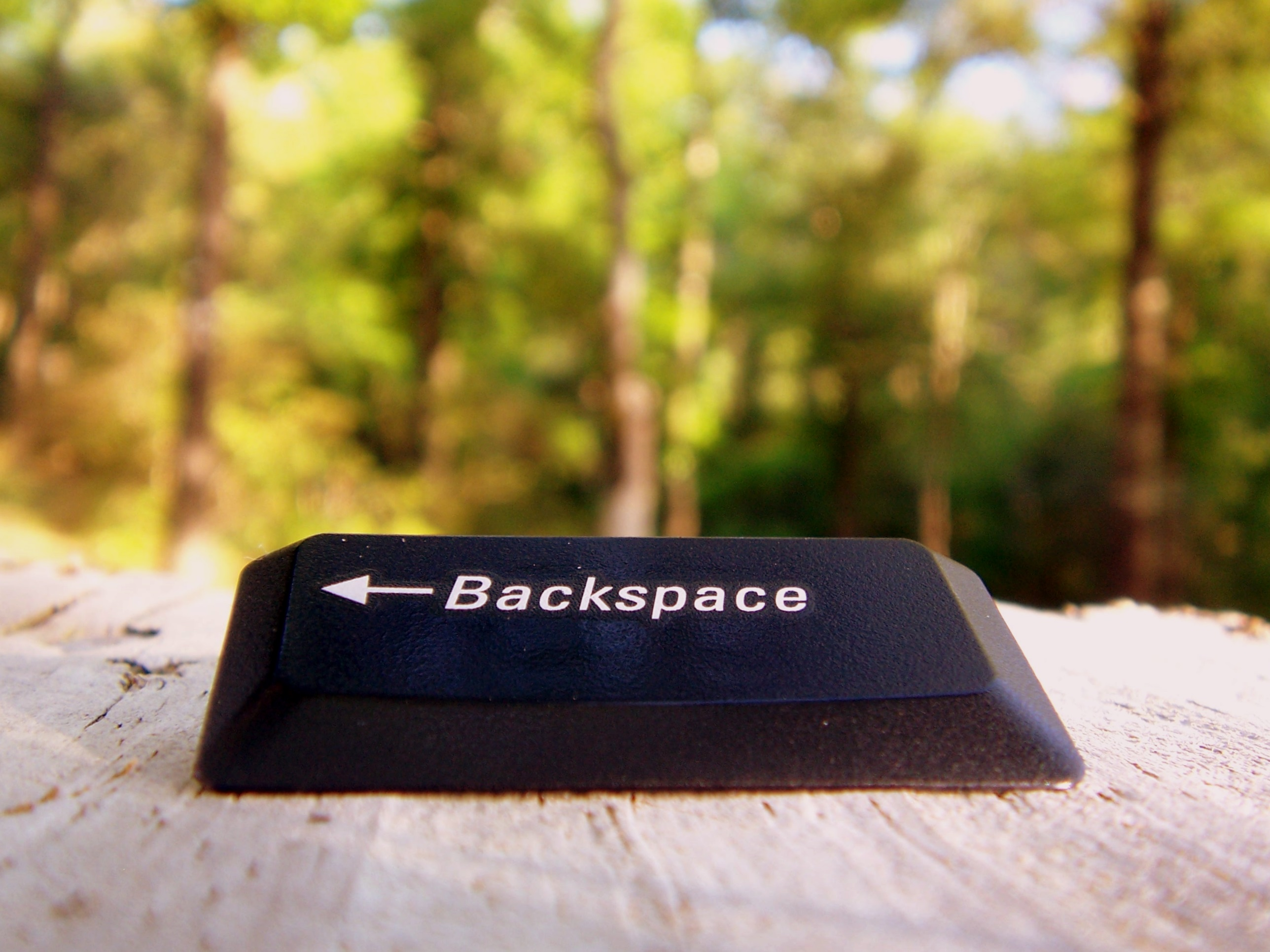
A backspace key

Backspace (← Backspace, ⌫) is the keyboard key that in typewriters originally pushed the carriage one position backwards. In modern computer systems, it typically moves the display cursor one position backwards, (Note: The meaning of "backwards" depends on the direction of the text, and could get complicated in text involving several bidirectional categories.) deletes the character at that position, and shifts back any text after (Note: "after" here implies on the same logical line of text) that position by one character.

== Nomenclature ==
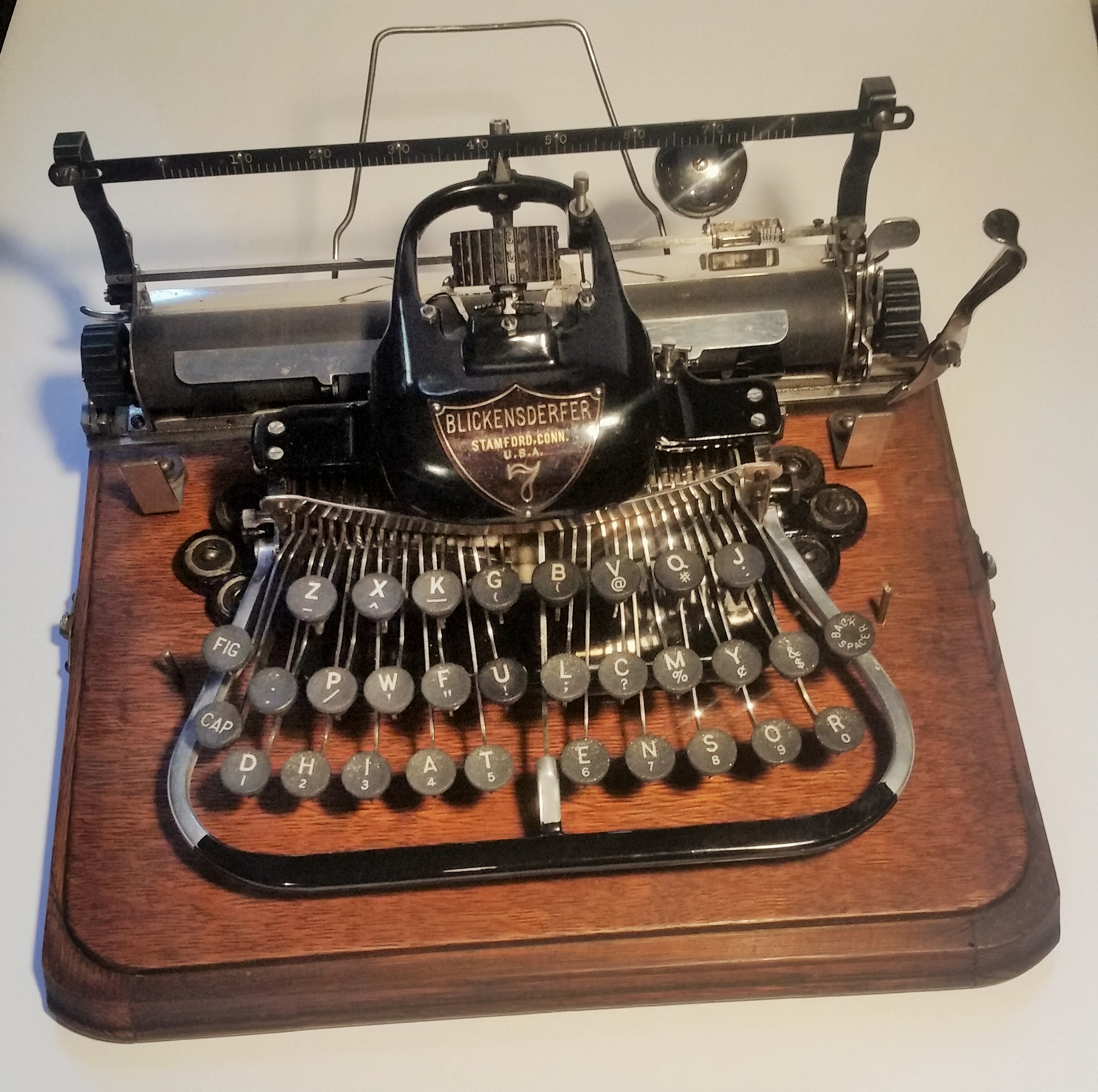
An early typewriter with a backspacer [sic] key. (Blickensderfer Model 7)

Although the term "backspace" is the traditional name of the key which steps the carriage back and/or (Note: in some correcting typewriters it did both.) deletes the previous character, the actual key may be labeled in a variety of ways—for example delete, erase, (Note: for example in One Laptop Per Child) or with a left pointing arrow. Some very early typewriters labeled this key the backspacer key. A dedicated symbol for "backspace" exists as U+232B ⌫ ERASE TO THE LEFT but its use as a keyboard label is not universal.

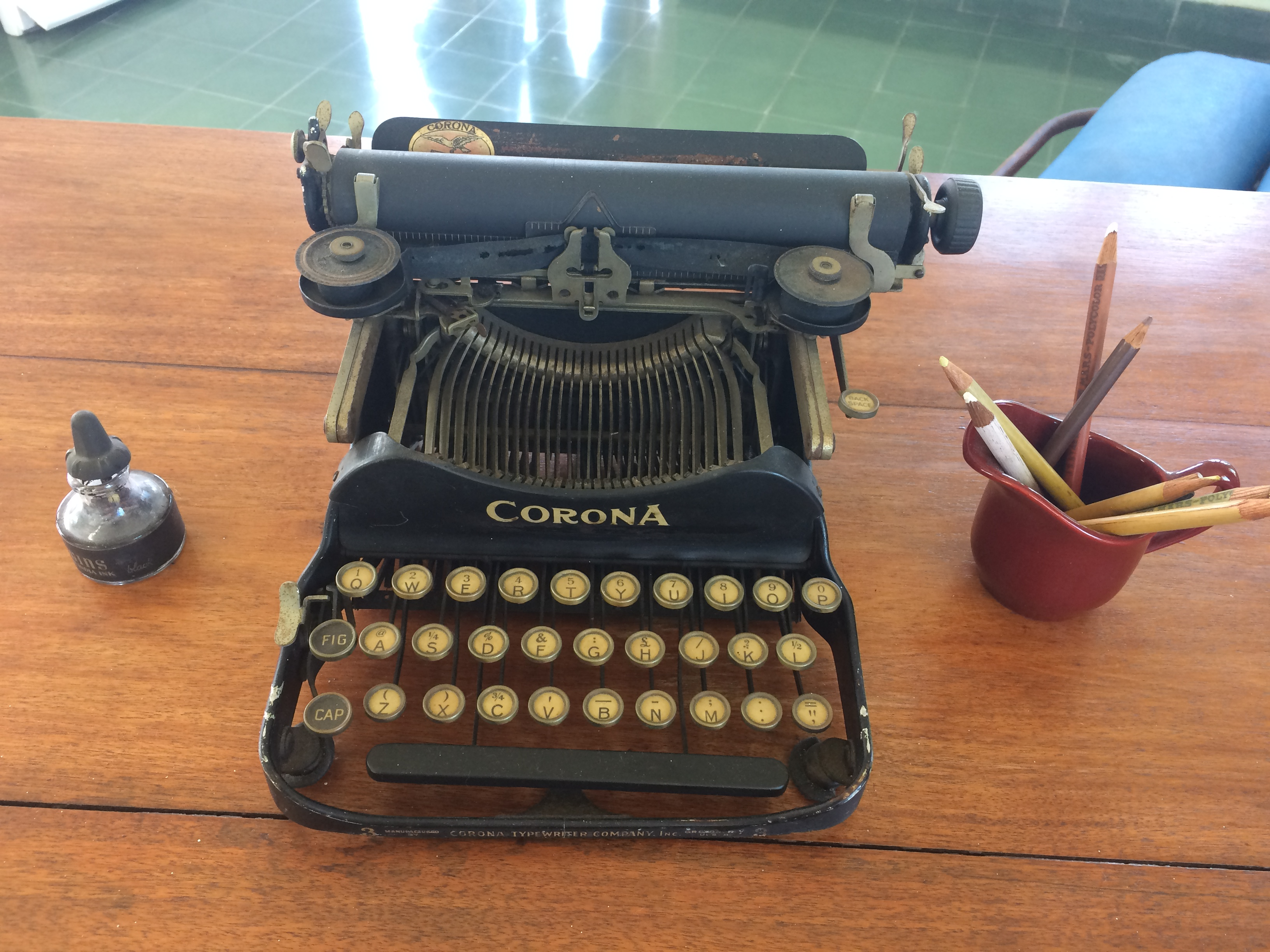
Corona #3 typewriter. Note the oddly positioned backspace key, located off the keyboard, towards the back of the machine, on the right.

Backspace is distinct from the delete key, which in a teletypewriter would punch out all the holes in punched paper tape to strike out a character, and in modern computers deletes text at or following the cursor position. Also, the delete key often works as a generic command to remove an object (such as an image inside a document, or a file in a file manager), while backspace usually does not. Full-size Mac keyboards in the USA have two keys labeled delete; a key that functions as a backspace key and a key that functions as a delete key, while in the UK, the backspace key has a left-pointing arrow on it instead. Smaller Mac keyboards, such as laptop keyboards, have only a key that functions as a backspace key. Full-size PC keyboards have a backspace key (in the main section) and two delete keys (in the extended area).

== Combining characters ==
With some typewriters, (Note: Many typewriters don't advance the carriage when an accent character is typed, thus no backspace is needed where the accent is typed ahead of the letter it is to be combined with. However, even with such machines, the backspace is still used to produce certain other characters, e.g. for combining "o" with "/" to make "ø".) a typist would, for example, type a lowercase letter A with acute accent (á) by typing a lowercase letter A, backspace, and then the acute accent key. This technique (also known as overstrike) is the basis for such spacing modifiers in computer character sets such as the ASCII caret (^, for the circumflex accent). Backspace composition no longer works with typical modern digital displays or typesetting systems. (Note: There is no reason why a digital display or typesetting system could not be designed to allow backspace composition, a.k.a. overstrike, if an engineer chose to do that. As most contemporary computer display and typesetting systems are raster graphics-based rather than character-based (as of 2012), they make overstrike actually quite easy to implement. However, the use of proportional-width rather than fixed-width (monospaced) fonts makes the practical implementation of overstrike more complicated, and the original physical motivation for the technique is not present in digital computer systems.) It has to some degree been replaced with the combining diacritical marks mechanism of Unicode, though such characters do not work well with many computer fonts, and precomposed characters continue to be used. (Some software like TeX or Microsoft Windows use the opposite method to apply a diacritical mark, namely typing the accent first, and then the base letter to be accented.)

== Use in computing ==
=== Common use ===
In modern systems, the backspace key is often mapped to the delete character (127_{10}, 7f_{16}, DEL in ASCII), although the backspace key's function of deleting the character before the cursor remains. In computers, backspace can also delete a preceding newline character, something generally inapplicable to typewriters.

IBM PC keyboard (Windows, ANSI US layout)
Esc

F1
F2
F3
F4

F5
F6
F7
F8

F9
F10
F11
F12

PrtSc/
SysRq
Scroll
Lock
Pause/
Break

Insert
Home
Page
Up

Num
Lock
∕
∗
−
Delete
End
Page
Down
7
8
9
+

4
5
6

↑

1
2
3
Enter
←
↓
→
0
Ins
.
Del

=== ^H ===
Pressing the backspace key on a computer terminal would generate code 08_{10}, the ASCII control code BS (Backspace), which would delete the preceding character. That control code could also be accessed by pressing Control+H, as H is the eighth letter of the Latin alphabet. Terminals which did not have the backspace code mapped to the function of moving the cursor backwards and deleting the preceding character would display the symbols ^H (caret, H) when the backspace key was pressed. Even if a terminal did interpret backspace by deleting the preceding character, the system receiving the text might not. Then, the sender's screen would show a message without the supposedly deleted text, while that text, and the deletion codes, would be visible to the recipient. This sequence is still used humorously for epanorthosis by computer literates, denoting the deletion of a pretended blunder, much like a strikethrough; in this case, however, the ^H symbol is faked by typing a regular '^' followed by typing a regular 'H'. For example:

Be nice to this fool^H^H^H^Hgentleman; he's visiting from corporate HQ.

==== Related sequences ====
In some contexts, ^W is used as a shortcut to delete the previous word, such as in the Berkeley Unix terminal line discipline. This shortcut has also made it into the insert mode of the Vi text editor and its clone Vim.

Similarly, ^U deletes a line.
