= Caret notation =

Notation for control characters; consists of a caret (^) and a letter

Caret notation is a notation for control characters in ASCII. The notation assigns ^A to control-code 1, sequentially through the alphabet to ^Z assigned to control-code 26. For the control-codes outside of the range 1–26, the notation extends to the adjacent, non-alphabetic ASCII characters; for example ^@ is used for control-code 0.

Often a control character can be typed on a keyboard by holding down the Ctrl and typing the character shown after the caret. The notation is often used to describe keyboard shortcuts even though the control character is not actually used (as in "type ^X to cut the text").

The meaning or interpretation of, or response to the individual control-codes is not prescribed by the letters in caret notation.

== Description ==
The notation consists of a caret (^) followed by a single character (usually a capital letter). The character has the ASCII code equal to the control code with the bit representing 0x40 reversed. A useful mnemonic, this has the effect of rendering the control codes 1 through 26 as ^A through ^Z. Seven ASCII control characters map outside the upper-case alphabet: 0 (NUL) is ^@, 27 (ESC) is ^[, 28 (FS) is ^\, 29 (GS) is ^], 30 (RS) is ^^, 31 (US) is ^_, and 127 (DEL) is ^?.

Examples are "^M^J" for the Windows CR, LF newline pair, and describing the ANSI escape sequence to clear the screen as "^[[3J".

Only the use of characters in the range of 63–95 ("?@ABC...XYZ[\]^_") is specifically allowed in the notation, but use of lower-case alphabetic characters entered at the keyboard is nearly always allowed – they are treated as equivalent to upper-case letters. When converting to a control character, except for '?', masking with 0x1F will produce the same result and also turn lower-case into the same control character as upper-case.

There is no corresponding version of the caret notation for control-codes with more than 7 bits such as the C1 control characters from 128–159 (0x80–0x9F). Some programs that produce caret notation show these as backslash and octal ("\200" through "\237"). Also see the bar notation used by Acorn Computers, below.

== History ==
The convention dates back to at least the PDP-6 (1964) from Digital Equipment Corporation (DEC) and DEC's operating system for it. A manual for the PDP-6 describes Control+C as printing ^{↑}C, i.e., a small superscript upwards arrow before the C. In the change from 1961 ASCII to 1968 ASCII, the up arrow became a caret. The PDP-6's successor, the PDP-10, and its operating system used the same convention. Some non-DEC operating systems for PDP-10s, such as TENEX and ITS, adopted the convention as well.

The same convention was used in DEC's operating systems for its PDP-11 minicomputer, such as RT-11, RSTS, and RSX-11M.

Earlier versions of Unix did not use the caret convention to display non-printing control characters, although the stty command accepted caret notation when setting the character-erase and line-kill characters. 4BSD added a ctlecho mode in which control characters are echoed using caret notation; this has been adopted by modern Unix-like systems as echoctl.

== Use in software ==
Caret notation is used to describe control characters in output by many programs, especially on Unix. They can be seen when echoing characters as the user types them as input, and showing the contents of files in a text editor or with the more and less commands.

Many terminals and terminal emulators allow the user to enter a control character by holding down Ctrl and typing the caret notation letter. Many control characters (e.g., EOT) otherwise cannot be entered directly from a keyboard. Usually, the need to hold down ⇧ Shift is avoided (for instance, lower-case letters work identically to upper-case ones). On a US keyboard layout, ctrl+/ produces DEL and ctrl+2 produces ^@. It is also common for ctrl+space to produce ^@.

This correspondence has affected shortcuts used even in modern software. For instance, it may be tempting to make Ctrl+H mean "Help", but this is the same code as ← Backspace, so other shortcuts for Help were devised.

== Alternate notations ==
The GSTrans string processing API on the operating systems for the Acorn Atom and the BBC Micro, and on RISC OS for the Acorn Archimedes and later machines, use the vertical bar character | in place of the caret. For example, |M (pronounced "control em", the same as for the ^M notation) is the carriage return character, ASCII 13. || is the vertical bar character code 124, |? is character 127 as above and |! adds 128 to the code of the character that follows it, so |!|? is character code 128 + 127 = 255.

== See also ==
- C0 and C1 control codes, which shows the caret notation for all C0 control codes as well as DEL
- Control key
