= ANSEL =

Character set

- Alias(es): ISO-IR 231
- Standard: ANSI/NISO Z39.47 (withdrawn)
- Classification: Extended ASCII, 8-bit encoding
- Extends: US-ASCII
- Extensions: MARC Extended Latin, GEDCOM ANSEL

ANSEL, the American National Standard for Extended Latin Alphabet Coded Character Set for Bibliographic Use, was a character set used in text encoding. It provided a table of coded values for the representation of characters of the extended Latin alphabet in machine-readable form for thirty-five languages written in the Latin alphabet and for fifty-one romanized languages. ANSEL adds 63 graphic characters to ASCII, including 29 combining diacritic characters.

The initial revision of ANSEL was released in 1985, and before 1993 it was registered as Registration #231 in the ISO International Register of Coded Character Sets to be Used with Escape Sequences. The standard was reaffirmed in 2003 although it has been administratively withdrawn by ANSI effective 14 February 2013.

The requirement of hardware capable of overprinting accents made this mostly impossible from ever becoming a popular extended ASCII.

== Code page layout ==
The following table shows ANSI/NISO Z39.47-1993 (R2003). Non-ASCII characters are shown with their Unicode code point. A combining diacritic precedes the spacing character on which it should be superimposed (in Unicode the combining diacritic is after the base character).

ANSI/NISO Z39.47-1993 (R2003)
	0	1	2	3	4	5	6	7	8	9	A	B	C	D	E	F
0x	NUL	SOH	STX	ETX	EOT	ENQ	ACK	BEL	BS	HT	LF	VT	FF	CR	SO	SI
1x	DLE	DC1	DC2	DC3	DC4	NAK	SYN	ETB	CAN	EM	SUB	ESC	FS	GS	RS	US
2x	SP	!	"	#	$	%	&	'	(	)	*	+	,	-	.	/
3x	0	1	2	3	4	5	6	7	8	9	:	;	<	=	>	?
4x	@	A	B	C	D	E	F	G	H	I	J	K	L	M	N	O
5x	P	Q	R	S	T	U	V	W	X	Y	Z	[	\	]		_
6x	`	a	b	c	d	e	f	g	h	i	j	k	l	m	n	o
7x	p	q	r	s	t	u	v	w	x	y	z	{	|	}	~	DEL
8x																
9x																
Ax		Ł 0141	Ø 00D8	Đ 0110	Þ 00DE	Æ 00C6	Œ 0152	ʹ 02B9	· 00B7	♭ 266D	® 00AE	± 00B1	Ơ 01A0	Ư 01AF	ʼ 02BC	
Bx	ʻ 02BB	ł 0142	ø 00F8	đ 0111	þ 00FE	æ 00E6	œ 0153	ʺ 02BA	ı 0131	£ 00A3	ð 00F0		ơ 01A1	ư 01B0		
Cx	° 00B0	ℓ 2113	℗ 2117	© 00A9	♯ 266F	¿ 00BF	¡ 00A1									
Dx																
Ex	◌̉ 0309	◌̀ 0300	◌́ 0301	◌̂ 0302	◌̃ 0303	◌̄ 0304	◌̆ 0306	◌̇ 0307	◌̈ 0308	◌̌ 030C	◌̊ 030A	◌︠ FE20	◌︡ FE21	◌̕ 0315	◌̋ 030B	◌̐ 0310
Fx	◌̧ 0327	◌̨ 0328	◌̣ 0323	◌̤ 0324	◌̥ 0325	◌̳ 0333	◌̲ 0332	◌̦ 0326	◌̜ 031C	◌̮ 032E	◌︢ FE22	◌︣ FE23			◌̓ 0313	

== Use ==
=== GEDCOM ===
The GEDCOM specification for exchanging genealogical data refers to ANSEL (ANSI/NISO Z39.47-1985) as a valid text encoding for GEDCOM files and extends it with additional characters which are shown in the following table.

Hex	Unicode	Glyph	Description
0xBE	25A1	□	empty box
0xBF	25A0	■	black box
0xCD	0065	e	midline e
0xCE	006F	o	midline o
0xCF	00DF	ß	es zet
0xFC	0338	̸	diacritic slash through char

=== MARC21 ===
The Extended Latin character set from MARC 21 is synchronized with ANSEL but additionally supports the eszett (ß) character at C7 and the euro sign (€) at C8.
