= VSCII =

National standard character encoding for the Vietnamese alphabet

- Alias(es): x-viet-tcvn5712
- Languages: Vietnamese, English
- Created by: TCVN/TC1
- Standard: TCVN 5712:1993
- Definitions: 8 bit coded Vietnamese character set
- Classification: 8-bit SBCS; Extended ASCII (VSCII-2/-3)

VSCII (Vietnamese Standard Code for Information Interchange), also known as TCVN 5712, ISO-IR-180, .VN, ABC or simply the TCVN encodings, is a set of three former-Vietnamese national standard character encodings for using the Vietnamese language with computers, developed by the TCVN Technical Committee on Information Technology (TCVN/TC1) and first adopted in 1993 (as TCVN 5712:1993).

It should not be confused with the similarly-named unofficial VISCII encoding, which was sometimes used by overseas Vietnamese speakers. VISCII was also intended to stand for Vietnamese Standard Code for Information Interchange, but is not related to VSCII.

VSCII (TCVN) was used extensively in the north of Vietnam, while VNI was popular in the south. Unicode and the Windows-1258 code page are now used for virtually all Vietnamese computer data, but legacy files or archived messages may need conversion.

== Encodings ==
All three forms of VSCII keep the 95 printable characters of ASCII unmodified.

VSCII-3, also known as TCVN 5712-3, VN3 or simply TCVN3, includes the fewest assignments. It is an extended ASCII, because it keeps all 128 codes of ASCII unmodified. It does not reassign any of the C0 and C1 control codes. Compared to ASCII, it adds 75 characters:

- 67 lowercase characters, allowing full lowercase support.
- 7 uppercase characters, allowing uppercase support for the 29 base letters without tone marks.
- The non-breaking space.

Tone marks on uppercase vowels is accomplished in TCVN3 by switching to an all-capital font.

VSCII-2, also known as TCVN 5712-2 and VN2, is a superset of VSCII-3. It is an extended ASCII, because it keeps all 128 codes of ASCII unmodified. It does not reassign any of the C0 and C1 control codes, making it conformant with ISO 2022 as a 96-set. Compared to VSCII-3, it adds (for a total of 96 non-ASCII characters):

- 16 more uppercase characters with pre-composed tone marks (for a total of 23 non-ASCII uppercase characters)
- 5 combining diacritics for tone marks, allowing other combinations of uppercase letters and tone marks to be represented. Combining marks follow the base letter as in VNI (rather than preceding them as in ANSEL).

VSCII-1, also known as TCVN 5712-1 and VN1, is an extension of VSCII-2, and is a modified ASCII, since it replaces 12 of the 33 control characters with precomposed characters. Compared to VSCII-2, it (for a total of 140 non-ASCII characters):

- Adds 44 more pre-composed uppercase letters, bringing them to the same count as the lowercase
- Does this by replacing 12 ASCII control characters and allocating 32 graphical characters to the C1 control area, breaking ISO 2022 compatibility

Conversion from VSCII-3 to VSCII-2 or VSCII-1 and conversion from VSCII-2 to VSCII-1 are not necessary, but can result in smaller files.

Conversion from VSCII-1 to VSCII-2 or VSCII-3 and conversion from VSCII-2 to VSCII-3 require expansion of some pre-composed characters.

== Character set ==
VSCII-1
	0	1	2	3	4	5	6	7	8	9	A	B	C	D	E	F
0x	NUL	Ú 00DA	Ụ 1EE4	ETX	Ừ 1EEA	Ử 1EEC	Ữ 1EEE	BEL	BS	HT	LF	VT	FF	CR	SO	SI
1x	DLE	Ứ 1EE8	Ự 1EF0	Ỳ 1EF2	Ỷ 1EF6	Ỹ 1EF8	Ý 00DD	Ỵ 1EF4	CAN	EM	SUB	ESC	FS	GS	RS	US
2x	SP	!	"	#	$	%	&	'	(	)	*	+	,	-	.	/
3x	0	1	2	3	4	5	6	7	8	9	:	;	<	=	>	?
4x	@	A	B	C	D	E	F	G	H	I	J	K	L	M	N	O
5x	P	Q	R	S	T	U	V	W	X	Y	Z	[	\	]		_
6x	`	a	b	c	d	e	f	g	h	i	j	k	l	m	n	o
7x	p	q	r	s	t	u	v	w	x	y	z	{	|	}	~	DEL
8x	À 00C0	Ả 1EA2	Ã 00C3	Á 00C1	Ạ 1EA0	Ặ 1EB6	Ậ 1EAC	È 00C8	Ẻ 1EBA	Ẽ 1EBC	É 00C9	Ẹ 1EB8	Ệ 1EC6	Ì 00CC	Ỉ 1EC8	Ĩ 0128
9x	Í 00CD	Ị 1ECA	Ò 00D2	Ỏ 1ECE	Õ 00D5	Ó 00D3	Ọ 1ECC	Ộ 1ED8	Ờ 1EDC	Ở 1EDE	Ỡ 1EE0	Ớ 1EDA	Ợ 1EE2	Ù 00D9	Ủ 1EE6	Ũ 0168
Ax	NBSP	Ă 0102	Â 00C2	Ê 00CA	Ô 00D4	Ơ 01A0	Ư 01AF	Đ 0110	ă 0103	â 00E2	ê 00EA	ô 00F4	ơ 01A1	ư 01B0	đ 0111	Ằ 1EB0
Bx	◌̀ 0300	◌̉ 0309	◌̃ 0303	◌́ 0301	◌̣ 0323	à 00E0	ả 1EA3	ã 00E3	á 00E1	ạ 1EA1	Ẳ 1EB2	ằ 1EB1	ẳ 1EB3	ẵ 1EB5	ắ 1EAF	Ẵ 1EB4
Cx	Ắ 1EAE	Ầ 1EA6	Ẩ 1EA8	Ẫ 1EAA	Ấ 1EA4	Ề 1EC0	ặ 1EB7	ầ 1EA7	ẩ 1EA9	ẫ 1EAB	ấ 1EA5	ậ 1EAD	è 00E8	Ể 1EC2	ẻ 1EBB	ẽ 1EBD
Dx	é 00E9	ẹ 1EB9	ề 1EC1	ể 1EC3	ễ 1EC5	ế 1EBF	ệ 1EC7	ì 00EC	ỉ 1EC9	Ễ 1EC4	Ế 1EBE	Ồ 1ED2	ĩ 0129	í 00ED	ị 1ECB	ò 00F2
Ex	Ổ 1ED4	ỏ 1ECF	õ 00F5	ó 00F3	ọ 1ECD	ồ 1ED3	ổ 1ED5	ỗ 1ED7	ố 1ED1	ộ 1ED9	ờ 1EDD	ở 1EDF	ỡ 1EE1	ớ 1EDB	ợ 1EE3	ù 00F9
Fx	Ỗ 1ED6	ủ 1EE7	ũ 0169	ú 00FA	ụ 1EE5	ừ 1EEB	ử 1EED	ữ 1EEF	ứ 1EE9	ự 1EF1	ỳ 1EF3	ỷ 1EF7	ỹ 1EF9	ý	ỵ 1EF5	Ố 1ED0

VSCII-3
Additions for VSCII-2
Additions for VSCII-1
