= Ogham (Unicode block) =

- Range: U+1680..U+169F (32 code points)
- Plane: BMP
- Scripts: Ogham
- Major alphabets: Irish Ogham
- Assigned: 29 code points
- Unused: 3 reserved code points

Unicode version history
- 3.0 (1999): 29 (+29)

Unicode documentation
- Code chart ∣ Web page

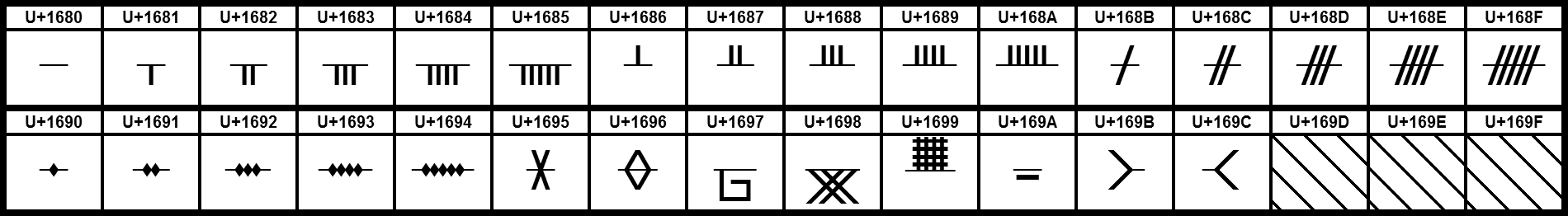
Graphical representation of the Ogham Unicode block

Ogham is a Unicode block containing characters for representing Primitive Irish language inscriptions as codified in the Ogham script.

Ogham^{[1]}^{[2]} Official Unicode Consortium code chart (PDF)
	0	1	2	3	4	5	6	7	8	9	A	B	C	D	E	F
U+168x		ᚁ	ᚂ	ᚃ	ᚄ	ᚅ	ᚆ	ᚇ	ᚈ	ᚉ	ᚊ	ᚋ	ᚌ	ᚍ	ᚎ	ᚏ
U+169x	ᚐ	ᚑ	ᚒ	ᚓ	ᚔ	ᚕ	ᚖ	ᚗ	ᚘ	ᚙ	ᚚ	᚛	᚜			
Notes: 1. As of Unicode version 16.0; 2. Grey areas indicate non-assigned code points

== History ==
The following Unicode-related documents record the purpose and process of defining specific characters in the Ogham block:

Version	Final code points (Note: Proposed code points and characters names may differ from final code points and names)	Count	L2 ID	WG2 ID	Document
3.0	U+1680..169C	29		N1103R	Everson, Michael (16 November 1994), Proposal for encoding the Ogham script in ISO 10646
3.0	U+1680..169C	29		N1203	Umamaheswaran, V. S.; Ksar, Mike (3 May 1995), "6.1.5.1", Unconfirmed minutes of SC2/WG2 Meeting 27, Geneva
3.0	U+1680..169C	29	X3L2/96-101	N1443	Everson, Michael; Jarnefors, Olle (4 August 1996), Allocating Ogham and Runes to the BMP: a strategy for making the BMP maximally useful
3.0	U+1680..169C	29	X3L2/96-123		Aliprand, Joan; Winkler, Arnold (18 December 1996), "3.2", Preliminary Minutes - UTC #71 & X3L2 #168 ad hoc meeting, San Diego - December 5-6, 1996
3.0	U+1680..169C	29	L2/97-049	N1543	Everson, Michael (27 March 1997), Proposed pDAM text for Ogham
3.0	U+1680..169C	29		N1577	Everson, Michael (30 May 1997), Results of National Enquiry on Ogham
3.0	U+1680..169C	29	L2/97-155	N1610	Everson, Michael (1 July 1997), Text for pDAM for Ogham
3.0	U+1680..169C	29	L2/97-288	N1603	Umamaheswaran, V. S. (24 October 1997), "8.6", Unconfirmed Meeting Minutes, WG 2 Meeting # 33, Heraklion, Crete, Greece, 20 June – 4 July 1997
3.0	U+1680..169C	29	L2/98-077	N1695	Paterson, Bruce (22 February 1998), Proposed Disposition of Comments on SC2 letter ballot on FPDAMs 16, 19, & 20 (Braille patterns, Runic, Ogham)
3.0	U+1680..169C	29	L2/98-134	N1772	Paterson, Bruce (6 April 1998), Revised Text of ISO 10646 Amendment 20 - Ogham
3.0	U+1680..169C	29		N1764	Paterson, Bruce (6 April 1998), Disposition of Comments Report on SC 2 N2971: Amendment 20 - Ogham
3.0	U+1680..169C	29	L2/98-286	N1703	Umamaheswaran, V. S.; Ksar, Mike (2 July 1998), "6.2.3 FPDAM-19 on Runic and FPDAM-20 on Ogham", Unconfirmed Meeting Minutes, WG 2 Meeting #34, Redmond, WA, USA; 1998-03-16--20
3.0	U+1680..169C	29	L2/07-340		Davis, Mark (6 October 2007), OGHAM SPACE MARK shouldn't be whitespace
3.0	U+1680..169C	29	L2/07-392		Everson, Michael (17 October 2007), Irish comments on L2/07-340 "OGHAM SPACE MARK shouldn't be whitespace"
3.0	U+1680..169C	29	L2/07-345		Moore, Lisa (25 October 2007), "Ogham Space Mark", UTC #113 Minutes
3.0	U+1680..169C	29	L2/08-142	N3407	Representation of Ogham Space, Tamil named sequences, 9 April 2008
3.0	U+1680..169C	29	L2/08-318	N3453 (pdf, doc)	Umamaheswaran, V. S. (13 August 2008), "M52.1", Unconfirmed minutes of WG 2 meeting 52, "Insert a dashed box around the current dash-looking glyph for 1680 OGHAM SPACE MARK, based on document N3407"

== See also ==
- Mac OS Ogham
