= NCIP =

The abbreviation NCIP may refer to:

- NISO Circulation Interchange Protocol
- National Commission on Indigenous Peoples of the Philippines
- Northern California Innocence Project
- Novel coronavirus-infected pneumonia
