= Subfield =

Subfield may refer to:

- an area of research and study within an academic discipline
- Field extension, used in field theory (mathematics)
- a Division (heraldry)
- a division in MARC standards
