= JIS X 0212 =

Japanese standard character set

- Language: Intended to be used alongside JIS X 0208 for Japanese support. Does not substantially support any language on its own.
- Standard: JIS X 0212:1990
- Current status: Unihan source. Coded character set itself not as widely supported as JIS X 0208, but sometimes used in EUC-JP.
- Classification: Supplementary charset; ISO 2022; DBCS; CJK encoding
- Extensions: IBM code page 953; OSF extensions; JIS X 0212/0213 hybrid plane 2
- Encoding formats: EUC-JP; ISO-2022-JP-1
- Succeeded by: JIS X 0213
- Other related encoding: Intended to supplement: JIS X 0208 Other supplementary ISO 2022 CJK DBCSes: KS X 1002

JIS X 0212 is a Japanese Industrial Standard defining a coded character set for encoding supplementary characters for use in Japanese. This standard is intended to supplement JIS X 0208 (Code page 952). It is numbered 953 or 5049 as an IBM code page (see below).

It is one of the source standards for Unicode's CJK Unified Ideographs.

== History ==
In 1990 the Japanese Standards Association (JSA) released a supplementary character set standard: JIS X 0212-1990 Code of the Supplementary Japanese Graphic Character Set for Information Interchange (情報交換用漢字符号-補助漢字, Jōhō Kōkan'yō Kanji Fugō - Hojo Kanji). This standard was intended to build upon the range of characters available in the main JIS X 0208 character set, and to address shortcomings in the coverage of that set.

== Features ==
Euler diagram comparing repertoires of JIS X 0208, JIS X 0212, JIS X 0213, Windows-31J, the Microsoft standard repertoire and Unicode.

The standard specified 6,067 characters, comprising:

- 21 Greek characters with diacritics
- 26 Eastern European characters with diacritics (mostly Cyrillic)
- 198 alphabetic characters with diacritics
- 5,801 kanji

== Encodings ==
The following encodings or encapsulations are used to enable JIS X 0212 characters to be used in files, etc.

- in EUC-JP characters are represented by three bytes, the first being 0x8F, the following two in the range 0xA1 – 0xFE.
- in certain implementations of the ISO 2022-based JIS encoding—including ISO-2022-JP-EXT, ISO-2022-JP-1 and ISO-2022-JP-2—the sequence ESC $ ( D is used to indicate JIS X 0212 characters.

No encapsulation of JIS X 0212 characters in the popular Shift JIS encoding is possible, as Shift JIS does not have sufficient unallocated code space for the characters.

== Implementations ==
Encoding of JIS X 0212 in conformant EUC-JP (left) and Windows code page 20932 (right).

JIS X 0212 is called Code page 953 by IBM, which includes vendor extensions. The alternative CCSID 5049 excludes these extensions.

As JIS X 0212 characters cannot be encoded in Shift JIS, the coding system which has traditionally dominated Japanese information processing, few practical implementations of the character set have taken place. As mentioned above, it can be encoded in EUC-JP, which is commonly used in Unix/Linux systems, and it is here that most implementations have occurred:

- in the early 1990s basic "BDF" fonts were compiled for use in the Unix X Window System;
- an IME conversion file was compiled for the Wnn system;
- the kterm console window application was extended to support it;
- the Emacs and jstevie editors were extended to support it.

Many WWW browsers such as the Netscape/Mozilla/Firefox family, Opera, etc. and related applications such as Mozilla Thunderbird support the display of JIS X 0212 characters in EUC-JP encoding, however Internet Explorer has no support for JIS X 0212 characters. Modern terminal emulation packages, such as the GNOME Terminal also support JIS X 0212 characters.

Applications which support JIS X 0212 in the EUC coding include:

- the xjdic dictionary program for Unix/Linux;
- the WWWJDIC Japanese dictionary server (however as Internet Explorer does not support the JIS X 0212 extensions in EUC, this server sends bitmapped graphics for these characters when set in EUC-JP mode.)

== JIS X 0212 and Unicode ==
The kanji in JIS X 0212 were taken as one of the sources for the Han unification which led to the unified set of CJK characters in the initial ISO 10646/Unicode standard. All the 5,801 kanji were incorporated.

== The future ==
Apart from the applications mentioned above, the JIS X 0212 standard is effectively dead. 2,743 kanji from it were included in the later JIS X 0213 standard. In the longer term, its contribution will probably be seen to be the 5,801 kanji which were incorporated in Unicode.

== See also ==
- JIS X 0208
- JIS X 0213
