= ArchiveGrid =

Database of archival collections and materials

- Producer: OCLC (United States)
- History: 2006 to present

Access
- Cost: Free

Coverage
- Record depth: Index & abstract
- Format coverage: archival material descriptions

Links
- Website: researchworks.oclc.org/archivegrid/

ArchiveGrid is a collection of over five million archival material descriptions, including MARC records from WorldCat and finding aids harvested from the web. It contains archival collections held by thousands of libraries, museums, historical societies, and archives. Contribution to the system is available to any institution. Most of the contributions are from United States based institutions, but many other countries are represented, including Canada, Australia, and the United Kingdom. ArchiveGrid is associated with OCLC Research and helps to advance their goals of making archival collections and materials easier to find. ArchiveGrid is described as "the ultimate destination for searching through family histories, political papers, and historical records held in archives around the world."

== History ==
Research Libraries Group (RLG) was founded in 1974 by three universities (Columbia, Harvard, and Yale) and The New York Public Library. In 1998, RLG launched the RLG Archival Resources database, which offered online access to the holdings of archival collections. RLG began to redesign the database in 2004 in order to make it more useful for researchers. As a result of this redesign, RLG launched ArchiveGrid in March 2006. As a result of a grant, ArchiveGrid was freely accessible until May 31, 2006.

== RLG/OCLC Partnership ==
In 2006, the RLG and the Online Computer Learning Center, Inc. (OCLC) announced the combining of the two organizations. RLG Programs was formed on July 1, 2006 and became part of the OCLC Programs and Research division. ArchiveGrid was offered as an OCLC subscription-based discovery service from 2006 until it was discontinued in 2012. In 2009, RLG Programs became known as RLG Partnership. The OCLC Research Library Partnership replaced the RLG Partnership in 2011. The five-year period of successfully integrating the RLG Partnership into OCLC was completed 30 June 2011. In 2012, ArchiveGrid became a free system, while remaining a part of the OCLC Research project.

== Content and Use ==
ArchiveGrid provides access to material descriptions, finding aids, and contact information of many archival institutions from many countries. The materials on ArchiveGrid are described as "historical documents, personal papers, family histories, and more," which users can access through a search or the map feature. On the website, the content is accessible through a clickable map, where users can search in specific areas by clicking on the map or by entering a location. The collections are searchable, initially alphabetically, and can also be seen all together as a list or summary. Users can save and download item descriptions, or search through the recently added section on the homepage. ArchiveGrid considers its main users to be researchers, specifically faculty, students, and genealogists, and improves the site based on the needs of that group; however, there is an increase in people who want to search through archival materials for hobbies, jobs (such as writers and filmmakers), and other personal interests.

Collections are included directly from archives, and also MARC records from WorldCat which the ArchiveGrid team identifies as archival. Archives who want to be included can submit a form so that the records can be harvested. Content is re-harvested and re-indexed about every six weeks so finding aids are updated. Use statistics are available on the ArchiveGrid website, as well as statistics regarding contributors, through Google Analytics. ArchiveGrid includes collections from:

- United States
- Canada
- Australia
- Belgium
- Brazil
- Chile
- China
- Colombia
- Denmark
- Egypt
- France
- Germany
- Greece
- Guam
- Hong Kong
- Ireland
- Israel
- Italy
- Jamaica
- Japan
- Mexico
- Netherlands
- New Zealand
- Peru
- Poland
- Russia
- Singapore
- Slovenia
- South Africa
- Spain
- Sweden
- Switzerland
- Taiwan
- Trinidad and Tobago
- Turkey
- United Kingdom
- Vatican City
- Venezuela

== See also ==
- List of academic databases and search engines
