= ISO-IR-169 =

Character encoding for Blissymbolic text

ISO-IR-169 is a character set developed by the Blissymbolics Communication International Institute (BCI), and registered with the ISO-IR registry for use with ISO/IEC 2022 by the Standards Council of Canada. It contains 2304 characters for communicating with Blissymbols, including 2267 Blissymbolic dictionary words taken from Wood, Star and Reich's 1991 Blissymbol Reference Guide.

== Code charts ==
=== Character set 0x21 (row 1) ===
Row 1 contains a space, an "error sign", punctuation and ordinal numbers. This is the only row for which Unicode mappings currently exist, as of Unicode 13.0.

ISO-IR-169 (prefixed with 0x21)
	0	1	2	3	4	5	6	7	8	9	A	B	C	D	E	F
2x		SP		!	%	?	.	,	:							
3x	0	1	2	3	4	5	6	7	8	9						
4x																
5x																
6x																
7x																

=== Character set 0x23 (row 3) ===
Row 3 contains 19 combining indicator characters for combination with Blissymbolic symbols.

=== Character sets 0x30 and onward (rows 16 and onward) ===
Rows 16 and onward include Blissymbolic dictionary words in alphabetical order by English name. They are annotated with respect to which combining indicators may be applied to the word, and whether certain combinations with indicators are forbidden due to being redundant to another encoded word.

These characters do not exist in Unicode, as of Unicode 13.0.
