= ONIX for Books =

XML format for sharing bibliographic data

ONIX for Books (ONline Information eXchange) is an XML format for sharing bibliographic data pertaining to both traditional books and eBooks. It is the oldest of the three ONIX standards, and is widely implemented in the book trade in North America, Europe and the Asia–Pacific region. It allows book and ebook publishers to create and manage rich metadata about their products, and to exchange it with their customers (distributors and retailers).

== Overview ==
The ONIX for Books standard provides a free-to-use format for passing descriptive metadata about books between publishers, data aggregators, book retailers and other interested parties in the publishing industry. Metadata concerning one or more book titles can be stored in a suitably formatted XML file known as an 'ONIX message'. Whereas other data standards exist for storing the contents of a book – the text, layout and graphics – the ONIX for Books standard holds information about the book.

== Versions ==
ONIX for Books Release 1.0 was published in 2000. Revisions were made in releases 1.1, 1.2 and 1.2.1.

Release 2.0 was issued in 2001. A backward-compatible version, Release 2.1, arrived in June 2003. Three minor revisions intended for general use have been made since then, the most recent in January 2006. A further revision intended solely for use in Japan was issued in 2010.

Release 3.0 was published in April 2009 with some corrections in 2010, and the first minor revision (labelled 3.0.1) was issued in January 2012. A second minor revision (3.0.2) was published in January 2014 and a third in April 2016. The latest version is 3.0.7, released in October 2019, and the standard continues to evolve to meet new business requirements as they emerge. This 3.0 release has not yet completely replaced 2.1, though implementation of 3.0 is widespread and continuing to grow. There is also an Acknowledgement message format (published in 2015) that recipients of ONIX data files may send to confirm receipt of ONIX messages.

The authors have stated that any new revisions will be based on, and backward-compatible with, Release 3.0. The international steering committee announced in January 2012 that support for version 2.1 would be reduced at the end of December 2014.

Releases 2.1 and 3.0 share a set of 'Codelists', or controlled vocabularies, that are extended regularly to allow new types of information to be carried out without having to revise the main specifications. From Issue 37 of the controlled vocabularies, additions apply only to ONIX 3.0, and ONIX 2.1 is limited to Issue 36 or earlier.

== Usage ==
The standard is designed for use with many different types of books. The standard also provides for the inclusion of sales and pricing information, which a publisher may not wish to freely distribute outside their organization.

== See also ==
- MARC standards
- BIBFRAME
