= Standard Interchange Protocol =

The Standard Interchange Protocol is a proprietary standard for communication between library computer systems and self-service circulation terminals. Although owned and controlled by 3M, the protocol is published and is widely used by other vendors. Version 2.0 of the protocol, known as "SIP2", is a de facto standard for library self-service applications.

== History ==
SIP version 1.0 was published by 3M in 1993. The first version of the protocol supported basic check in and check out operations, but had minimal support for more advanced operations. Version 2.0 of the protocol was published in 2006 and added support for flexible, more user-friendly notifications, and for the automated processing of payments for late fees.

SIP2 was widely adopted by library automation vendors, including ODILO, Lyngsoe Systems, Nexbib, Bibliotheca, Nedap, Checkpoint, Envisionware, FE Technologies, Meescan, Redia and open source integrated library system software such as Koha and Evergreen. The standard was the basis for the NISO Circulation Interchange Protocol (NCIP) standard which is eventually intended to replace it.

== Description ==
SIP is a simple protocol in which requests to perform operations are sent over a connection, and responses are sent in return. The protocol explicitly does not define how a connection between the two devices is established; it is limited to specifying the format of the messages sent over the connection. There are no "trial" transactions; each operation will be attempted immediately and will either be permitted or not.

The protocol specifies messages to check books in and out, to manage fee payments, to request holds and renewals, and to carry out the other basic circulation operations of a library.

== Encryption and authentication ==
SIP has no built in encryption, so steps need to be taken to send the connection through some sort of encrypted tunnel. Two common methods are to use either stunnel or SSH to add a layer of encryption and/or an extra level of authentication.
