= Jerrold Orne =

American librarian (1911–2008)

Jerrold Orne (March 25, 1911 – July 13, 2008) was an American librarian, noted for his writing on library buildings, contributions to library standards, his support for cooperative collection practices, and for helping establish the library of the United Nations.

== Education and career in libraries ==
Born in St. Paul, Minnesota, Orne received a Bachelor of Arts degree in French, with a minor in Comparative Literature from the University of Minnesota in 1932. He went on to receive an M.A. in French, with a minor in Italian, again from the University of Minnesota, and a Certificate in French language and literature from the Sorbonne, both in 1935. While he was completing his PhD in Romance Linguistics at the University of Chicago, Louis Round Wilson, Dean of the Graduate Library School in Chicago, urged Orne to pursue a degree in Library Science. Orne returned to Minnesota where he earned his B.S. in Library Science at the University of Minnesota in 1940.

Orne's first library job was as a Library Assistant at the St. Paul Public Library from 1927–1936. From September 1940 to September 1941, Orne was a fellow at the Library of Congress. Following his fellowship Orne was the director of the library at Knox College until 1943. Between 1943 and 1946, Orne served in the US Navy, performing a number of library related jobs which included helping establish the library of the United Nations. During his time serving in the Navy, Orne also worked in the Office of Research and Inventions where he worked as the head of Indexing in the Research and Development Division. Following his Navy service, Orne was hired to be the director of the libraries at Washington University in St. Louis in 1946. In April of 1950, while employed by Washington University, Orne was granted a 2 month leave of absence to help establish a library school in Havana, Cuba. In 1951 Orne left Washington University to be the director of the Air University Library at Maxwell Air Force Base in Alabama. In 1957, Orne made his final career move to the University of North Carolina at Chapel Hill where he was director of the libraries until 1972. He then served as a professor of Library Sciences at the UNC School of Information and Library Science until he retired fully in 1976.

During his tenure as library director at UNC Chapel Hill, Orne became chairman of the USA Standards Committee Z39, which became the National Information Standards Organization (NISO). Orne served as chairman from 1963 to 1977. While chairman, he expanded the program and directed the work of more than 24 subcommittees.

Orne was a proponent of embracing change, specifically technological change, and he encouraged his fellow librarians not to fear change. He also realized that standards were necessary and would enable librarians to work more seamlessly, both with one another as well as with publishers. Orne was also invested in the improvement of library facilities and wrote the Library Journal annual review of library buildings for over a decade.

== Awards ==
- 1974 Joseph W. Lippincott Award
- 1972 ALA Medal of Excellence
- 1971 Award of Merit - Association for Information Science and Technology

== Selected works ==
Orne authored or collaborated on 15 books, worked as an editor of several journals, and published over 100 articles.

=== Books ===
- Ellsworth, Ralph E, Louis Kaplan, and Jerrold Orne. 1960. Buildings. New Brunswick, N.J.: Graduate School of Library Service, Rutgers, the State University.
- Orne, Jerrold. 1949. The Language of the Foreign Book Trade : Abbreviations, Terms and Phrases. Chicago: American Library Assn.
- Swift, Grace, and Jerrold Orne. 1947. Subject Headings for Technical Libraries. Washington: Office of Technical Services, Dept. of Commerce.

=== Journals edited ===
- Editor, Southeastern Librarian, 1966-1972.
- Issue Editor, Library Trends 15, no. 2 (October 1966).
- Editorial Consultant, Library Journal, 1962-1964.
- Associate Editor, American Documentation, 1953-1957.
- Editor, Washington University Library Studies, 1949-1951
- Editor, Missouri Library Association Quarterly, 1947-1951

=== Articles ===
- Orne, Jerrold. 1976. “Academic Library Buildings: A Century in Review.” College & Research Libraries 37 (4): 316–31.
- Orne, Jerrold. 1969. “The Place of the Library in the Evaluation of Graduate Work.” College & Research Libraries 30 (1): 25–31.
- Orne, Jerrold. 1964. “Complex Problems.” Journal of Education for Librarianship 5 (2): 90–91.
- Orne, Jerrold. 1963. “Resources of Foreign Scientific Literature: Acquisition on a National Scale.” American Documentation 14 (3): 229–33.
- Orne, Jerrold. 1961. “Editorial Practice in Libraries . B. C. Brookes.” The Library Quarterly (Chicago) 31 (3): 284–85.
- Orne, Jerrold. 1960. “Storage and Deposit Libraries.” College & Research Libraries 21 (6): 446–52.
- Orne, Jerrold. 1957. “The Air University Library Building.” College & Research Libraries 18 (4): 275–80.
- Orne, Jerrold. 1955. “An Experiment in Integrated Library Service.” College & Research Libraries 16 (4): 353–59.
- Orne, Jerrold. 1952. “Maintenance and Reduction of a Collection.” American Documentation 3 (2): 101–5.
- Orne, Jerrold. 1941. “The Library of Congress Prepares for Emergencies.” ALA Bulletin 35 (6): 341–48.
- Orne, Jerrold. 1941. “The Sources of ‘I Promessi Sposi.’” Modern Philology 38 (4): 405–20.

== Personal life ==
Orne married Catherine L. Bowen in 1939. They had three children. Following his retirement, Orne spent half of each year in Prince Edward Island, Canada.

== See also ==
- National Information Standards Organization
