= ISO 2709 =

International standard

ISO 2709 is an ISO standard for bibliographic descriptions, titled Information and documentation—Format for information exchange.

It is maintained by the Technical Committee for Information and Documentation (TC 46).

== History ==
In the late 1960s the MARC format was developed under the direction of Henriette Avram at the Library of Congress to encode the information printed on library cards. It standardized in the early 1970s as ANSI/NISO Standard Z39.2-1971 and ISO 2709-1973. This was one of the first standards for information technology, and called Information Interchange Format. The 1981 version of the standard was titled Documentation—Format for bibliographic information interchange on magnetic tape. The latest edition of that standard is ANSI/NISO Z39.2-1994 (R2016) (ISSN 1041-5653). The ISO standard supersedes Z39.2. As of December 2008 the current standard is ISO 2709:2008.

== Basic structure ==
An ISO 2709 record has four sections:

- Record label—the first 24 characters of the record. This is the only portion of the record that is fixed in length. The record label includes the record length and the base address of the data contained in the record. It also has data elements that indicate how many characters are used for indicators and subfield identifiers. (See Variable fields, below)
- Directory—the directory provides the entry positions to the fields in the record, along with the field tags. A directory entry has four parts and cannot exceed twelve characters in length:
  - Field tag (3 characters)
  - Length of the field (4 characters)
  - Starting character position of the field (5 characters)
  - (Optional) Implementation-defined part
- Datafields (Variable fields)—a string containing all field and subfield data in the record
- Record separator—a single character (IS_{3} of ISO 646)

Note that although tags are often displayed as labels on bibliographic fields and each bibliographic field has an associated tag, the tags are stored in the directory not in the bibliographic field.

== Fields ==
There are three kinds of fields in the ISO 2709 record:

- Record identifier field—identifying the record and assigned by the organization that creates the record. The record identifier field has tag 001.
- Reserved fields—Reserved fields supply data which may be required for the processing of the record. Reserved fields always have a tag in the range 002–009 and 00A–00Z.
- Bibliographic Fields—these are in the range 010–999 and 0AA–ZZZ. The bibliographic fields contain data and a field separator (IS_{2} of ISO 646). They can also have these optional sub-parts:
  - Indicator (0–9 characters, as coded in the Leader)—Indicators generally provide further information about the contents of the field, the relationship between the field and other fields in the record, or about action required in certain data manipulation processes (including display labels).
  - Identifier (0–9 characters)—This identifies data within the bibliographic field. Where used, identifiers are composed of a delimiter (1 char, IS_{1} of ISO 646) and an identifying code (1–9 chars, as defined in the leader), plus a variable length string containing the data.

== Example ==
MARC21 is an instance of ISO 2709 that has the following characteristics:

- tags are in the range 002–999 only
- there is a two-character indicator on each field, and each character is a separately defined data element
- the identifier within data fields (called "subfield code" in MARC21) is a single ASCII character preceded by IS_{1} of ISO 646.

== See also ==
- MARC—a standard for coding library cataloging data using ISO 2709.
