= Henriette Avram =

American computer programmer and system analyst

- Born: Henriette Regina Davidson; October 7, 1919; New York City, United States
- Died: April 22, 2006 (aged 86); Miami, Florida
- Education: Hunter College; George Washington University
- Known for: Developing the MARC format (Machine Readable Cataloging)
- Spouse: Herbert Avram
- Children: 3
- Scientific career
- Fields: Computer science

Henriette Davidson Avram (October 7, 1919 – April 22, 2006) was a computer programmer and systems analyst who developed the MARC format (Machine Readable Cataloging), the international data standard for bibliographic and holdings information in libraries. Avram's development of the MARC format in the late 1960s and early 1970s, at the Library of Congress had a revolutionizing effect on the practice of librarianship, making possible the automation of many library functions and the sharing of bibliographic information electronically between libraries using pre-existing cataloging standards.

== Early years ==
Henriette Regina Davidson was born in Manhattan on October 7, 1919, to a father who was a watch material distributor and a mother who was a Philadelphia Ledger reporter. Although she never intended to become a librarian, Henriette did spend many Saturdays of her childhood reading in neighborhood stores, which, at that time, housed mini-public libraries.

Henriette Davidson dreamed of finding a cure for cancer, which was prevalent in her family. She therefore majored in pre-medicine at Hunter College. In 1941, she married Herbert Mois Avram, of the U.S. Navy. By the end of World War II, he was a decorated Lieutenant Commander who had been assigned to both the Atlantic and Pacific Theatres.

The Avrams had three children: Marcie, Lloyd, and Jay, and maintained residence in New York until 1951, when Herbert Avram took a job with the National Security Agency in Washington, D.C. Herbert Avram would also work for the CIA, eventually becoming a pioneer in the digital court reporting industry, which developed Closed Captions for television.

== Career beginnings ==
The couple moved first to Arlington, and later to Silver Spring. Once settled in Virginia, Avram left her life of homemaking behind. She began studying mathematics at George Washington University and joined the National Security Agency (NSA) in 1952 as one of the first computer programmers working with IBM 701.

In the early 1960s, Avram moved to the private sector working first with the American Research Bureau and later for Datatrol Corporation, a software company. Both jobs consisted of systems analysis and programming, but it was at Datatrol that Avram had her first professional experience with libraries. Asked to design a computer science library, she quickly read several library science text books in order to learn the appropriate jargon. She also hired a librarian to assist her in the design process. It was through this project that Avram was introduced to the Library of Congress Card Division Service. She also did consulting work with Frederick Kilgour, father of the Online Computer Library Center, on OCLC's first attempt at computerizing bibliographic information. In March 1965, Avram heard of an opening at the Library of Congress, and was hired as a systems analyst in the Office of the Information Systems Specialist.

== Library of Congress ==
Avram, considered a "librarian by achievement" by the American Library Association (ALA), owed much to the Library of Congress, about which she said, "... when I speak of and refer to it as 'the Great Library,' I do so with sincerity and appreciation for everything that I learned within those walls." Avram was often noted for her petite stature, New York accent, and indefatigable drive. She was also an adept leader. "She was able to foster a cooperative spirit among the computer specialists and librarians on her staff. In her typical fashion, she stepped into the world of libraries and learned libraries' problems, adopting them as her own."

Avram was hired in 1965 by the Library of Congress (LOC) to analyze cataloging data for computer processing. In keeping with her training at NSA, where she learned "the prime necessity of thoroughly understanding the subject before tackling the computer solution," Avram, along with two librarians, began this process by examining the information contained in a catalog record.

A separate mathematical algorithm would be needed for each piece of information, and there were millions of items in the catalog, in hundreds of different languages. She also studied ALA rules and LC filing rules to learn all that she could about bibliographic control. When Avram had thoroughly examined every aspect of the bibliographic record, "she translated what she learned into a set of fields ... bearing a name (the tags), handling instructions (the indicators), and parts (the subfields)."

Avram's title at LC changed to Assistant Coordinator of Information Systems in 1967. In this position, she continued to direct the MARC Pilot Project, which concluded in June 1968; she directed the MARC Distribution Service, which began in March 1969; and she began the RECON Pilot Project, which was never completed. The RECON Project was a plan to convert retrospective materials to MARC format. Because this project was not embraced by LC, retrospective conversion has taken place across the country, rather than as a nationwide coordinated effort. Avram said, "This failure has severely impacted all libraries." She also called lack of support for RECON the "single most disappointing experience" of her career.

Avram became a part of the development of the International Standard for Bibliographic Description for Monograph Publications (ISBD(M)) when she attended an International Meeting of Cataloguing Experts sponsored by the International Federation of Library Association (IFLA) in 1969. A year later, Avram became Chief of MARC Development Office at LC. She continued to head the MARC and RECON projects, but was also responsible for all of the automation involved with LC's processing activities. Her duties further expanded when she became the Director of the Network Development Office in 1976. She was then in charge of coordinating library networking and bibliographic resources and standards at both the national and international levels. In addition, she became chair of the LC Network Advisory Committee, a position which she held for over a decade. At this time she was also chair of the IFLA Working Group on Content Designators, which used the ISBD to develop the international version of MARC format known as UNIMARC.

By 1980 Avram was directing a staff of seven hundred in the Processing Department of LC. In her position as the first Director for Processing Systems, Networks and Automation Planning, she was responsible for networking, automation activities, and bibliographic products and services. When Avram became the Assistant Librarian for Processing Services three years later, her staff doubled. She was now in charge of cataloging, acquisitions, overseas operations, and development of networking and automation planning. This position lasted for six years. In speaking of her decision to remain with LC, despite other, more lucrative opportunities, Avram said, "I stayed because I loved the place, the people, and the challenge." When she retired from LC in 1992, Avram was the Associate Librarian for Collections Services. Her staff of seventeen hundred was responsible for acquisitions, cataloging, preservation, collection development, overseas operations, network and automation planning, and processing and servicing special format materials.

== MARC ==
MARC, MAchine-Readable Cataloging, is the method by which paper-and-ink card catalogs were converted to computer catalogs. This automated library systems, in turn greatly enhancing the feasibility of interlibrary lending and paving the way for networking capabilities. Avram was a key figure in the revolution of librarianship into information science.

MARC, in her words, is "an assemblage of formats, publications, procedures, people, standards, systems, equipment, etc., that has evolved over the years stimulating the development of library automation and information networks ... nationally and internationally." MARC has had many incarnations through the years, from the initial Planning Memorandum Number Three, which resulted from that first catalog card analysis at LC, to MARC 1 (as the format was subsequently named after the MARC Pilot System, November 1966-October 1967), and eventually to MARC 21, the format that is used today. Avram is the author of the book, MARC, its history and implications, published by the Library of Congress in 1975.

In order to ensure that MARC would be adopted nationwide, she worked with the American Library Association and the American National Standards Institute to make it a national standard. Not content with earning the national standard in 1971, Avram continued lobbying until MARC became an International Organization for Standardization standard in 1973. Largely due to her efforts, MARC is now used as the basis for library automation and bibliographic communication throughout the world. Avram was also one of the original planners of the Linked Systems Project. In this role, she was "tireless in spreading the gospel of using international standards to link databases housed on disparate computer systems." Though she never intended to be a librarian, Avram became a "towering figure in library automation and bibliographic control."

== Retirement ==
After retirement, Avram and her husband moved to California, Maryland. The couple remained active through St. Mary's College, where Henriette often arranged for Library of Congress officials to be guest speakers.

After Herbert, her husband of sixty-four years, died in their home on January 15, 2006, Henriette relocated to Florida. She died of cancer at Miami's Baptist Hospital on April 22, just three months after the death of her husband. She was 86 years old. Avram once said,

I'd like to be remembered as a good manager, as having done something that was significant in this world, of service to others.

Her leadership and contribution to automation and bibliographic control are proof that she achieved this goal.

Though proud of her accomplishments, Avram's famous drive never quit. "We must not sit back and be satisfied, though," she said, "there is much more to do."

== Awards and honors ==
- 1971 Margaret Mann Citation in Cataloging and Classification from the American Library Association
- 1974 Federal Women's Award
- 1977 Honorary Doctorate of Science from Southern Illinois University
- 1979 Academic/Research Librarian of the Year from the Association of College and Research Libraries
- 1980 Achievement in Library and Information Technology Award from Library and Information Technology Association
- 1981 Melvil Dewey Medal from the American Library Association
- 1986 Appreciation Award from the National Central Library of Taipei, Taiwan
- 1987 Honorary Fellow of the International Federation of Library Associations and Institutions
- 1988 Joseph W. Lippincott Award
- 1989 Distinguished Executive Service Award from the Senior Executives Association Professional Development League
- 1989 National Information Standards Organization Fellow
- 1990 John Ames Humphrey/Forest Press Award
- 1990 Professional Award from the Special Libraries Association
- 1991 Honorary Doctorate of Humane Letters from Rochester Institute of Technology
- 1992 Distinguished Service Award from the Library of Congress
- 1992 Meritorious Service Award from the American National Standards Institute
- 1993 Honorary Doctorate of Science from the University of Illinois at Urbana-Champaign
- 1997 American Library Association Honorary Membership.
