= Herbert Avram =

American chess player

Herbert Avram (24 January 1913 – 15 January 2006) was an American chess player, and a Lieutenant Commander in the U.S. Navy. He was born in New York City.

During and after World War II, he worked at the National Security Agency and the Central Intelligence Agency. The sensitive nature of his intelligence work meant that he could never be alone with Soviet chess players in chess tournaments or at chess clubs. However, this rarely, if ever, posed a problem.

Avram won the Virginia State Championship three consecutive times from 1952 to 1954. He won the Maryland Open – and thus became Maryland State Champion – twice, in 1955 and 24 years later in 1979.

He was one of the very small fraternity of players to take a point from Bobby Fischer in a rated game, defeating the 14-year-old Brooklyn prodigy in a 1957 New Jersey tournament. Fischer was the reigning U.S. Junior champion having won "The Game of the Century" shortly before this game was played.

As a player, Avram was noted for his materialism and his dogged defense, although he was also quite capable of launching sparkling attacks on the king. His chess activity tended to be marked by intervals of great activity followed by periods away from the game. The demands of his intelligence work, family life or both may have played a role in this cycle.

He also worked in the court reporting (stenography) market. He founded a company in this industry, and his efforts in this field led to the application of Closed Captioning on television.

Herbert Avram died in January 2006 at age 92. His wife of 64 years, computer programmer Henriette, succumbed to cancer three months later.
