= Eureka (OPAC) =

Eureka was the user interface for general users of the Research Library Information Network (RLIN), a bibliographic resource containing records from libraries that were members of Research Libraries Group (RLG). Eureka had the capacity to search among approximately 45 million different titles. Most of the catalog was from major research libraries and museums in the United States. Despite the OPAC formulation, Eureka technically was not a public access search engine. It was generally accessible only from networks connected to research institutions, such as universities.

Following the 2006 merger of RLG into OCLC, the Eureka databases were migrated to OCLC's FirstSearch in 2007.

== See also ==
- WorldCat
