= ONIX (publishing protocol) =

XML standard metadata format for book trade usage

ONIX (online Information exchange) refers to any of three XML standard metadata formats developed by EDItEUR for use primarily within the book trade. ONIX was originally a single standard for capturing and communicating bibliographic data relating to books. That standard is now referred to as ONIX for Books and has been expanded to include better support for eBooks. A second ONIX family of standard messages, ONIX for Serials has been added to capture metadata pertaining to serialised publications. There is also a third standard, ONIX for Publications Licenses (ONIX-PL), designed to handle the licenses under which libraries and other institutions use digital resources.

According to EDItEUR, one of the principal organizations behind the creation of the ONIX standards, ONIX is "an XML-based family of international standards intended to support computer-to-computer communication between parties involved in creating, distributing, licensing or otherwise making available intellectual property in published form, whether physical or digital." It is to some extent based on the indecs Content Model.

A working group consisting of VLB, the cash retailers KNV, Libri and Umbreit, and the German National Library promotes the use of the standard by publishing best practices and has developed a guide each for book standard notifications and for e-book standard notifications.

ONIX was developed in 1999, then later published to the public in January 2000 The Association of American Publishers (AAP) and EDItEUR made this protocol as issues rose in the publishing industry.
