= RedLightGreen =

Database of bibliographic descriptions on the Web created by Research Libraries Group

RedLightGreen was a database of bibliographic descriptions on the Web created by Research Libraries Group (RLG). It used a set of four million records extracted from OCLC's WorldCat database, and was designed to help novice users make selections from the vast bibliographic resources they would encounter in such a large set. RedLightGreen also allowed users to create citations for works found.

Work on RedLightGreen began in 2001 with funding from the Andrew W. Mellon Foundation. It was one of the earliest experiments with the Functional Requirements for Bibliographic Records which provides a structured view of bibliographic data. On 1 July 2006, RLG was merged with OCLC, and it was announced that the RedLightGreen service would be replaced by WorldCat, via Open WorldCat, available at WorldCat.org.
