= CJK characters =

Characters in shared East Asian written tradition

Translation of "That old man is 72 years old" in Vietnamese, Cantonese, Mandarin (in simplified and traditional characters), Japanese, and Korean (in both North and South varieties)

In internationalization, CJK characters is a collective term for graphemes used in the Chinese, Japanese, and Korean writing systems, which each include Chinese characters. It can also go by CJKV to include Chữ Nôm, the Chinese-origin logographic script formerly used for the Vietnamese language, or CJKVZ to also include Sawndip, used to write the Zhuang languages.

== Character repertoire ==
Standard Mandarin Chinese and Standard Cantonese are written almost exclusively in Chinese characters. Over 3,000 characters are required for general literacy, with up to 40,000 characters for reasonably complete coverage. Japanese uses fewer characters—general literacy in Japanese can be expected with 2,136 characters. The use of Chinese characters in Korea is increasingly rare, although idiosyncratic use of Chinese characters in proper names requires knowledge (and therefore availability) of many more characters. As of 2013, some South Korean students were still expected to learn 1,800 characters.

Other scripts used for these languages, such as bopomofo and the Latin-based pinyin for Chinese, hiragana and katakana for Japanese, and hangul for Korean, are not strictly "CJK characters", although CJK character sets almost invariably include them as necessary for full coverage of the target languages.

The sinologist Carl Leban (1971) produced an early survey of CJK encoding systems.

Until the early 20th century, Classical Chinese was the written language of government and scholarship in Vietnam. Popular literature in Vietnamese was written in the chữ Nôm script, consisting of Chinese characters with many characters created locally. Since the 1920s, the script since then used for recording literature has been the Latin-based Vietnamese alphabet.

=== Quadruplication ===
Quadruplication (Chinese: 四叠字, literally "four-fold characters") is a method of forming CJK characters via ideographic repetition. Ken Lunde describes these characters as "clusters of four or more identical elements, along with three identical elements in a row arranged horizontally or vertically". These characters were mostly used in Old Chinese writings and are no longer commonly used, except as components in some modern Han ideographs such as 惙.

==== Examples ====
Quadruplicate Character	English Meaning	Notes
𪚥	(obsolete) verbose; talkative	龍 ("dragon" in a grid of four)
䲜	the appearance of many kinds of fish	used in the chengyu 生活䲜䲜
㸚	(obsolete) sparse and clear	only found in historical dictionaries such as the Shuowen Jiezi

== Encoding ==
The number of characters required for complete coverage of all these languages' needs cannot fit in the 256-character code space of 8-bit character encodings, requiring at least a 16-bit fixed width encoding or multi-byte variable-length encodings. The 16-bit fixed width encodings, such as those from Unicode up to and including version 2.0, are now deprecated due to the requirement to encode more characters than a 16-bit encoding can accommodate—Unicode 17.0 has encoded 101,996 Han characters—and the requirement by the Chinese government that software in China support the GB 18030 character set.

Although CJK encodings have common character sets, the encodings often used to represent them have been developed separately by different East Asian governments and software companies, and are mutually incompatible. Unicode has attempted, with some controversy, to unify the character sets in a process known as Han unification.

CJK character encodings should consist minimally of Han characters plus language-specific phonetic scripts such as pinyin, bopomofo, hiragana, katakana and hangul.

CJK character encodings include:

- Big5 (the most prevalent encoding before Unicode was implemented)
- CCCII
- CNS 11643 (official standard of Republic of China)
- EUC-JP
- EUC-KR
- GB 2312 (subset and predecessor of GB 18030)
- GB 18030 (mandated standard in the People's Republic of China)
- Giga Character Set (GCS)
- ISO-2022-JP
- ISO-2022-KR
- KS X 1001
- KPS 9566
- Shift-JIS
- TRON
- Unicode

The CJK character sets take up the bulk of the assigned Unicode code space. There is much controversy among Japanese experts of Chinese characters about the desirability and technical merit of the Han unification process used to map multiple Chinese and Japanese character sets into a single set of unified characters.

All three languages can be written both left-to-right and top-to-bottom (right-to-left and top-to-bottom in ancient documents), but are usually considered left-to-right scripts when discussing encoding issues.

== Legal status ==
Libraries cooperated on encoding standards for JACKPHY characters in the early 1980s. According to Ken Lunde, the abbreviation "CJK" was a registered trademark of Research Libraries Group (which merged with OCLC in 2006). The trademark owned by OCLC between 1987 and 2009 has now expired.

== See also ==
- Chinese character description languages
- Chinese character encoding
- Chinese input methods for computers
- CJK Compatibility Ideographs
- Chinese character strokes
- CJK Unified Ideographs
- Complex Text Layout languages (CTL)
- Input method editor
- Japanese language and computers
- Korean language and computers
- List of CJK fonts
- Sinoxenic
- Variable-width encoding
- Vietnamese language and computers

== Sources ==
- DeFrancis, John. The Chinese Language: Fact and Fantasy. Honolulu: University of Hawaii Press, 1990. ISBN 0-8248-1068-6.
- Hannas, William C. Asia's Orthographic Dilemma. Honolulu: University of Hawaii Press, 1997. ISBN 0-8248-1892-X (paperback); ISBN 0-8248-1842-3 (hardcover).
- Lemberg, Werner: The CJK package for LATEX2ε—Multilingual support beyond babel. TUGboat, Volume 18 (1997), No. 3—Proceedings of the 1997 Annual Meeting.
- Leban, Carl. Automated Orthographic Systems for East Asian Languages (Chinese, Japanese, Korean), State-of-the-art Report, Prepared for the Board of Directors, Association for Asian Studies. 1971.
- Lunde, Ken. CJKV Information Processing. Sebastopol, Calif.: O'Reilly & Associates, 1998. ISBN 1-56592-224-7.
