= Ơ =

Latin letter O with horn

O with horn
- Ơ ơ
- O+, O*

Usage
- Writing system: Latin script
- Type: alphabetic
- Language of origin: Vietnamese
- Sound values: [ə]

History
- Development: O o: Ơ ơ
- Sisters: Ờờ, Ớớ, Ởở, Ỡỡ, Ợợ
- Variations: O+, O*

Other
- Writing direction: Left to Right

Ơ (lowercase ơ) is one of the 12 Vietnamese language vowels. It represents the sound [ə], the schwa.

As with most special Vietnamese letters, this letter is not well-supported by fonts and is often typed as either o+ or o*. The VIQR standard is o+.

On the Windows default Vietnamese keyboard Ơ can be found on where the ] key is on a US English keyboard layout.

Because Vietnamese is a tonal language this letter may optionally have any one of the five tonal symbols above or below it, as in phở.

- Ờ ờ
- Ớ ớ
- Ở ở
- Ỡ ỡ
- Ợ ợ

Ơ and Ư were in the past used for Thai Romanization, but are now written as oe and ue.

== Character mappings ==
Character information
Preview	Ơ		ơ		Ờ		ờ	
Unicode name	LATIN CAPITAL LETTER O WITH HORN		LATIN SMALL LETTER O WITH HORN		LATIN CAPITAL LETTER O WITH HORN AND GRAVE		LATIN SMALL LETTER O WITH HORN AND GRAVE	
Encodings	decimal	hex	dec	hex	dec	hex	dec	hex
Unicode	416	U+01A0	417	U+01A1	7900	U+1EDC	7901	U+1EDD
UTF-8	198 160	C6 A0	198 161	C6 A1	225 187 156	E1 BB 9C	225 187 157	E1 BB 9D
Numeric character reference	&#416;	&#x1A0;	&#417;	&#x1A1;	&#7900;	&#x1EDC;	&#7901;	&#x1EDD;
VISCII	180	B4	189	BD	150	96	182	B6

Character information
Preview	Ớ		ớ		Ở		ở	
Unicode name	LATIN CAPITAL LETTER O WITH HORN AND ACUTE		LATIN SMALL LETTER O WITH HORN AND ACUTE		LATIN CAPITAL LETTER O WITH HORN AND HOOK ABOVE		LATIN SMALL LETTER O WITH HORN AND HOOK ABOVE	
Encodings	decimal	hex	dec	hex	dec	hex	dec	hex
Unicode	7898	U+1EDA	7899	U+1EDB	7902	U+1EDE	7903	U+1EDF
UTF-8	225 187 154	E1 BB 9A	225 187 155	E1 BB 9B	225 187 158	E1 BB 9E	225 187 159	E1 BB 9F
Numeric character reference	&#7898;	&#x1EDA;	&#7899;	&#x1EDB;	&#7902;	&#x1EDE;	&#7903;	&#x1EDF;
VISCII	149	95	190	BE	151	97	183	B7

Character information
Preview	Ỡ		ỡ		Ợ		ợ	
Unicode name	LATIN CAPITAL LETTER O WITH HORN AND TILDE		LATIN SMALL LETTER O WITH HORN AND TILDE		LATIN CAPITAL LETTER O WITH HORN AND DOT BELOW		LATIN SMALL LETTER O WITH HORN AND DOT BELOW	
Encodings	decimal	hex	dec	hex	dec	hex	dec	hex
Unicode	7904	U+1EE0	7905	U+1EE1	7906	U+1EE2	7907	U+1EE3
UTF-8	225 187 160	E1 BB A0	225 187 161	E1 BB A1	225 187 162	E1 BB A2	225 187 163	E1 BB A3
Numeric character reference	&#7904;	&#x1EE0;	&#7905;	&#x1EE1;	&#7906;	&#x1EE2;	&#7907;	&#x1EE3;
VISCII	179	B3	222	DE	148	94	254	FE

== See also ==
- Ư
- Horn (diacritic)
- O͘
- Vietnamese alphabet
