= NISO Circulation Interchange Protocol =

NISO Circulation Interchange Protocol (NCIP) is a protocol that is limited to the exchange of messages between and among computer-based applications to enable them to perform functions necessary to lend and borrow items, to provide controlled access to electronic resources, and to facilitate cooperative management of these functions.

Released in May 2001 and approved on October 17, 2002, ANSI/NISO Z39.83-2002 or NCIP is a "NISO Draft Standard for Trial Use." This protocol defines a repertoire of messages and associated rules of syntax and semantics for use by applications: to perform the functions necessary to lend items; to provide controlled access to electronic resources; and to facilitate co-operative management of these functions. It is intended to address conditions in which the application or applications that initiate the lending of items or control of access must acquire or transmit information about the user, items, and/or access that is essential to successful conclusion of the function.

== See also ==
- Standard Interchange Protocol
