= Ư =

Latin letter U with horn

U with horn
- Ư ư
- U+, U*

Usage
- Writing system: Latin script
- Type: alphabetic
- Language of origin: Vietnamese
- Sound values: [ɯ]

History
- Development: U u: Ư ư
- Sisters: Ừừ, Ứứ, Ửử, Ữữ, Ựự
- Variations: U+, U*

Other
- Writing direction: Left to Right

Ư (lowercase ư) is one of the 12 Vietnamese language vowels. It represents the vowel [ɯ]. It also appears in the Jarai language where it makes the lengthened vowel sound, [ɯː].

As with most special Vietnamese letters, this letter is not well-supported by fonts and is often typed as either ⟨u+⟩ or ⟨u*⟩. The VIQR standard is ⟨u+⟩.

On the Windows default Vietnamese keyboard Ư can be found on where the [ key is on a US English keyboard layout.

Because Vietnamese is a tonal language this letter may optionally have any one of the five tonal symbols above or below it.

- Ừ ừ
- Ứ ứ
- Ử ử
- Ữ ữ
- Ự ự

Ơ and Ư were in the past used for Thai Romanization, Ơ being removed in the 1939 system and Ư lasting up until the 1968 system. Both are now written with digraphs, oe and ue.

== Character mappings ==
Character information
Preview	Ư		ư		Ừ		ừ	
Unicode name	LATIN CAPITAL LETTER U WITH HORN		LATIN SMALL LETTER U WITH HORN		LATIN CAPITAL LETTER U WITH HORN AND GRAVE		LATIN SMALL LETTER U WITH HORN AND GRAVE	
Encodings	decimal	hex	dec	hex	dec	hex	dec	hex
Unicode	431	U+01AF	432	U+01B0	7914	U+1EEA	7915	U+1EEB
UTF-8	198 175	C6 AF	198 176	C6 B0	225 187 170	E1 BB AA	225 187 171	E1 BB AB
Numeric character reference	&#431;	&#x1AF;	&#432;	&#x1B0;	&#7914;	&#x1EEA;	&#7915;	&#x1EEB;
VISCII	191	BF	223	DF	187	BB	215	D7

Character information
Preview	Ứ		ứ		Ử		ử	
Unicode name	LATIN CAPITAL LETTER U WITH HORN AND ACUTE		LATIN SMALL LETTER U WITH HORN AND ACUTE		LATIN CAPITAL LETTER U WITH HORN AND HOOK ABOVE		LATIN SMALL LETTER U WITH HORN AND HOOK ABOVE	
Encodings	decimal	hex	dec	hex	dec	hex	dec	hex
Unicode	7912	U+1EE8	7913	U+1EE9	7916	U+1EEC	7917	U+1EED
UTF-8	225 187 168	E1 BB A8	225 187 169	E1 BB A9	225 187 172	E1 BB AC	225 187 173	E1 BB AD
Numeric character reference	&#7912;	&#x1EE8;	&#7913;	&#x1EE9;	&#7916;	&#x1EEC;	&#7917;	&#x1EED;
VISCII	186	BA	209	D1	188	BC	216	D8

Character information
Preview	Ữ		ữ		Ự		ự	
Unicode name	LATIN CAPITAL LETTER U WITH HORN AND TILDE		LATIN SMALL LETTER U WITH HORN AND TILDE		LATIN CAPITAL LETTER U WITH HORN AND DOT BELOW		LATIN SMALL LETTER U WITH HORN AND DOT BELOW	
Encodings	decimal	hex	dec	hex	dec	hex	dec	hex
Unicode	7918	U+1EEE	7919	U+1EEF	7920	U+1EF0	7921	U+1EF1
UTF-8	225 187 174	E1 BB AE	225 187 175	E1 BB AF	225 187 176	E1 BB B0	225 187 177	E1 BB B1
Numeric character reference	&#7918;	&#x1EEE;	&#7919;	&#x1EEF;	&#7920;	&#x1EF0;	&#7921;	&#x1EF1;
VISCII	255	FF	230	E6	185	B9	241	F1

== See also ==
- Ơ
- Vietnamese alphabet
