= JACKPHY =

In library automation, the initialism JACKPHY refers to a group of language scripts not based on Roman characters, specifically: Japanese, Arabic, Chinese, Korean, Persian, Hebrew, and Yiddish. Focus on these seven writing systems by Library of Congress, based on sharing bibliographic records using MARC standards, included a partnership between 1979 and 1983 with the Research Libraries Group to develop cataloging capability for non-Roman scripts in the RLIN bibliographic utility. Ongoing efforts (JACKPHY Plus) enabled functionality for Cyrillic and then Greek in the MARC-8 character set.

== See also ==
- ALA-LC romanization
- Chinese Character Code for Information Interchange
