= National Information Standards Organization =

American non-profit organization

- Abbreviation: NISO
- Formation: June 22, 1939; 87 years ago
- Type: Non-Profit
- Purpose: National standards
- Headquarters: Baltimore, Maryland
- Members: 221 organizations
- Official language: English
- Executive Director: Todd A. Carpenter
- Budget: US$1.2 million
- Staff: 6
- Volunteers: 500
- Website: www.niso.org
- Formerly called: Z39 Committee

The National Information Standards Organization (NISO; /ˈnaɪsoʊ/) is a United States non-profit standards organization that develops, maintains and publishes technical standards related to publishing, bibliographic and library applications. It was founded in 1939 as the Z39 Committee, chaired from 1963 to 1977 by Jerrold Orne, incorporated as a not-for-profit education association in 1983, and assumed its current name in 1984.

== Organization ==
NISO offers two membership categories, "voting members" and "library standards alliance". In January 2016, the "voting members" included 77 large corporations, mostly publishers, and large library organizations such as the American Library Association. Voting members elect Directors and comment and vote on standards. The "Library Standards Alliance" included 135 members, primarily university and large public libraries. Library members receive free access to NISO webinars.

Todd Carpenter was appointed Executive Director of NISO in 2006. In February 2019, NISO announced plans to merge with the National Federation of Advanced Information Services (NFAIS) in July 2019. In 2020, NISO launched the NISO Plus conference, continuing the tradition of the NFAIS annual conference.

== Work ==
NISO is accredited by the American National Standards Institute (ANSI) and develops technical standards used in publishing, libraries, media, and other content distribution. NISO develops both formal U.S National Standards as well as recommended practices. It also hosts a variety of educational and training programs for the community. NISO is designated by ANSI to represent U.S. interests to the International Organization for Standardization's Technical Committee 46 (Information and Documentation), all of its subcommittees, as well as the ISO/IEC Joint Technical Committee 1 Subcommittee 34 - Document description and processing languages (JTC 1/SC 34). In 2008, NISO was appointed Secretariat on behalf of ANSI for the TC 46 Subcommittee 9 (TC 46/SC 9) - Identification and Description.

NISO approved standards are published by ANSI. Unlike most other ANSI standards, all of NISO standards and best practices are freely available from its web site. Designations (names) of NISO standards all start with ANSI/NISO Z39 (read zee or zed thirty nine).

In addition to formal standards, NISO also publishes recommended practices, technical reports and other consensus documents, and offers continuing education for librarians and information professionals. Information Standards Quarterly (ISQ), NISO's magazine, has been available online as open access since 2011.

== List of standards ==
Examples of NISO standards include:

- ANSI/NISO Z39.2: Bibliographic records Information Interchange Format (IIF) encoding mostly used with MARC standards
- ANSI/NISO Z39.29: Bibliographic References; last version is ANSI/NISO Z39.29-2005 (R2010)
- ANSI/NISO Z39.5: journal title abbreviations, resulting in the 1969 publication of the American National Standard for the Abbreviation of Titles of Periodicals
- ANSI/NISO Z39.7: Information Services and Use: Metrics & Statistics for Libraries and Information Providers Data Dictionary
- ANSI/NISO Z39.21: International Standard Book Number
- ANSI/NISO Z39.50: a protocol for accessing bibliographic databases
- ANSI/NISO Z39.83: NISO Circulation Interchange Protocol (NCIP) for library catalogue data exchange
- ANSI/NISO Z39.84: Digital object identifier (DOI)
- ANSI/NISO Z39.85: Dublin Core
- ANSI/NISO Z39.86: Specifications for the Digital Talking Book: DAISY Digital Accessible Information SYstem
- ANSI/NISO Z39.87: Technical Metadata for Digital Still Images - MIX
- ANSI/NISO Z39.88: OpenURL
- ANSI/NISO Z39.93: Standardized Usage Statistics Harvesting Initiative (SUSHI) Protocol
- ANSI/NISO Z39.96: JATS: Journal Article Tag Suite
- ANSI/NISO Z39.99: ResourceSync Framework Specification
- ANSI/NISO Z39.102: STS: Standards Tag Suite
- ANSI/NISO Z39.105: Content Profile/Linked Document (CP/LD)
