= Research Libraries Group =

American library consortium

The Research Libraries Group (RLG) was a U.S.-based library consortium that existed from 1974 until its merger with the OCLC library consortium in 2006. RLG developed the Eureka interlibrary search engine, the RedLightGreen database of bibliographic descriptions, and ArchiveGrid, a database containing descriptions of archival collections. It also developed a framework known as the "RLG Conspectus" for evaluating research library collections, which evolved into a set of descriptors used in library collection policy statements, last updated in 1997. The Library of Congress used the conspectus in 2015 in revising its own collection policy statement, and decided to retain this resource on its website, as a helpful scale for judging an academic collection's depth.

== History ==
RLG was founded in 1974 by four major research libraries: the New York Public Library and the university libraries of Columbia, Harvard and Yale; it was incorporated as a not-for-profit membership organization in 1975. RLG was established in part due to dissatisfaction among research institutions with the record-keeping of the OCLC library consortium.

In 1978 RLG moved its offices, which were originally in Branford, Connecticut (not far from New Haven), to Stanford University; and it adopted Stanford Library's BALLOTS computerized processing system. This system evolved into the online database RLIN (Research Libraries Information Network), which notably included bibliographic data representing JACKPHY (non-Roman) scripts. RLIN was generally used only by library specialists; in 1993 RLG developed Eureka as an interface for non-librarians.

In 1988 RLG moved its offices to Mountain View, California. In the meantime its membership had expanded to include other research libraries in the U.S., and by 1989 reached 100 members. In 1992 the British Library became the first member outside North America. As of 2003, RLG's membership included over 160 research institutions in 15 different countries.

In July 2006, RLG and OCLC officially initiated a merging of their organizations and resources. The completion of this process took place over a five-year period, through June 2011. RLG's catalog became part of OCLC's WorldCat. Its programs joined with OCLC Research to become OCLC Programs and Research. Eureka databases were migrated to OCLC's FirstSearch service. An RLG staff of reduced size was relocated from Mountain View to San Mateo, California.
