= Mac OS Ogham =

Character encoding for representing Ogham text

- Language(s): Primitive Irish
- Created by: Evertype
- Classification: Extended ASCII
- Extends: I.S. 434

Mac OS Ogham is a character encoding for representing Ogham text on Apple Macintosh computers. It is a superset of the Irish Standard I.S. 434:1999 character encoding for Ogham (which is registered as ISO-IR-208), adding some punctuation characters from Mac OS Roman. It is not an official Mac OS Codepage.

== Layout ==
Each character is shown with its equivalent Unicode code point. Only the second half of the table (code points 128–255) is shown, the first half (code points 0–127) being the same as ASCII.

Mac OS Ogham
| | 0 | 1 | 2 | 3 | 4 | 5 | 6 | 7 | 8 | 9 | A | B | C | D | E | F |
| 8x | | | | | | | | | | | | | | | | |
| 9x | | | | | | | | | | | | | | | | |
| Ax | | ° | | £ | § | · | ¶ | | ® | © | | | | | | |
| Bx | | ± | | | | | | | | | | | | | | |
| Cx | | | | | | | | | | | NBSP | | | | | |
| Dx | | | | | | | | | | | | € | | | | |
| Ex | | ᚁ | ᚂ | ᚃ | ᚄ | ᚅ | ᚆ | ᚇ | ᚈ | ᚉ | ᚊ | ᚋ | ᚌ | ᚍ | ᚎ | ᚏ |
| Fx | ᚐ | ᚑ | ᚒ | ᚓ | ᚔ | ᚕ | ᚖ | ᚗ | ᚘ | ᚙ | ᚚ | ᚛ | ᚜ | | | |
Differences from I.S. 434
