= Standard =

Standard may refer to:

== Symbols ==
- Colours, standards and guidons, kinds of military signs
- Standard (emblem), a type of a large symbol or emblem used for identification

== Norms, conventions or requirements ==
- Standard (metrology), an object that bears a defined relationship to a unit of measure used for calibration of measuring devices
- Standard (timber unit), an obsolete measure of timber used in trade
- Breed standard (also called bench standard), in animal fancy and animal husbandry
- BioCompute Standard, a standard for next generation sequencing
- De facto standard, product or system with market dominance
- Gold standard, a monetary system based on gold; also used metaphorically for the best of several options, against which the others are measured
- Internet Standard, a specification ratified as an open standard by the Internet Engineering Task Force
- Learning standards, standards applied to education content
- Standard displacement, a naval term describing the weight and status of a warship
- Standard language, a particular variety of a language accepted as the institutionalized norm in a community
- Standard solution, in chemistry, a solution of known concentration
- Standard of care, the degree of prudence and caution required of an individual who is under a duty of care
- Technical standard, an established norm or requirement about technical systems
  - International standard, standards suitable for worldwide use
  - Open standard, a standard that is publicly available
  - Standard operating procedure, a step-by-step instruction to achieve a desired result
  - Standardization, the process of establishing technical standards
  - Standards organization, an entity primarily concerned with maintaining standards
- Standard-gauge railway (SGR)

=== Mathematics ===
- Standard algorithms, long-taught methods of computation such as long division
- Standard deviation, a statistical measure of variation
  - Standard score, a statistics term
- Standard part function, used to define the derivative of a function
- Standard Young tableaux, a type of combinatorial object
- Standardized rate, a statistical measure of any rates in a population

=== Military ===
- Standard-type battleships produced by the U.S. Navy
- Standard Missile
- Standard operating procedure, an established method of accomplishing a task
- United States Military Standard, a specification used to help achieve standardization objectives by the U.S. Department of Defense

== Places ==
=== United States ===
- Standard, Illinois, Putnam County, a village
- Standard, Washington, Whatcom County, a ghost town
- Standard City, Macoupin County, a village

== Arts, entertainment, and media ==
=== Music ===
==== Groups ====
- The Standard (band), an American indie rock band
- The Standard, a rap trio formed by Nas, Common and Q-Tip

==== Musical terms and concepts ====
- Standard (music), the most popular and enduring songs from a particular genre or style
  - Adult standards, a radio format that includes pop standards
  - Jazz standards, musical compositions which are an important part of the musical repertoire of jazz musicians, in that they are widely known, performed, and recorded by jazz musicians, and widely known by listeners
  - List of blues standards, blues songs that have attained a high level of recognition
  - Pop standards, particularly the songs comprising the Great American Songbook

==== Albums ====
- Standard (Scandal album), the fifth studio album by Japanese pop rock band, Scandal
- Standard (Witness album), a gospel music album by Witness
- Standards (Sonny Clark album), 1998
- Standards (Lloyd Cole album), a 2013 rock album by Lloyd Cole released
- Standards (Grant Green album), a 1998 album by jazz guitarist Grant Green first released in Japan in 1980 as Remembering
- Standards (Into It. Over It. album)
- Standards, Vol. 1, a 1983 album by jazz pianist Keith Jarrett
- Standards, Vol. 2, a 1985 album by jazz pianist Keith Jarrett
- Standards (Lee Morgan album), a 1998 album by jazz trumpeter Lee Morgan released on the Blue Note label
- Standards (Tortoise album), the fourth album by the American post-rock band Tortoise
- Standards (Ken Vandermark album), 1995
- Standards (Seal album), a 2017 album by Seal
- Standards (Bernie Worrell album), solo album by former Parliament-Funkadelic keyboardist Bernie Worrell
- Standards, music album by Blaggards
- The Standard (Tommy Flanagan album), a 1980 album by The Super Jazz Trio
- The Standard (Take 6 album), a 2008 album by Take 6
- The Standards, a 2013 studio album by Gloria Estefan

==== Songs ====
- "Standard" (The View song), a song by the View
- "Standards", a song by the Jam from the album This Is the Modern World

=== Periodicals ===
- Standard (magazine), a defunct Serbian magazine
- Der Standard, an Austrian newspaper
- Dunoon Observer and Argyllshire Standard, a Scottish newspaper
- London Evening Standard, a London newspaper often referred to as "The Standard"
- Mornington Standard, newspaper of Frankston, Victoria

- Standard (Frankston), a later name

- The Port Melbourne Standard newspaper of Port Melbourne, Victoria

- The Standard (Port Melbourne) an earlier name

- Standard (Thailand), a defunct weekly newspaper published in Thailand
- St. Catharines Standard, a St. Catharines, Ontario, newspaper
- Toronto Standard online newspaper, also an historical (1848–1849) paper
- The Standard (Hong Kong), a business newspaper in Hong Kong
- The Standard (Kenya), a Kenyan newspaper
- The Standard (Zimbabwe), a weekly newspaper in Zimbabwe
- The Weekly Standard, an American neoconservative magazine, sometimes abbreviated as The Standard

=== Television shows ===
- The Standard (TV series), a television series

=== Radio stations ===
- MBC Standard FM, a South Korean radio station

== Sports ==
- FK Standard Sumgayit, a former Azeri association football team
- Standard Liège, a Belgian association football team that is often abbreviated as Standard

== Vehicles ==
=== Automotive ===
- Standard (1904 automobile) (1904–1906), an American automobile
- Standard (1911 automobile) (1911–1912), a German automobile
- Standard (1912 automobile) (1912–1923), an American automobile manufactured in Butler, Pennsylvania
- Standard (Indian automobile) (1957–1987), mostly based on the British Standard cars
- Standard (Italian automobile) (1906–1908), an Italian automobile manufactured by the Fabbrica Automobili Standard of Torino
- Standard Electric (automobile) (1911-1915) an American electric automobile manufactured in Jackson, Michigan
- Standard Motor Company (1903–1963), an English car and aircraft manufacturer
- Standard Motor Products, a manufacturer and distributor of aftermarket automotive parts
- Standard Six (1909–1910), an American automobile manufactured in St Louis, Missouri
- Standard Steam Car (1920–1921), an American steam car manufactured by the Standard Engineering Company of St Louis, Missouri
- Standard Superior, and automotive manufacturer, e.g., of the Standard automobile (1933–1935, 1950–1954), produced from 1933 to 1935 by Standard Fahrzeugfabrik of Ludwigsburg, Germany
- Standard transmission, a type of transmission used in motor vehicles

=== Aviation ===
- FAI Standard Class, for glider competition
- Prue Standard, glider

== Other businesses ==
- American Standard Companies, a global provider of air conditioning systems and services, bath and kitchen products, and vehicle control systems
- Chevron Corporation, an American multinational energy corporation that is also called Standard in sixteen U.S. states
- Standard Bank, one of South Africa's largest financial operators
- Standard Fruit Company, an American company
- Standard Glass and Paint Company Building, listed on the National Register of Historic Places in Polk County, Iowa
- Standard Hotel, a hotel chain originating in Los Angeles
- Standard Insurance Company, an American insurance and financial company
- Standard Oil (1863–1911), a large integrated oil producing, transporting, refining, and marketing organization
- Standard Steel Casting Company, an American company
- Standard Talking Machine Company, an early twentieth century record label
- The Standard, Copenhagen, a restaurant complex in central Copenhagen, Denmark
- The Standard, East Village, a hotel in New York City
- The Standard, High Line, a hotel in New York City

== Computing and technology ==
- Standards (software)
- Standard cell, a voltage reference, or a building block for electronic integrated circuits

== Plants and plant husbandry ==
- Standard (tree), a type of fruit tree form
- Coppice with standards, the retention of some mature trees in a wood mainly of trees which are coppiced

== Other uses ==
- Standard (typeface)
- Standard (warez), rules for unauthorized public release of copyrighted material
- Standard (mail collar), also called a pizaine, a chain mail collar often worn with plate armor

== See also ==
- Canon (disambiguation)
- Industry standard (disambiguation)
- National standards (disambiguation)
- Standardbred, an American horse breed best known for its ability in harness racing
- Standart (disambiguation)
- STD (disambiguation)
- The Standard (disambiguation)
- Usual (disambiguation)
