= Trevor Ncube =

Zimbabwean entrepreneur & newspaper publisher (born 1962)

Trevor Vusumuzi Ncube
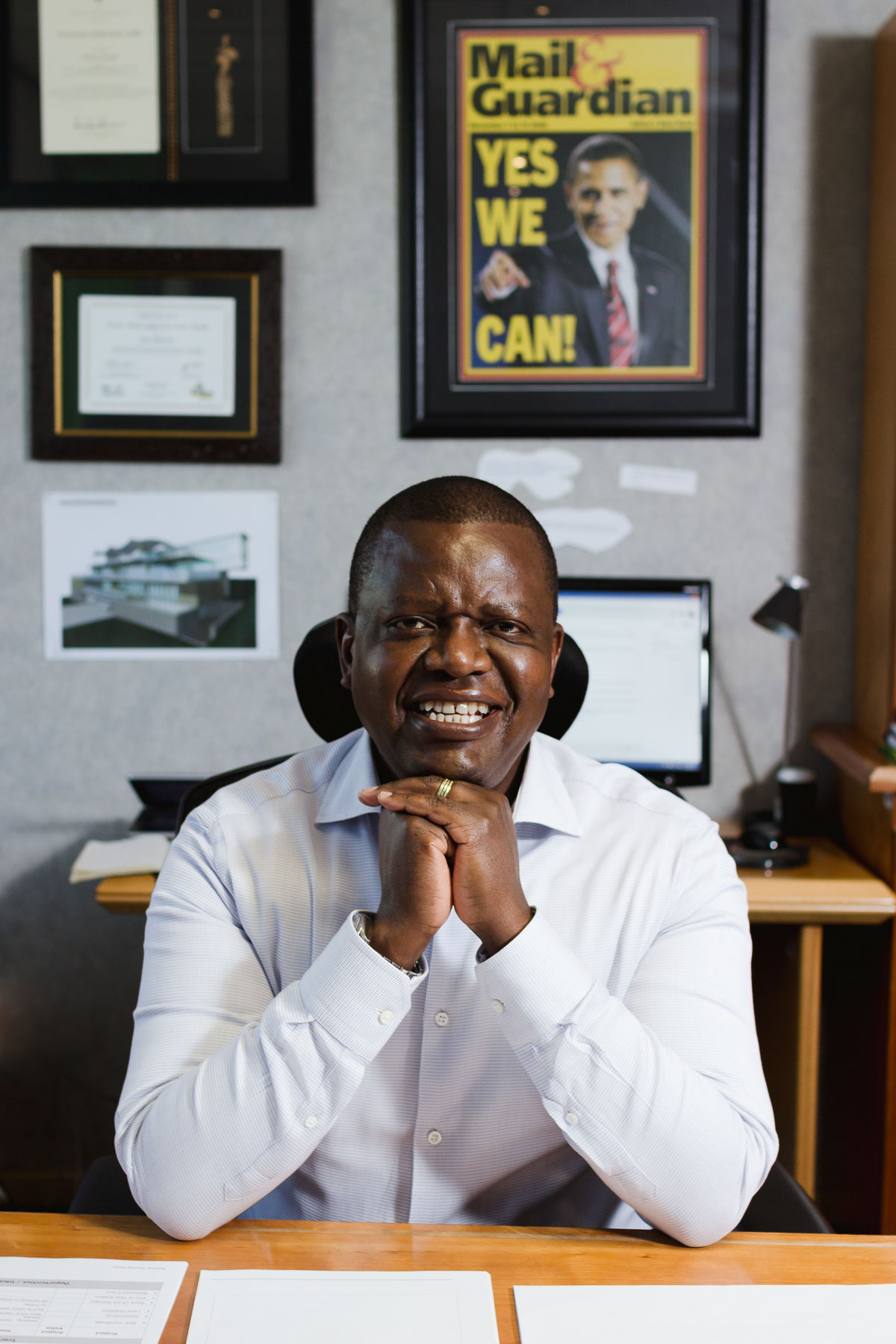
- Trevor Ncube in 2017
- Born: September 9, 1962 (age 64)
- Citizenship: Zimbabwe
- Education: Bachelor of Arts (Honours) degree in Economic History from the University of Zimbabwe
- Occupation: Entrepreneur

Trevor Vusumuzi Ncube is a Zimbabwean entrepreneur and newspaper publisher now living in South Africa and publishing in both countries. As an editor and publisher, he was a critical voice in media of former Zimbabwean President Robert Mugabe and his government.

== Personal ==
Ncube was born in Bulawayo, Zimbabwe. Ncube holds a Bachelor of Arts (Honours) degree in Economic History from the University of Zimbabwe. He was a teacher at Pumula High School in the early 1980s. He then went to work as a journalist, then editor and ultimately newspaper publisher by end of the 1990s.

== Career ==
=== Journalist ===
In 1989 Trevor Ncube became assistant editor at The Financial Gazette and was named its executive editor in 1991. He resigned in 1996, after a falling-out with its owner Elias Rusike, before joining the newly launched Zimbabwe Independent as their first chief editor in May 1996.

Ncube was arrested and imprisoned by the Mugabe regime several times in the course of his work. In 2007, the German Africa Foundation described Ncube as "one of the most important journalists in Southern Africa."

=== Media owner ===
Ncube was the main shareholder of the Mail & Guardian between 2002 and December 2017, when he negotiated the sale of the major part of his holdings to Media Development Investment Fund. The deal was finalized in early 2020.

He is the founder and owner of Alpha Media Holdings (AMH), one of Zimbabwe's biggest media companies and the publisher of NewsDay (together with its regional inset The Southern Eye), Zimbabwe Independent, and The Standard.

He also served as the president of Print Media South Africa, an industry body representing newspaper and magazine publishers, for four years split over non-consecutive 2003–2005 and 2006–2008 terms.

=== Other ===
Ncube is the host, producer and owner of the popular video podcast In Conversation with Trevor. It bills itself as an in-depth, "hard-hitting" weekly interview program, featuring successful artists, businessmen, politicians, and other figures prominent in the region.

In January 2019, Ncube was appointed to the Zimbabwean President Emmerson Mnangagwa's newly established Presidential Advisory Council (PAC). His responsibilities included oversight of "media perception", which, in combination with the sale of a portion of Alpha Media Holdings to Mnangagwa's son-in-law, raised fears of improper governmental influence over Ncube's media properties. He announced his resignation from the PAC in March 2022, marking its collapse as an effective political entity.

The Mnangagwa administration denied Trevor Ncube a TV license notwithstanding that he was close to Mnangagwa, even having ED's son-in-law as a business partner.

He is known for his skepticism or some sort of animosity towards Morgan Tsvangirai, the founding MDC leader and subsequently Nelson Chamisa. He has frequently clashed with Nelson Chamisa's supporters on Twitter. Trevor Ncube has always been an eager proponent of third way, a reference to having another political player other than Zanupf or MDC/ CCC.

== Press freedom in Zimbabwe ==
On 10 December 2005, Trevor Ncube had his passport taken away by Mugabe's government, in the first application of restrictive press freedom laws. The passport was later returned after the seizure was exposed to be illegal. The government of Zimbabwe tried again, unsuccessfully, to strip him of his citizenship on the basis that his father was born in Zambia. The attempt was seen by many as an attempt to close his newspapers which are highly critical of the government of Zimbabwe's President Mugabe. Zimbabwean law does not allow foreigners to own newspapers. As a result of the political crisis, journalists fled the country, and Ncube moved to South Africa.

== SABC blacklist ==
The South African Broadcasting Corporation blacklisted critics of Mugabe and Zimbabwe's government—a list which included Trevor Ncube. The information came out of a report from a Pretoria-appointed commission of inquiry. Later, a South African court—the South Gauteng High Court—ruled that Snuki Zikalala, SABC managing director, in overseeing the news operation had acted in the interests of South African President Thabo Mbeki and manipulated news about Zimbabwe, including the silencing of critics.

== Awards ==
- 1994—Trevor Ncube was named Zimbabwean Editor of the Year.
- 2007—International Publishers Association Freedom Prize Award
- 2008—German Africa Award. The German Africa Foundation presented Ncube for his dedication for press freedom, human rights and democracy in Zimbabwe and the whole of Southern Africa.
- 2010—Kenya Nation Media Group Life Achievement Award
- 2012—MISA Press Freedom Award. The Media Institute of Southern Africa awarded Ncube its annual award "for his role in providing Zimbabweans with alternative platforms for critical, alternative views on social, economic and political issues."
- Ncube was cited as one of the Top 100 most influential Africans by New African magazine in 2014.
