= Chief compliance officer =

Corporate executive

Chief Compliance Officer
Occupation
- Names: Chief Compliance Officer
- Synonyms: CCO
- Occupation type: Corporate title
- Activity sectors: Law, finance, healthcare, technology, other regulated industries

Description
- Competencies: Law, regulatory compliance, risk management, internal controls, legal, policy development
- Fields of employment: C-suite
- Related jobs: Chief executive officer, Chief legal officer, Chief risk officer

The chief compliance officer (CCO) of a C-suite is the officer primarily responsible for overseeing and managing regulatory compliance issues within an organization. The CCO typically reports to the chief executive officer or the chief legal officer.

The role has long existed at companies that operate in heavily regulated industries such as financial services and healthcare. For other companies, the rash of 2000s accounting scandals, the Sarbanes–Oxley Act, and the recommendations of the U.S. Federal Sentencing Guidelines have led to additional CCO appointments.

Scott Cohen, editor and publisher of Compliance Week, dates the proliferation of CCOs to a 2002 speech by SEC commissioner Cynthia Glassman, in which she called on companies to designate a "corporate responsibility officer." The responsibilities of the position often include leading enterprise compliance efforts, designing and implementing internal controls, policies and procedures to assure compliance with applicable local, state and federal laws and regulations and third party guidelines; managing audits and investigations into regulatory and compliance issues; and responding to requests for information from regulatory bodies.

== Function ==
Chief compliance officers work to make sure their respective business or company complies with legal and regulatory requirements by reviewing related laws and regulations and getting updated on the current industry standard. Compliance officers differ by company and business but common ones include corporate compliance officer, and healthcare compliance officer.

In the United States, the Bank Secrecy Act (BSA) mandates that certain financial institutions designate a Compliance Officer who is responsible for implementing and maintaining an effective Anti-Money Laundering (AML) program. Additionally, the Dodd-Frank Wall Street Reform and Consumer Protection Act and the Securities and Exchange Commission (SEC) regulations require registered investment advisers to appoint a CCO or compliance teams to ensure adherence to federal securities laws.
