= Standart =

Standart may refer to:

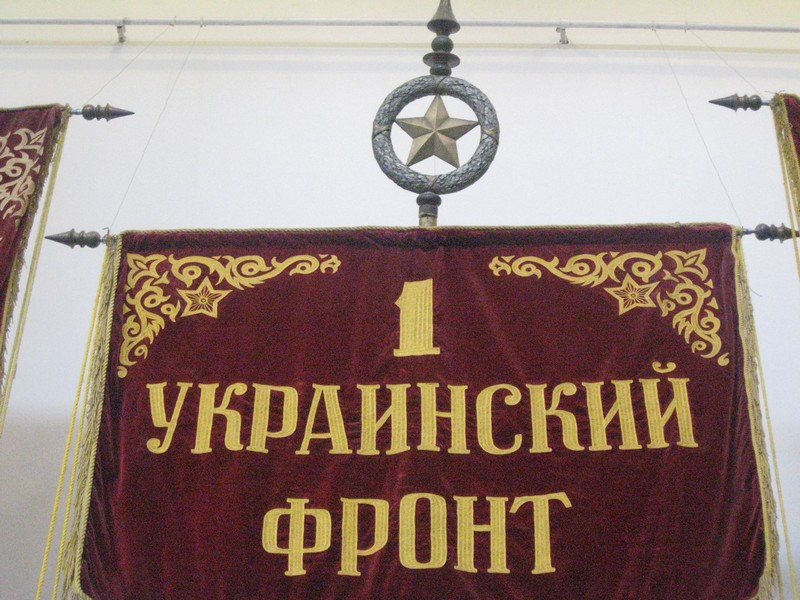
Shtandart (Regimental colors of) the 1st Ukrainian Front

== People ==
- Frank W. Standart (1871–1941), American lawyer and politician
- Joseph G. Standart (1834–1912), American hardware businessman in Detroit

== Other ==
- an alternative translation of Штандартъ, the Russian name of the ship Shtandart
- Standart (Heraldic flag), the Russian Regimental colors
- Shtandart (frigate, 1703), a Russian sailing frigate constructed in 1703–1730 and recreated in 1999
- Standart (newspaper), a Bulgarian newspaper
- StandArt, album of jazz standards by pianist Tigran Hamasyan
- Standart (magazine), print magazine about specialty coffee culture
- Standart (yacht), an Imperial Russian yacht serving Nicholas II and his family
- Standart Yacht (Fabergé egg), a jeweled egg created by the House of Fabergé
- Standarts, a series of paintings and sculptures made by German artist A. R. Penck

== See also ==
- Standard (disambiguation)
