= Stephen Rensselaer Smith =

Universalist minister

Stephen Rensselaer Smith (September 27, 1788 – February 17, 1850) was a minister of the early Universalist Church in New York.

After serving in the Oneida county area for many years, Smith was named by the state's 1831 Universalist Convention to a committee whose work paved the way for the establishment of the Clinton Liberal Institute. Wrote the Rev. A. D. Gridley in his 1874 History of the Town of Kirkland, "It is well understood and acknowledged that Rev. Stephen R. Smith, for many years a resident and preacher in Clinton, was the founder of the Institute." Repeating this quote in his 1878 History of Oneida County, author Samuel Durant credited the Rev. S.P. Landers for the description of the Institute's origins that he had contributed to Gridley's History.

A biography, Memoir of Rev. Stephen R. Smith, was authored by Universalist minister and educator Thomas Jefferson Sawyer and published in 1852.
