= Bog standard =

== See also ==
- Standard (disambiguation)
- Bollocks § Positive uses
