= Julia McEntee Dillon =

American painter

- Born: Julia McEntee; March 1, 1834; Rondout, New York, U.S.
- Died: January 21, 1919 (aged 84); Kingston, New York, U.S.
- Known for: Painting
- Spouse: John Dillon (m. 1866–1873) (his death)

Julia McEntee Dillon (March 1, 1834 – January 21, 1919) was an American painter known for her floral paintings and still lifes.

== Biography ==
Dillon née McEntee was born in 1834 in Kingston, New York. She attended the Clinton Liberal Institute where her artistic training was encouraged.

In 1866 she married foundry owner John Dillon. He died less than ten years later, compelling Julia to become involved with the administration of the company, the McEntee and Dillon Rondout Foundry. The income from the foundry helped fund her pursuit of her artistic career. Around this time she traveled to Europe where she copied old masters.

Back in New York state, she spent time in the studio of her cousin, the Hudson River School artist Jervis McEntee. In the 1880s, Dillons moved to New York City, and then back to Kingston in 1893.

Dillon exhibited her work at the Palace of Fine Arts and The Woman's Building at the 1893 World's Columbian Exposition in Chicago.

She exhibited her paintings at the National Academy of Design, the Brooklyn Art Association, the Pennsylvania Academy of the Fine Arts, and the Art Institute of Chicago.

Dillon died in 1919.

== Legacy ==
In 2005 "Julia Dillon: A Retrospective" was held at the Fred Johnston Museum in Kingston, New York.

in 2026, "A Life in Bloom: The Floral Paintings of Julia McEntee Dillon," was held at the Albany Institute of History & Art from February 14 to July 26.

== Gallery ==
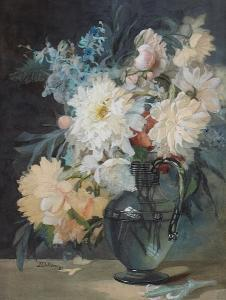
A Still Life With Peonies And Other Flowers In A Glass Vase, nd

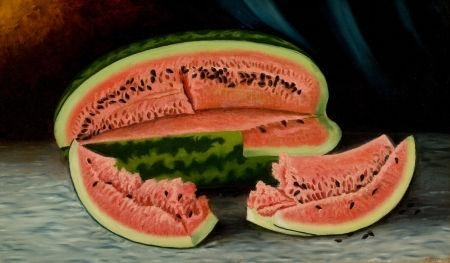
Watermelon, 1893

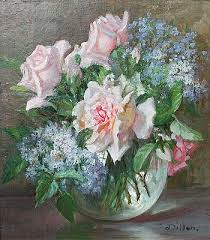
Still life, nd
