= The Daily Standard =

The Daily Standard may refer to:

- The Daily Standard (Brisbane), newspaper in Brisbane, Australia
- The Daily Standard (Missouri), newspaper in Sikeston, Missouri, United States
- The Weekly Standard

== See also ==
- Evening Standard
- The Standard (disambiguation)
