= American Standard =

American Standard may refer to:

== Brands and companies ==
- American Standard Companies, a former global manufacturer, predecessor of Trane
- American Standard Insurance Company, a subsidiary of American Family Insurance
- American Standard, a brand of plumbing fixtures made by American Standard Brands
- American Standard, a brand of HVAC equipment made by Trane
- American Standard, a line of guitars made by Fender Musical Instruments Corporation

== Music ==
- American Standard (Mary's Danish album), 1992
- American Standard (Seven Mary Three album), 1995
- American Standards (band), an American hardcore punk band from Phoenix, Arizona
- American Standard (Adams), an early composition by John Adams
- American Standard (James Taylor album), 2020
- American Standard, 2024 album by Uniform

== Other ==
- American Standard Version (ASV), of the Bible
- American Standard of Perfection, North American poultry breed standard
- American Standard Building, New York City landmark skyscraper formerly called the American Radiator Building
- American Standard Code for Information Interchange, abbreviated ASCII
- American Standard thread, another name for United States Standard thread

== See also ==
- The Standard (disambiguation)
