= National standards =

National standards may refer to:

== Standards by government bodies ==
- Chinese National Standards
- Guobiao standards, the standards issued by the Standardization Administration of China (People's Republic of China)
- Russian National Standards
- Vietnamese National Standards

== Standards by national organizations ==
- American National Standards Institute
- Brazilian National Standards Organization
- British Standards, the standards issued by BSI Group
- National Standards Authority of Ireland

== See also ==
- National reference standard, a measurement standard
- Standard (disambiguation)
- Standards organization
