= Zimbabwe Independent =

Newspaper in Zimbabwe

- Type: Weekly newspaper
- Owner: Alpha Media Holdings
- Founded: 1996; 30 years ago
- Headquarters: Harare, Zimbabwe
- Circulation: 262,000 (2003)
- Website: www.theindependent.co.zw

Zimbabwe Independent is a private weekly newspaper published from Harare, Zimbabwe. It has a business and politics focus. Its owner, Alpha Media Holdings, also publishes The Standard and NewsDay.

== See also ==
- The Standard
- NewsDay
