= Clinton Liberal Institute =

Preparatory boarding school in Clinton, New York, U.S.

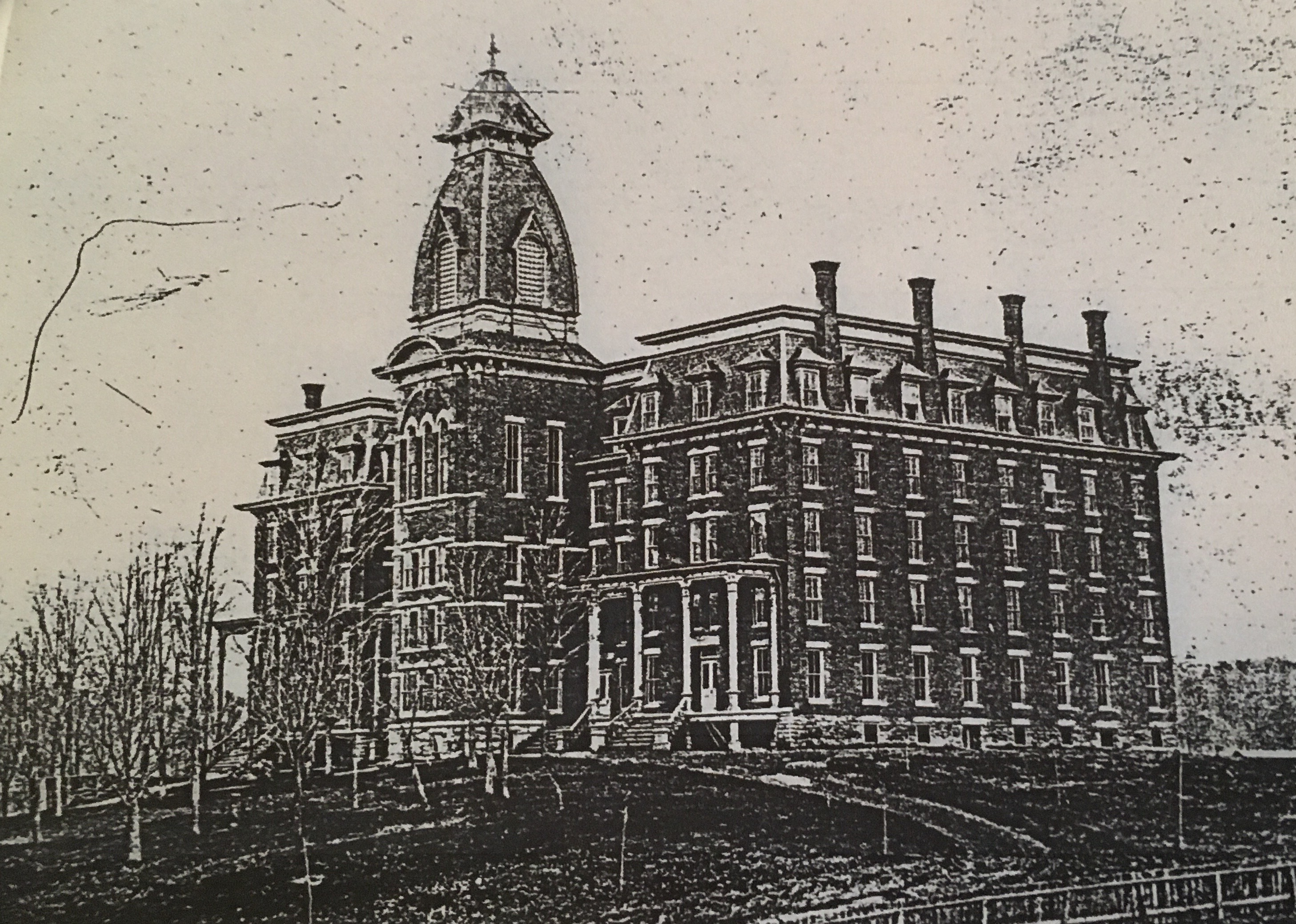
- The Clinton Liberal Institute in Fort Plain, NY
- Town of Kirkland, New York

Information
- Type: Preparatory boarding school
- Established: 1831
- Closed: 1900

The Clinton Liberal Institute was a preparatory boarding school established by the Universalist Church in the village of Clinton, in the Town of Kirkland, New York, in 1831. Its main building, a massive stone structure, was the largest building in Clinton for many years. It relocated to Fort Plain, New York, in 1878, taking over the former Fort Plain Seminary, and remaining there until its buildings were destroyed in a fire in 1900.

It was the first educational institution established by American Universalists. It was an institute of so-called religious "liberals". According to its original constitution, "Students shall in no case be persuaded by an officer or teacher to attend meetings of any denomination, and no minister of any denomination shall have the liberty to perform the service of worship within this Institute." Parents did not want their children obligated to attend the services of the sponsoring church, as for example students at the Houghton Seminary, in Clinton, were required to attend Presbyterian services. This provision was later rescinded and in 1841 a resolution of the Board of Trustees urged that "students be affectionately entreated to attend public worship."

Both male and female students studied at the Institute, but separately, with different teachers and in different buildings.

== History ==
=== Establishment ===
The Clinton Liberal Institute was the initial educational venture of the Universalist denomination in America. The need for a Universalist school, and the precedent set by the Oneida Institute, was set forth in an article in the April 30, 1831, issue of Evangelical Magazine and Gospel Advocate. According to its author, the article was "setting forth the importance to our cause, and strongly urging the necessity upon Universalists, of establishing a literary institution [non-religious school] of our own, which should be free from the intermeddling and control of the Orthodox sects, where we could send our sons and daughters for an education without their being insulted and kept under the perpetual surveillance of our religious opponents, and where our young men could receive a suitable education, preparatory to the ministry of reconciliation."

Efforts by the Universalist Church to establish a non-denominational and non-sectarian school to train ministers, in the State of New York, began in 1831. The intent of these efforts was to create a school "not only for general purposes of science and literature, but with a particular view of furnishing with an education young men designed for the ministry of reconciliation", due to the perception that other Christian schools that dominated the state were "hostile to the doctrine" of Universalism. To this end, the Clinton Liberal Institute was established in Clinton, New York, and the first students were admitted in November 1831. On April 29, 1834, the New York State Legislature passed a bill entitled "An Act to incorporate the Clinton liberal institute", formally allowing a group of eighteen trustees to create "The Clinton Liberal Institute" as a body "for the purpose of providing a literary [non-religious] seminary for the public instruction and education of youth."

No record survives explaining why Clinton was chosen, but the school's 1878 catalog offered this explanation: "[the] climate is agreeable and healthful; the citizens are intelligent, moral, and hospitable, and are deeply interested in the intellectual culture of the young. The village is exceptionally free from the vices and temptations that abound in most towns and cities. The general quiet of the place and its prevailing intellectual and moral tone are highly favorable to study and the development of true character."

=== Operation ===
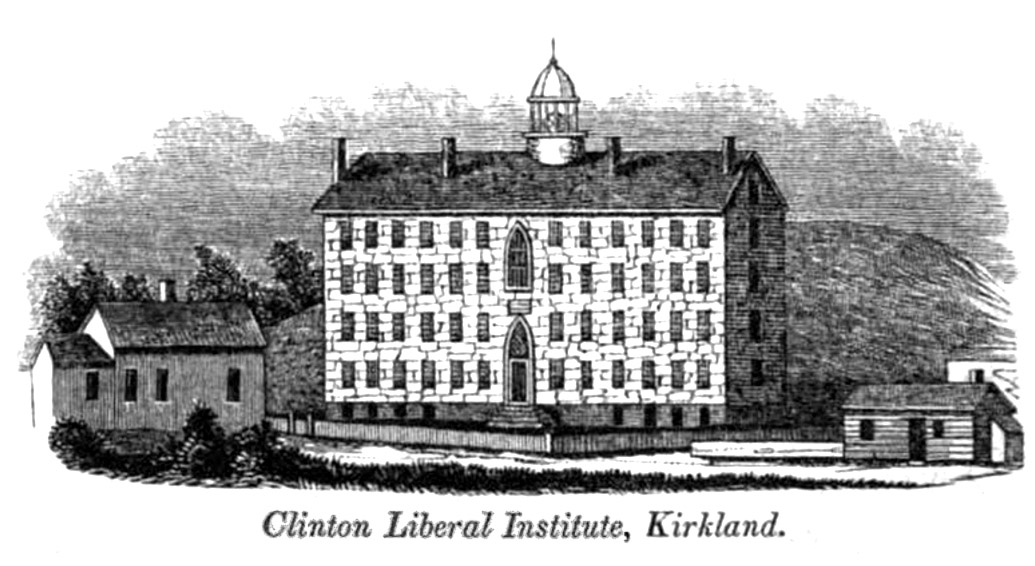
Drawing of the main (male) building of the Clinton Liberal Institute, published in Historical Collections of the State of New York in 1842. At that date Clinton had not yet been incorporated, so it is described as being in the town of Kirkland.

The original building of the Institute, located on eight acres at the southeast corner of Utica and Mulberry Streets, where male students boarded, was four stories tall (plus a basement), with a base 96 by 52 feet, built of gray stone. It cost $9,300 to build (equivalent to $281,180 in 2025) and was the largest building in Clinton. A separate wooden building for classes for women, who boarded with families, was two stories tall, and 40 by 25 feet. During the first year there were 108 students. The school was placed under the visitation of the Regents of nearby Hamilton College in 1836. By 1838 it had a library of 1,000 volumes.

The Ladies' Department was located 0.8 miles (1.25 km) away from the men's department, at Chestnut and William Streets, "pleasantly situated at the head of one of the main streets of the village, commanding a view of the whole street and West Park Row, in fact overlooking the entire village." The Ladies' Department had eight pianos.

Both male and female students had free access to the Astronomical Observatory at Hamilton College. According to the school's 1844 Catalogue, "Students will also have the privilege of attending free of charge the Scientific Lectures delivered at Hamilton College, which will comprise a complete course in Chemistry, Philosophy [physics], Geology, and Astronomy. This is an advantage which few schools of this description can enjoy, since the College is but a short walk from the Institute."

In 1839, a call for funds to retire debt stated that 1,000 youth of both sexes had been taught by the Institute.

In 1845, after much discussion within the Universalist Church about establishing a seminary in the state of New York, Reverend Thomas J. Sawyer—a leading proponent of such an establishment—took charge of the Clinton Liberal Institute. He set aside two hours per day to lecture on theology to any students who wanted to attend, at no cost to the students. He continued to offer this additional instruction until the fall of 1853, by which time efforts were underway to open a Universalist seminary elsewhere in New York. Sawyer prepared a total of 37 students to enter the ministry during this period.

According to Cunningham, in his History of Oneida County, "This institution had somewhat of a checkered career, and finally, in 1879, was removed to Fort Plain." The checkered career was the institute's precarious financial status, which threatened its survival: "through a long period the life of the school was an incessant struggle with floating debts and inadequate resources.... Repeatedly—almost periodically during its first years and not rarely later—it encountered financial storms that seemed certain to overwhelm it." The move to Fort Plain reflected the deterioration of the original buildings (the stone of the main building was later used in the construction of Carnegie Hall, on the Hamilton College campus, which opened in 1904). Fort Plain, New York is in Montgomery County. Still named the Clinton Liberal Institute, it occupied in Fort Plain the facilities of the former Fort Plain Female Seminary and Collegiate Institute. In 1887, it had a William Cullen Bryant Literary Society. In 1892, it had thirty pianos. In 1891, the Institute established a military academy (with both male and female cadets) as part of the school, adding "Military Academy" to the school name, and had an armory for the storage of artillery equipment. All of the Institute's buildings at the Fort Plain location were destroyed in a fire on March 25, 1900. The Institute's remaining resources were then transferred to Canton, New York, and merged with the theological school of St. Lawrence University.

== Associated individuals ==
=== Faculty ===
- Rev. C. B. Thummel, Principal and Professor of Languages when the school opened.
- Rev. Thomas Jefferson Sawyer, founder of Tufts College, was pastor of the Universalist church in Clinton
- Rev. Stephen Rensselaer Smith. "It is well understood and acknowledged that Rev. Stephen R. Smith, for many years a resident and preacher in Clinton, was the founder of the Institute."
- Caroline A. Soule, writer, was for two years the unpaid head of the Female Department.
- Emery H. Blair, taught mathematics, husband of Ellen A. Dayton Blair
- Ephraim Porter Felt, taught science
- Everard Enos Hatch, military instructor

=== Students (alumni) ===
- Adolphus C. Bartlett, industrialist
- Clara Barton, founder of the American Red Cross, 1850–1852
- William Biddlecome, attorney and politician
- Winchester Britton, attorney and politician
- Elizabeth Bruce, Universalist author and minister; taught drawing at the Institute in 1853–54
- Contrary to his biographers, President Grover Cleveland did not study in the Institute; he attended the Clinton Grammar School
- Bill Dahlen, baseball player
- Julia McEntee Dillon, painter
- Richard Eddy, Universalist clergyman
- Matilda Joslyn Gage, suffragist
- Francis H. Gates, politician
- Garwood L. Judd, attorney, member New York State Assembly
- Jeremiah Keck, lawyer and politician
- Philip Keck, lawyer, judge, and politician
- Simon Lake, inventor of the modern submarine; attended in Fort Plain
- Charles H. Leonard (1822–1918), dean of the Tufts Divinity School
- Ebenezer Lewis, Esq. (1819–1878), attorney, active in Wales and missionary work, trustee of the Oneida Institute
- Jervis McEntee, painter
- Stillman T. Meservey, banker, industrialist, member of Iowa General Assembly
- Bernard Peters, minister, editor of the Brooklyn Daily Times
- Oscar Rathbun, Lieutenant Governor of Rhode Island
- Clinton Scollard, writer, professor at Hamilton College
- Charles R. Skinner, U.S. Representative
- Joseph G. Standart, businessman
- Charles Stanford, merchant, newspaper publisher and politician, brother of Leland Stanford, attended in 1844. Another brother, DeWitt, attended in 1843.
- Leland Stanford, Governor of California, U.S. Senator, and founder of Stanford University He attended in 1844 and transferred with Charles to the Cazenovia Seminary in 1845.
- Farris B. Streeter, Solicitor of the United States Treasury
- Isaac Tripp (1821–1902), lawyer
- John Wieting, doctor and philanthropist
- George E. Williams, newspaper publisher and politician
- Pardon C. Williams, lawyer and judge
- Oren Elbridge Wilson, mayor of Albany, New York.

== Archival material ==
- Archival materials are held in the St. Lawrence University Museum, Canton, New York. New York State Historical Documents, Albany, New York, holds 11 items, including lists of students and instructors, from the Fort Plain period.
