= Mors (automobile) =

Defunct French motor vehicle manufacturer

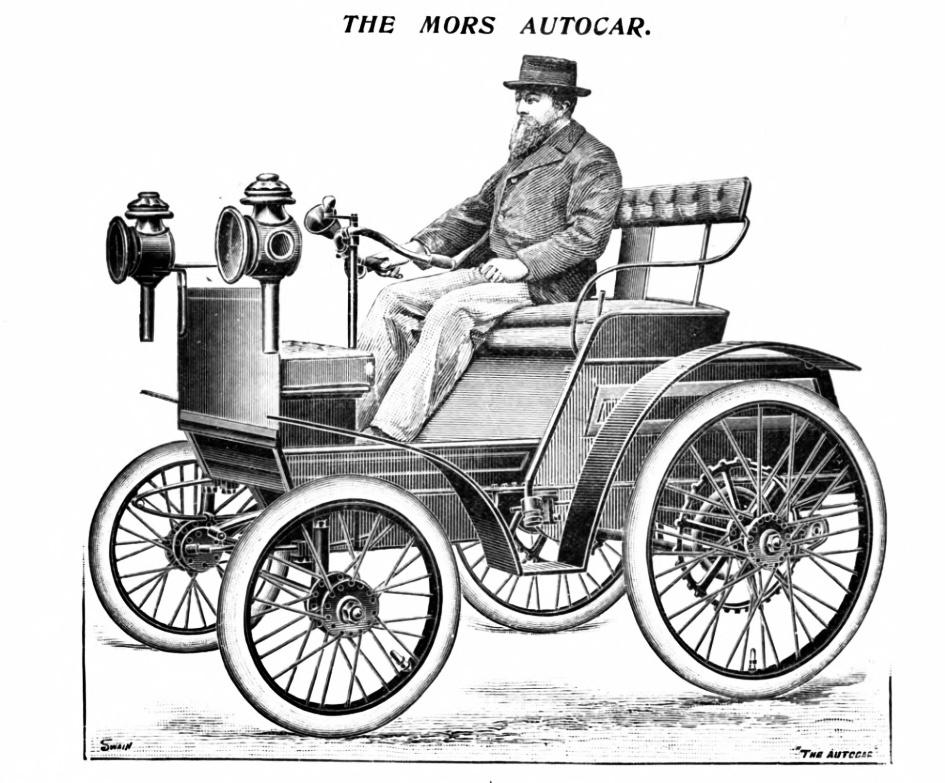
Mors (1897)

Mors 6CV dogcart from 1898

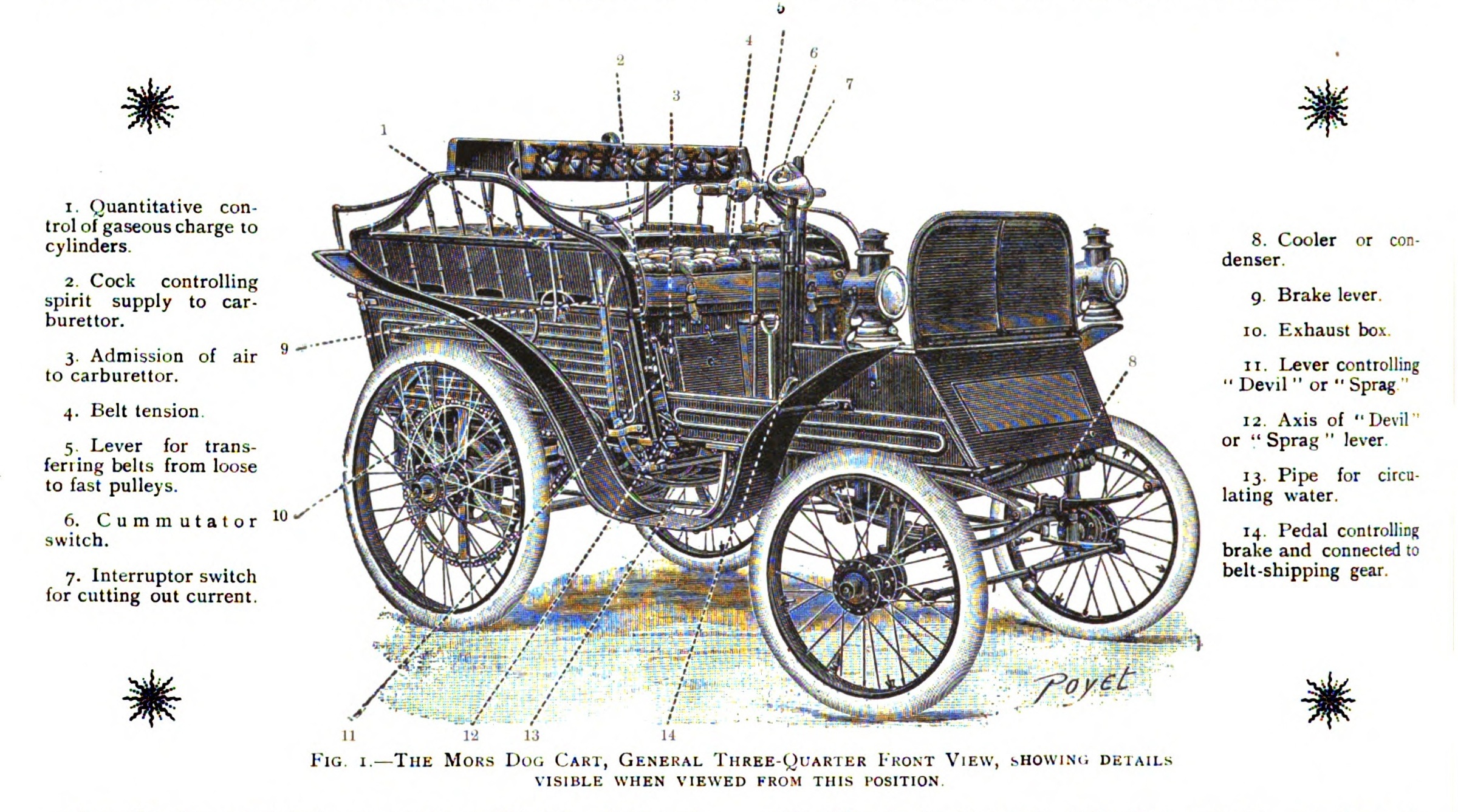
Explanatory diagram: 1899 Mors dogcart

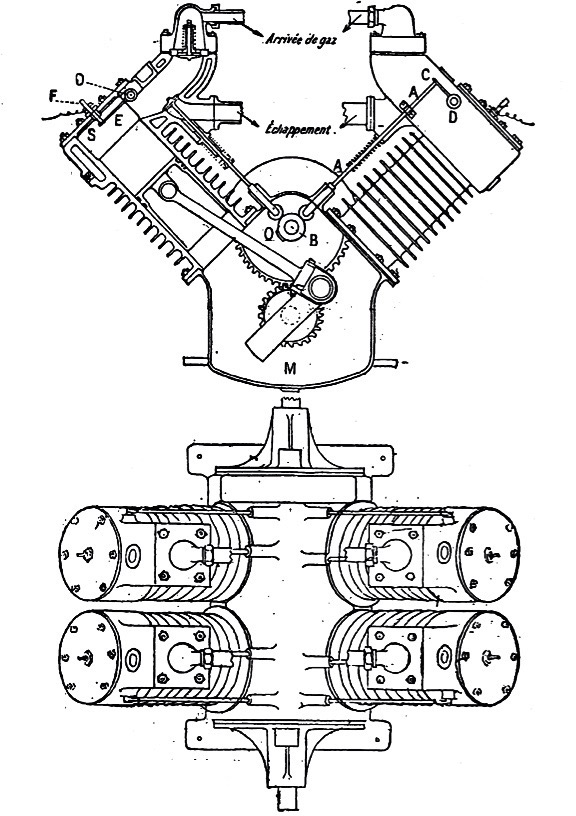
V engine Mors (1897)

The Mors automobile factory was an early French car manufacturer. It was one of the first to take part in automobile racing, beginning in 1897, due to the belief of the company founder, Émile Mors, in racing's technical and promotional benefits. By the turn of the century, automobile racing had become largely a contest between Mors and Panhard et Levassor.

== Technical achievements ==
Mors was one of the first automobiles to use the V engine configuration. The Mors 60 horsepower Grand Prix car was powered by a 9.2-litre V4 side valve engine, with magneto ignition and dry sump lubrication, which could reach 950 rpm. The car had a steel chassis and a four-speed transmission that drove the rear wheels via chain drive, and rear-wheel brakes. In 1902, Mors added pneumatic shock absorbers to their cars, which represented a great leap forward given the quality of the roads and racetracks at the time. With this car, Henri Fournier was able to win the highly significant Paris-Berlin race, with the drive chain breaking immediately afterwards.

Mors ended racing in 1908. Plans to return to auto racing were cancelled due to World War I.

== Citroën ==
André Citroën became chairman of Mors in 1908 and restored the company's viability. In 1925, Citroën bought Mors outright and closed it down, using its factory for the production of his Citroën automobiles.

== Range ==
The company produced a number of models which were sold widely in Europe and in the USA. In 1905 these ranged from 2.3 litres to the 8.1 litre 40/52 HP and by 1914 Minerva-built Knight sleeve valve engines replaced side-valve units in the larger cars. Post-1918 only sleeve valve engines were used. Citroën's chevron gears were used for the bevel drive rear axles from 1914 and a unique feature was the Mors patented clutch, which had a contracting band system which replaced the cone clutch used until 1903.

The marque was resurrected briefly when a few small electric cars were made during World War II by a subsidiary electrical company of Émile Mors.

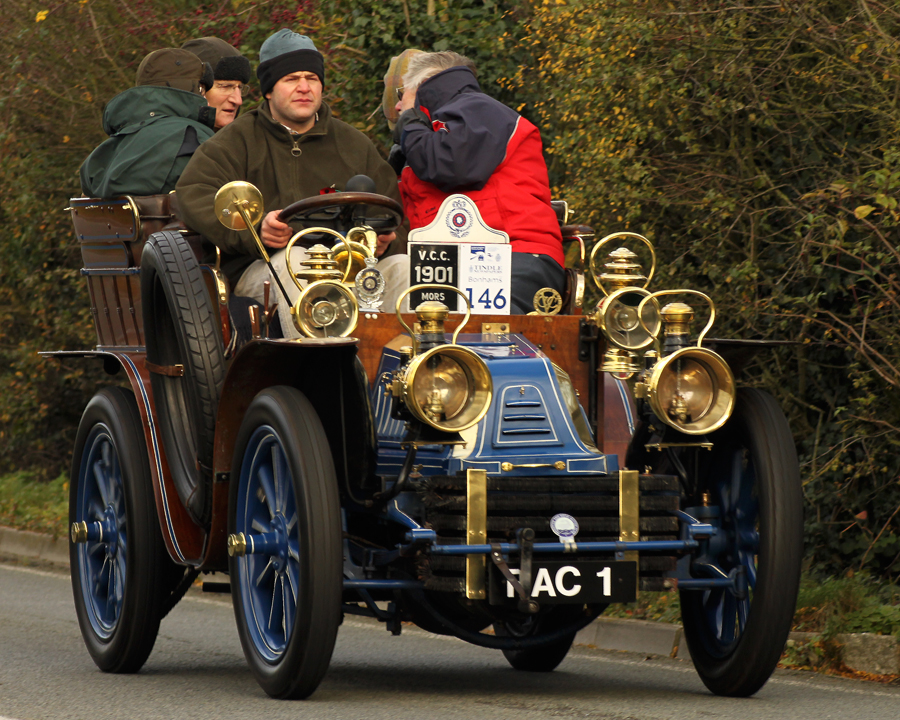
Mors 10HP tonneau from 1901 owner The Royal Automobile Club

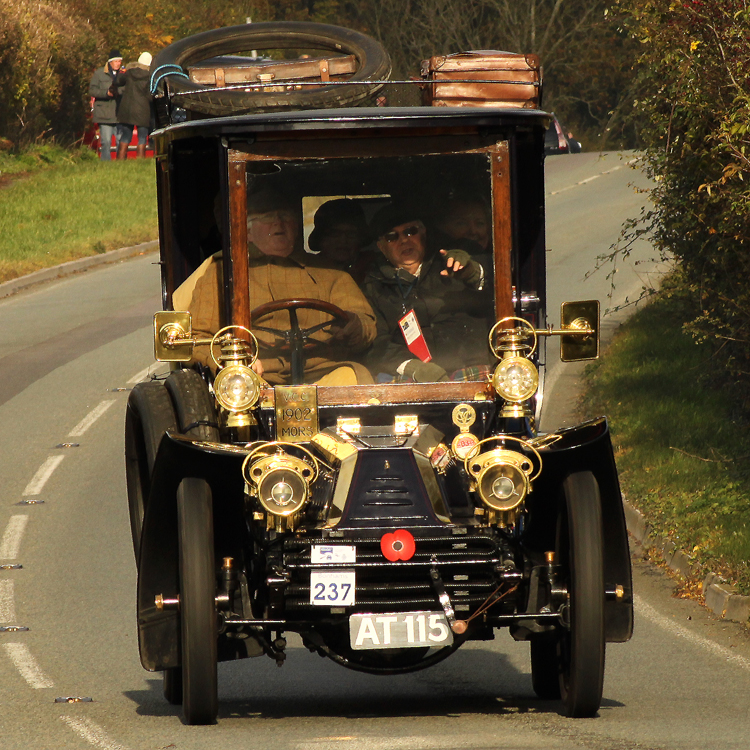
Mors 16HP limousine from 1902

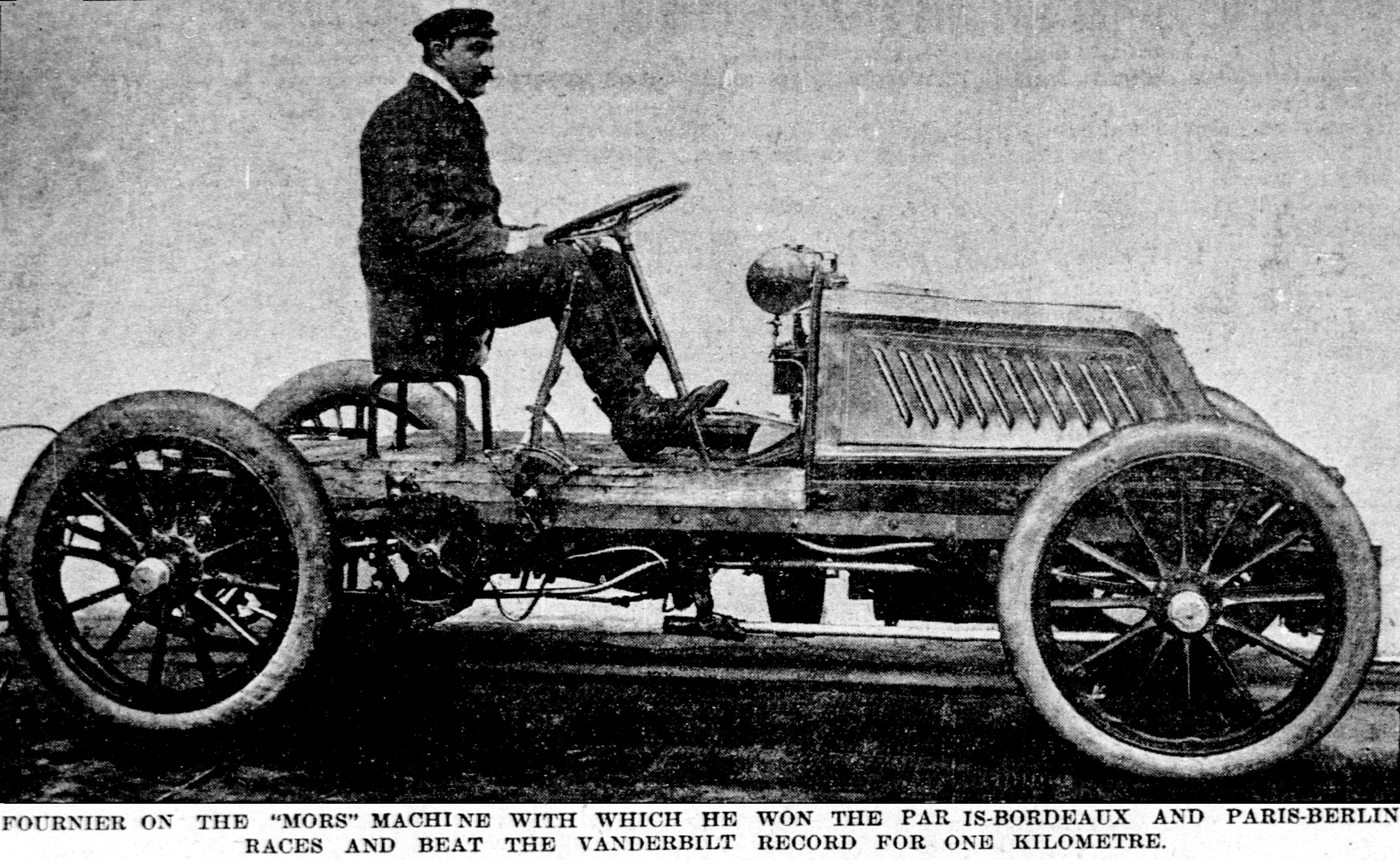
Henri Fournier on the "Mors Machine", 1902

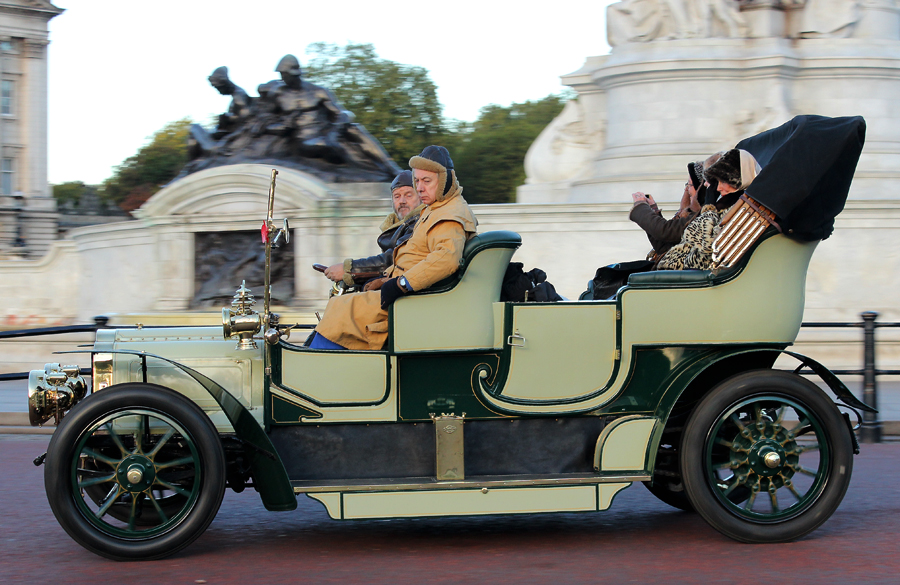
Mors32 HP Roi-des-Belges 1904

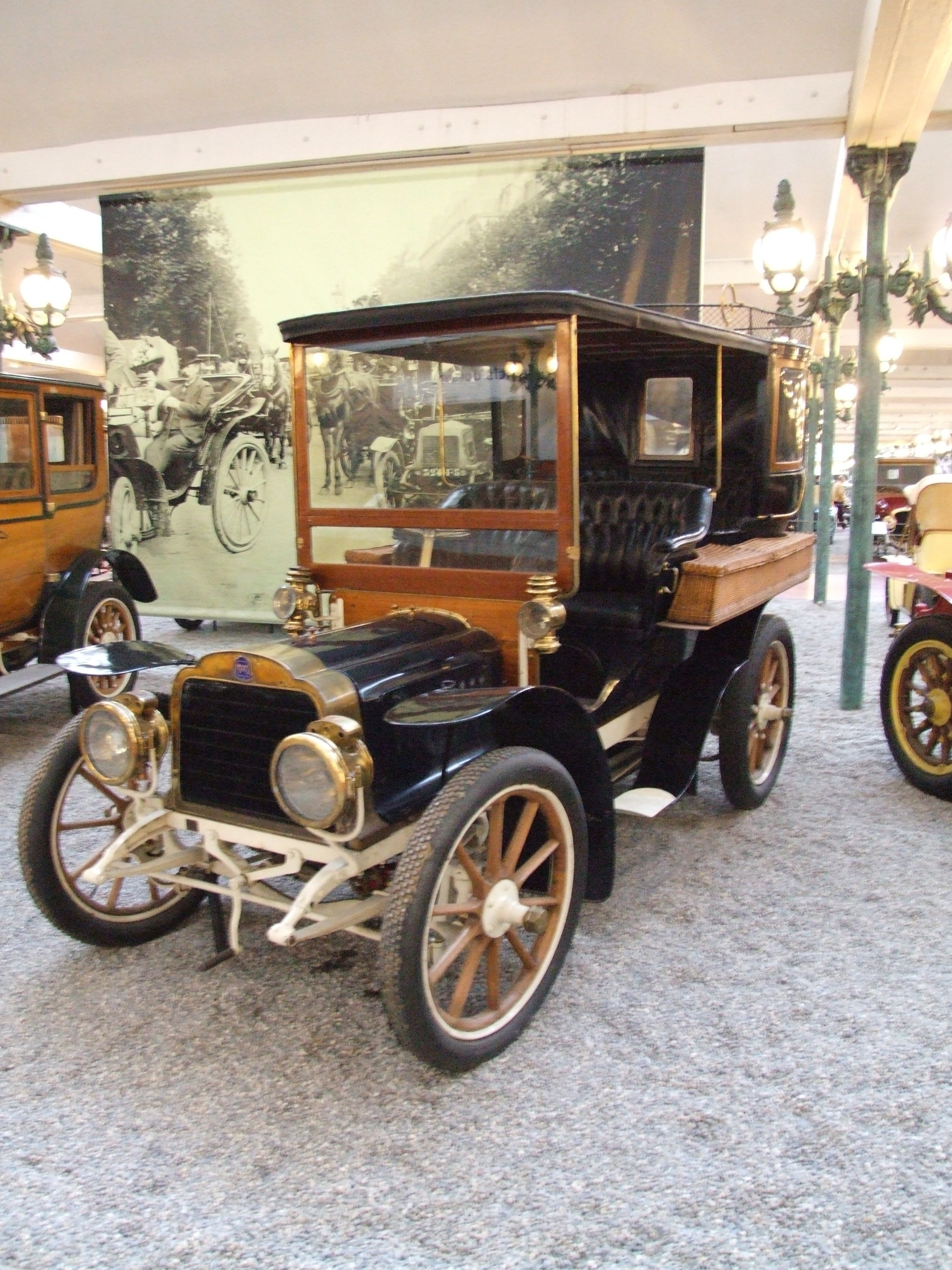
Mors tonneau fermé Type N, 4 cylinder, 1809 cc, 1910. 60 km/h, Cité de l'Automobile, Mulhouse, France

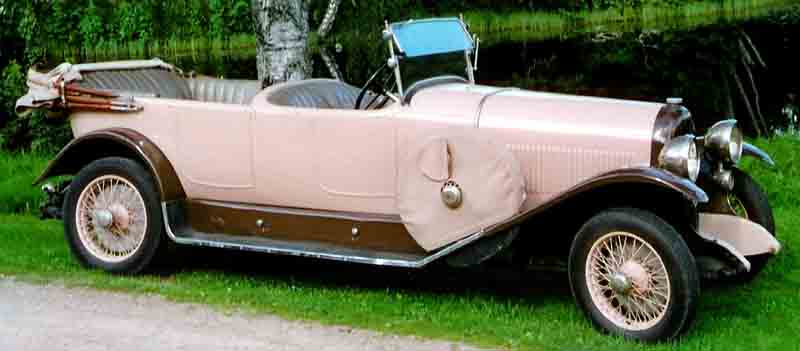
Last Mors model: 1925 12/16HP sport

== Central Automobile Company ==
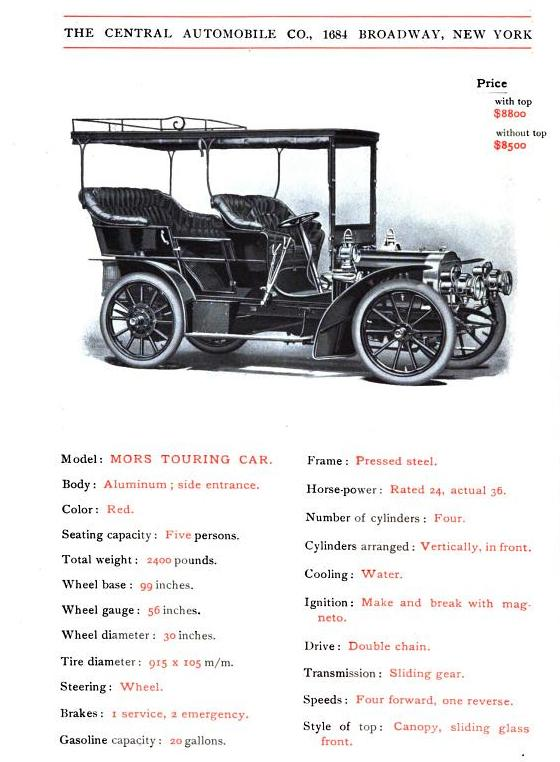
1905 Mors Touring Car. Central Automobile Co.

Central Automobile Company was the US importer of Mors automobiles in New York, New York in the very early part of the 20th century.

The 1904 Mors 18 HP was a touring car. Equipped with a tonneau, it could seat 4 to 6 passengers and sold for a high US$8000. The vertically mounted water-cooled straight-4, situated at the front of the car, produced 18 HP (13.4 kW). A 4-speed transmission was fitted. The pressed steel-framed car was quite modern, with a cellular radiator (with fan) and a throttle control. The Mors 11 HP sold for US$5000.

== American Mors ==
The St. Louis Car Company also manufactured the American Mors. After manufacturing the St. Louis and Kobusch cars, the latter of which looked like a Mors, in 1906 the St. Louis Car Company acquired an official license, blueprints, and plans from the Parisian factory to manufacture Mors cars in the U.S. After making the American Mors for three years, the company turned to the manufacture of a car of their own design, the Standard Six.

== Sources ==
- Frank Leslie's Popular Monthly (January, 1904)
- Georgano, Nick (Ed.). The Beaulieu Encyclopedia of the Automobile (Volume 2). Chicago: Fitzroy Dearborn, 2000. ISBN 1-57958-293-1
- Kimes, Beverley Rae, & Clark Jr, Henry Austin. Standard Catalog of American cars: 1805-1942 (Third Edition). Iola, WI: Krause, 1996. ISBN 0-87341-428-4
