= Garwood L. Judd =

American lawyer and politician

Garwood Leverett Judd (July 4, 1823 – January 1, 1902) was an American lawyer and politician from New York.

== Life ==
Judd was born on July 4, 1823, in Augusta, New York. He was the son of John W. Judd and Comfort Greenman. The family moved to Frankfort, New York when he was 7.

Judd attended the Augusta Academy and graduated from the Clinton Liberal Institute in 1844. He read law in Frankfort and was admitted to the state bar in 1850. He was later admitted to practice in the Supreme Court of the United States as a proctor and advocate in admiralty.

Between 1848 and 1849, Judd baggage master of what would become the New York Central Railroad. In 1853, he moved to North Tonawanda, where over the years he served as an associate judge of the county court, justice of the peace, town superintendent of schools, village clerk, president of the board of health, and other public positions. When the Erie Canal was being enlarged, he worked under William J. McAlpine and William B. Taylor. He drew up the papers that incorporated North Tonawanda as a separate village from Tonawanda. He was a freemason since 1849.

In 1890, Judd was elected to the New York State Assembly as a Democrat, representing Niagara County, 1st District. He served in the Assembly in 1891 and 1892.

Judd married Maria A. Pryne in 1850. They had one daughter, Mary E. Edmonds.

Judd died at home on January 1, 1902. He was buried in the Sweeney Cemetery in North Tonawanda.

New York State Assembly
Preceded by Ruthven Kill	New York State Assembly; Niagara County, 1st District; 1891-1892	Succeeded by District Abolished
