= The Standard =

The Standard may refer to:

== Entertainment ==
- The Standard (band), an indie rock band from Portland, Oregon
- The Standard (novel), a 1934 novel by the Austrian writer Alexander Lernet-Holenia
- The Standard (Tommy Flanagan album), 1980
- The Standard (Take 6 album), 2008
- The Standard (TV series), a series produced by BBC Scotland in 1978
- The Standard, a TV program broadcast by CHNU-DT

== Newspapers ==
- The Standard (Buenos Aires), an English language newspaper (1861–1959)
- The Standard (Hong Kong), an English free newspaper in Hong Kong
- The Standard (London newspaper), founded in 1827, later renamed The Evening Standard and The London Standard
- The Standard (Kenya), one of the largest newspapers in Kenya
- Montreal Standard, a national weekly newspaper published in Canada from 1905 until 1951
- The Standard (Philippines), or The Manila Standard, a daily newspaper in the Philippines
- The Port Melbourne Standard, earlier The Standard (Port Melbourne), a defunct Australian weekly
- The San Francisco Standard, online news site
- St. Catharines Standard has a masthead name of The Standard, a daily newspaper published in St. Catharines, Ontario since 1891
- The Standard (Zimbabwe), a weekly newspaper in Zimbabwe
- North Carolina Standard, an English weekly, semi-weekly, and daily newspaper in the U.S. state of North Carolina (1834–c.1870)

== Other ==
- Standard Insurance Company, an insurance company headquartered in Portland, Oregon, branded as The Standard
- The Standard, Copenhagen, a jazz club and restaurant complex
- The Standard, East Village, a hotel in New York City
- The Standard, High Line, a hotel in New York City
- thestandard.com, a news website based in the U.S.
- Standard Hotels, hotel chain

== See also ==
- De Standaard, a Belgian newspaper
- Der Standard, an Austrian newspaper
- The Weekly Standard, an American neoconservative magazine, sometimes abbreviated The Standard
- American Standard (disambiguation)
- Standard (disambiguation)
- Standard American English (disambiguation)
