= Richard Eddy (clergyman) =

American clergyman and historian

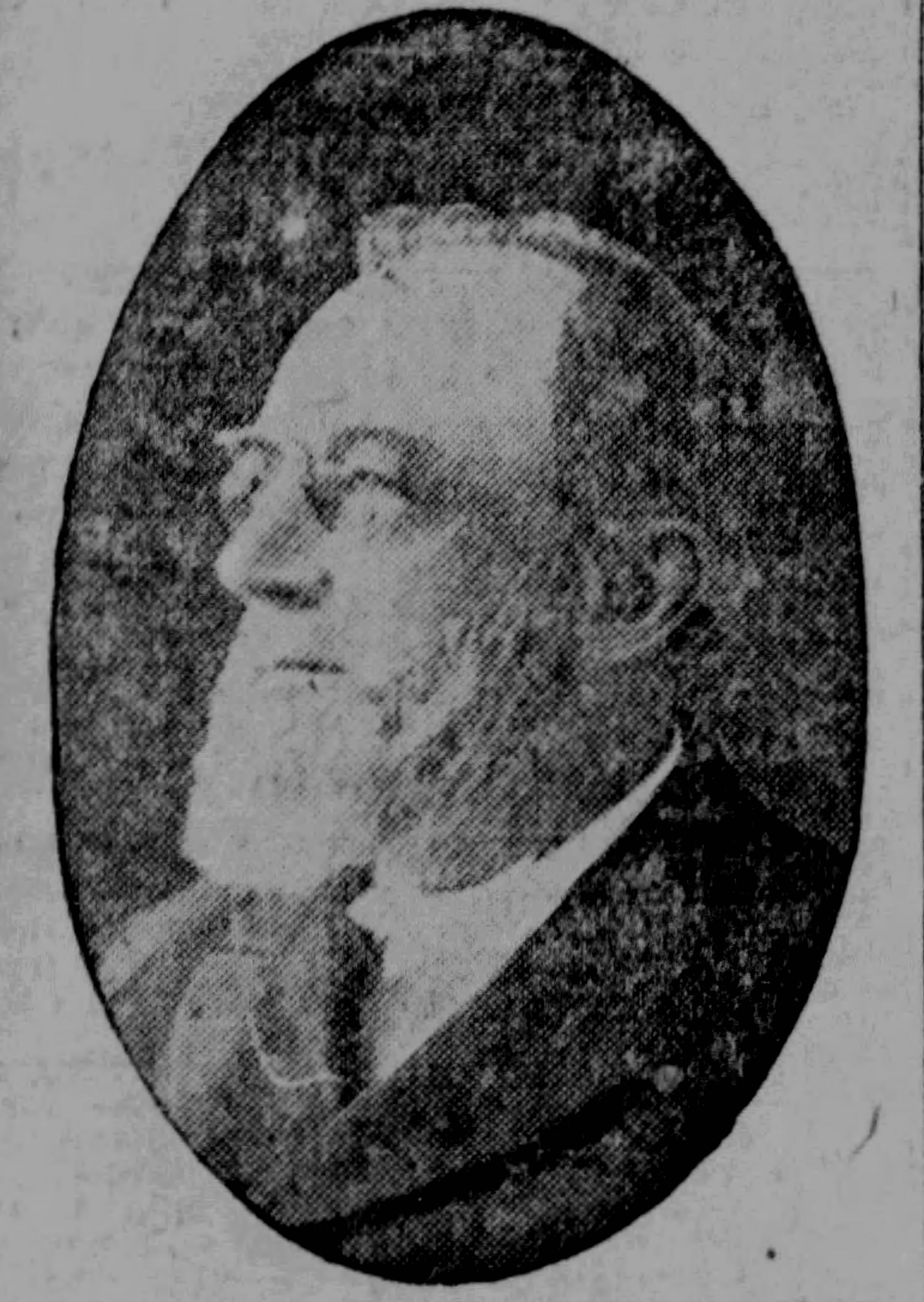

Richard Eddy, D.D. (21 June 1828 – 16 August 1906) was an American Universalist clergyman, born at Providence, R. I. He was a chaplain of the Sixtieth New York Volunteers during the American Civil War. From 1877 to 1906 he was president of the Universalist Historical Society and from 1886 to 1891 he was editor of the Universalist Register.

== Biography ==
Richard Eddy was born in Providence, Rhode Island, June 21, 1828, to Richard Eddy and Martha James. He was a descendant of Zachariah Eddy, an early immigrant. He was educated in the public schools of Providence. His parents were associated with the First Universalist Church.

Eddy learned bookbinding as a young man. In 1848, he began studying theology under the Rev. Thomas J. Sawyer at the Clinton Liberal Institute, Clinton, New York. He remained there for two years. He was ordained in Frankfort, New York, in 1850. He later wrote a biography of Thomas J. Sawyer and his wife, Caroline A. Sawyer.

Eddy held pastorates in Rome, Buffalo, ad Canton, New York (where he served during the Civil War); Philadelphia, where he also served as librarian of the Pennsylvania Historical Society; Franklin, Massachusetts, and Gloucester, Massachusetts where, as pastor of the church which welcomed in 1870 the Centennial Convention, he received high regard as an organizer and executive; Akron, Ohio, and Melrose, Massachusetts. Later in his career, he served in interim or supply positions. His final pastoral residence was in Chatham, Massachusetts, where he remained until his retirement due to illness.

According to Eddy’s personal notebook, he preached 6,786 sermons, delivered 2,400 lectures, and officiated at 2,362 funerals and 375 weddings.

Eddy during the Civil War served the 60th N. Y. Volunteer Infantry as Chaplain for nineteen months. He was a faithful Chaplain and rendered that service which gained for him a permanent hold upon the soldiers during the war, and in the ranks of the veterans in the years since. He wrote a history of the Regiment soon after the war.

Eddy was active in the temperance movement from a young age. He served as a leader of the Independent Order of Good Templars in Massachusetts. He wrote two books for the American Temperance Society: Alcohol in History and Alcohol in Society.

Richard Eddy wrote Universalism in America, a two‑volume history of the Universalist Church. He also contributed the volume on Universalism to the American Church History series and wrote articles on the church for several encyclopedias. In 1887, he became editor of The Universalist Register, a position he held for nineteen years.

Eddy became editor of The Universalist Quarterly in October 1886. He had previously served as assistant to the Rev. T. B. Thayer beginning in January 1885, and continued in that role until the journal ceased publication in 1891. Before becoming editor, he contributed articles to the journal, including an 1874 series titled “The Universalist Convention and Its Creeds.” He also wrote articles on "Judith Murray" and on "the Universalist origins of the American Sunday school".

Eddy held various leadership roles within the Universalist denomination. He served as Standing Clerk of the General Convention from 1861 to 1867 and was active in efforts to unify Universalist congregations into a single General Convention, which was achieved in 1866. He was pastor in Gloucester, Massachusetts, when the convention met there in 1870 to mark the centennial of John Murray’s arrival in the United States. He served as president of the Universalist Historical Society from 1878. In 1883, Tufts College awarded him the degree of Doctor of Sacred Theology (S.T.D.).

== Personal life ==
In 1852, Eddy married Sarah Stoddard of Hudson, New York, with whom he had five children. He later married Lucy P. Friend of Gloucester, who survived him. He died suddenly in Gloucester on August 16, 1906. His funeral was held the following Sunday at the Independent (First Universalist) Church.

== Selected works ==
- History of Universalism in America, 1636-1886 (1884–86)
- Alcohol in History (1887)
- Universalism in Gloucester, Mass. (1892)
- History of Universalism, 120-1890, A. D. (1894)
- Life of Thomas J. Sawyer, D. D., and Caroline M. Sawyer (1900)
