= STD (disambiguation) =

STD is a sexually transmitted disease.

STD or std may also refer to:

== Businesses and organizations ==
- STD of RSFSR, a Russian actors' trade union
- STD Motors, an early English car manufacturer

== Finance ==
- São Tomé and Príncipe dobra, a currency (by ISO 4217 code)
- Short term disability, a disability insurance term

== Places ==
- Mayor Buenaventura Vivas Airport, Santo Domingo, Venezuela (by IATA code)
- Strathclyde, former administrative area of Scotland (by genealogical Chapman code)
- Stroud railway station, Gloucestershire, England (by GBR station code)

== Science and technology ==
- std. dev., std. deviation, σ, SD, or STD often refers to standard deviation, a measure of uncertainty or variation in data.
- std, a common abbreviation for the standard library in many programming languages, or the standard library namespace
  - the C++ Standard Library namespace
  - the D standard library namespace
  - the Rust standard library namespace
- STD Bus, a computer bus
- Internet Standards (such as STD 68)
- Subscriber trunk dialling for long-distance telephony

== Other uses ==
- Doctor of Sacred Theology (Sacrae Theologiae Doctor), a Catholic academic degree
- Star Trek: Discovery, a U.S. science-fiction TV series
- S.T.D (Shelters to Deltas), a 2016 mixtape by Cupcakke
- Sentinelese language, an ISO 639-3 code

== See also ==
- Standard (disambiguation)
