= Vietnam Standards =

Vietnamese national technical standards.

TCVN's logo and marker.

Vietnamese Standards (TCVN; Vietnamese: Tiêu chuẩn Việt Nam, lit. 'Standards of Viet Nam'), or the Vietnam National Standards (Vietnamese: Tiêu chuẩn Quốc gia Việt Nam, lit. 'National Standards of Vietnam'), are the nationally-nominated technical standards of Vietnam, issued by the Vietnam National Standards & Quality Institute (VSQI; Viện Tiêu chuẩn Chất lượng Việt Nam) under the national Commission for the Standards, Metrology and Quality (STAMEQ; Ủy ban Tiêu chuẩn Đo lường Chất lượng Quốc gia). These standards are identified by the prefix "TCVN" followed by a number, a colon, and the year issued. For instance, "TCVN 4980:2006" refers to the national standard numbered 4980, issued in 2006.

Thousands of TCVNs have been issued for terminology, technology, experimentation and sampling procedures, labeling, packaging, transportation, and maintenance in areas such as mechanics, metallurgy, communication and transportation, construction, chemicals, petroleum, minerals, agriculture, food, consumer products, environment, safety, electricity, electronics, and informatics.

A 2017 Vietnam Standards List

Some wide-reaching standards include: TCVN 5712, standardizing the Telex input method; TCVN 6909, standardizing the Vietnamese character set as a subset of Unicode 3.1; and TCVN ISO 9001 (equivalent to ISO 9001), regarding quality control systems.

== See also ==
- GOST
- Japanese Industrial Standards (JIS)
- National standards (disambiguation)

== External links and official repositories ==
- Commission for the Standards, Metrology and Quality of Viet Nam
  - Vietnam National Standards & Quality Institute
    - VSQI's TCVN/QCVN Data Portal (in Vietnamese)
