= Stillman T. Meservey =

American businessman and politician (1848–1927)

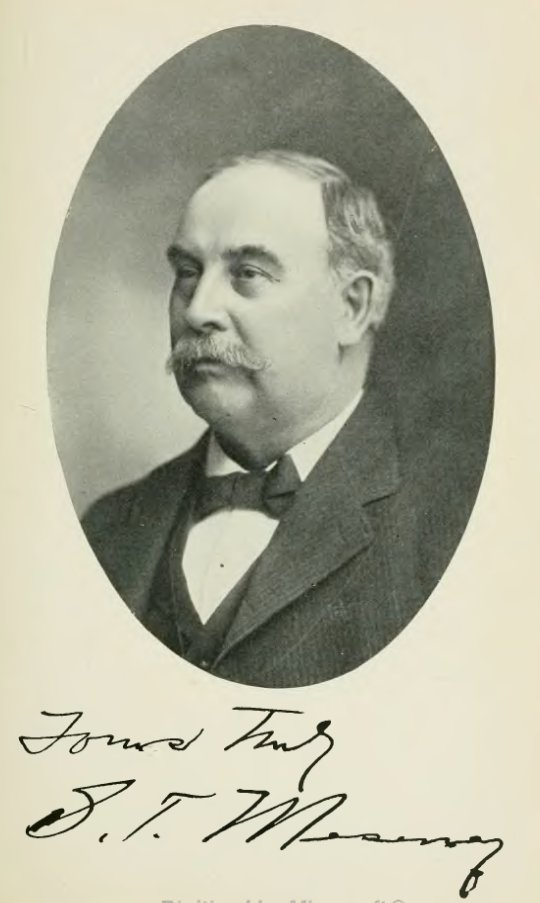

Stillman T. Meservey (December 17, 1848 – August 5, 1927) was an American businessman and politician who served as a member of the Iowa General Assembly.

== Early life, education, and career ==
Born in DeWitt, Illinois, Meservey was educated in the public schools and at Clinton Liberal Institute in New York. He moved with his father to Homer, then in Webster County, Iowa, in 1854, settling in Fort Dodge.

Meservey spent a large part of his life in Iowa, where he was prominently connected with Republican politics for many years.

== Political and business activities ==
He was mayor of Fort Dodge, Iowa, for three terms, and in 1885 was elected to the Iowa General Assembly as Representative in the House of the Twenty-first General Assembly, and in 1902 he was again a member, in the Twenty-ninth Assembly. He was one of the three Fort Dodge men who were the pioneers in developing the great gypsum deposits in that vicinity and became one of the directors of the Iowa Plaster Association. He was for a long time president of the First National Bank of Fort Dodge and of the Fort Dodge Power & Light Company.

He was a friend of President Calvin Coolidge, and was noted for the campaigns he conducted in behalf of Iowa Senators Jonathan P. Dolliver and William S. Kenyon. He later moved to Chicago, and was one of the founders of United States Gypsum, of which he was an official. He was president of the Hamilton club in 1921.

Meservey died at the Illinois Masonic hospital at the age of 78. His funeral was held in Chicago, and his body was taken to Fort Dodge, Iowa, for burial.
