= Pardon C. Williams =

American judge

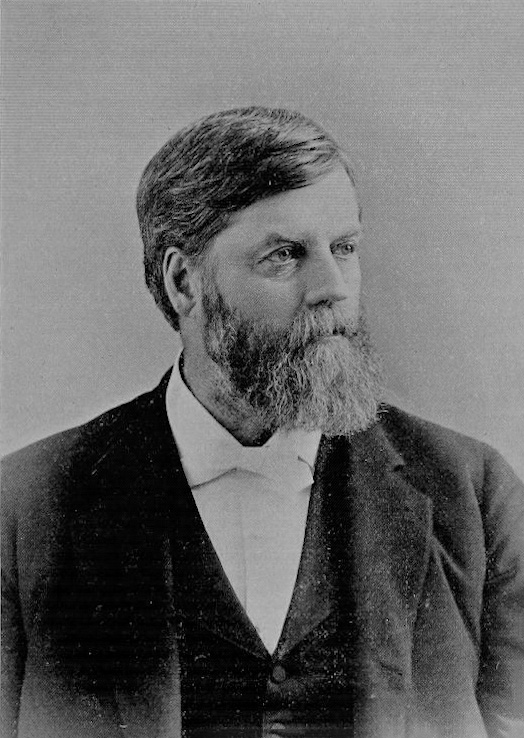

Pardon Clarence Williams (July 12, 1842 – January 18, 1925) was an American lawyer and judge from New York.

== Life ==
Williams was born on July 12, 1842, in Ellisburg, New York, the son of farmer William Williams Jr. and Jerusha Plummer.

Williams attended school in Pierrepont Manor. He then went to Union Academy in Belleville and the Clinton Liberal Institute. He spent two years at St. Lawrence University. He began teaching when he was 14 and spent the next six winters as a teacher while working on the family farm in the summers. In 1862, he moved to Watertown and began studying law in the firm Hammond & Bigelow. He was admitted to the bar in 1863. He then became a member of the firm Hammond & Williams, Bigelow having become an editor of the Watertown Times. General Bradley Winslow later joined the firm, which was renamed Hammond, Winslow & Williams. In 1867, he began practicing law without a partner. In 1868, he was elected District Attorney of Jefferson County, an office he served for two terms and held until 1875. Later that year, he formed a partnership with Judge John C. McCartin and Williams.

In 1883, Williams was elected a justice of the New York Supreme Court, 5th Judicial District. He began serving as Justice in 1884. After his 14 year term, although he was elected as a Republican, he was re-elected with the endorsement of both Republicans and Democrats. In 1895, Governor Levi P. Morton appointed him an associate justice of the Appellate Division of the New York Supreme Court, First Judicial Department in New York City. He left the Appellate Division when his term expired in 1898. The local people didn't like that he had to leave his district for New York City, so he promised to remain in the Fifth Judicial District. In 1900, he was appointed an associate justice of the Appellate Division, Fourth Department, which included that district. He retired as Justice in 1912.

As Justice, he presided over a number of murder trials, including for Roxana Druse. He developed a reputation for fairness that led Governor Flower to specifically select him as judge for the trial of Bartholomew Shea and John McGough for the murder of Robert Ross.

Williams was a leading member of the Republican Party in Jefferson County. He was a director of the Agricultural Insurance Company. He was a member of the Jefferson County Bar Association, the New York State Bar Association, and the American Bar Association. He attended the Trinity Episcopal Church. In 1868, he married Sarah E. Hewitt of Watertown. Their children were Edith, Robert Plummer, and Marguitte. Robert was a clerk for his father.

Williams died at home on January 18, 1925. He was buried in Brookside Cemetery.
