= Charles H. Leonard =

American minister, theologian, and academic (1822–1918)

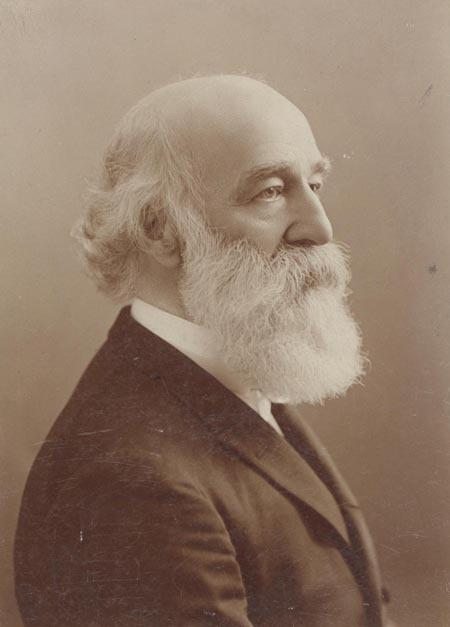
Charles H. Leonard in 1887

Charles Hall Leonard (September 16, 1822 – August 27, 1918) was an American Universalist minister, theologian, and academic who served as dean of the Tufts Divinity School from 1892 to 1910.

== Early life, education, and career ==
Born in Northwood, New Hampshire, Leonard's family moved to Haverhill, Massachusetts, where he was educated in the common schools, and then at Haverhill Academy, Bradford Seminary, and Atkinson Academy in New Hampshire. After teaching at Bradford Seminary for several years, he abandoned plans to enter the Congregational ministry and embraced Universalism. He studied theology under Thomas Jefferson Sawyer at the Clinton Liberal Institute in Canton, New York, graduating and being ordained in 1848.

In 1848 Leonard accepted a call to the Universalist church in Chelsea, Massachusetts, where he remained pastor for twenty-three years. During his pastorate the congregation grew from about twenty families to nearly four hundred, and its Sunday school expanded to approximately six hundred members. In 1856 he established an annual Children's Sunday observance, which later became adopted by churches of numerous denominations. During the summer of 1858, Leonard traveled in Europe.

== Academic career ==
In 1869, Leonard was named Goddard Professor of Homiletics and Pastoral Theology at the newly established Tufts Divinity School, there reuniting with his theological instructor, Sawyer, who was its founding dean. Sawyer retired from active service in 1884, and Leonard then became leader of the institution, and was formally installed as dean in 1892. He continued in that capacity until his retirement in 1910.

In addition to his teaching, Leonard raised funds for the divinity school, expanded its library, established professorships, and supported ministerial students. He was also on the Board of Examiners of Harvard College, and was active in the Boston Ministers' Club. Tufts awarded him an honorary Master of Arts degree in 1869, and in 1881 St. Lawrence University conferred upon him the honorary degree of Doctor of Sacred Theology in 1881.

Leonard was the anonymous compiler of A Book of Prayer for the Church and the Home, a hymnal and service book that became widely used in Universalist churches. He also authored various works on preaching and theology, including Steps in Belief and The Ministry We Need.

During his career, Leonard also served for twenty-two years on the Chelsea School Board and as chairman of the city's Board of Supervisors, where he helped establish Chelsea High School.

== Personal life and death ==
Leonard married Phebe Bassett of Atkinson, New Hampshire, in 1848. They had three children, one of whom died in early adulthood. Phebe died in 1872.

Leonard died in his home in Somerville at the age of 95.
