= Jervis McEntee =

American painter (1828–1891)

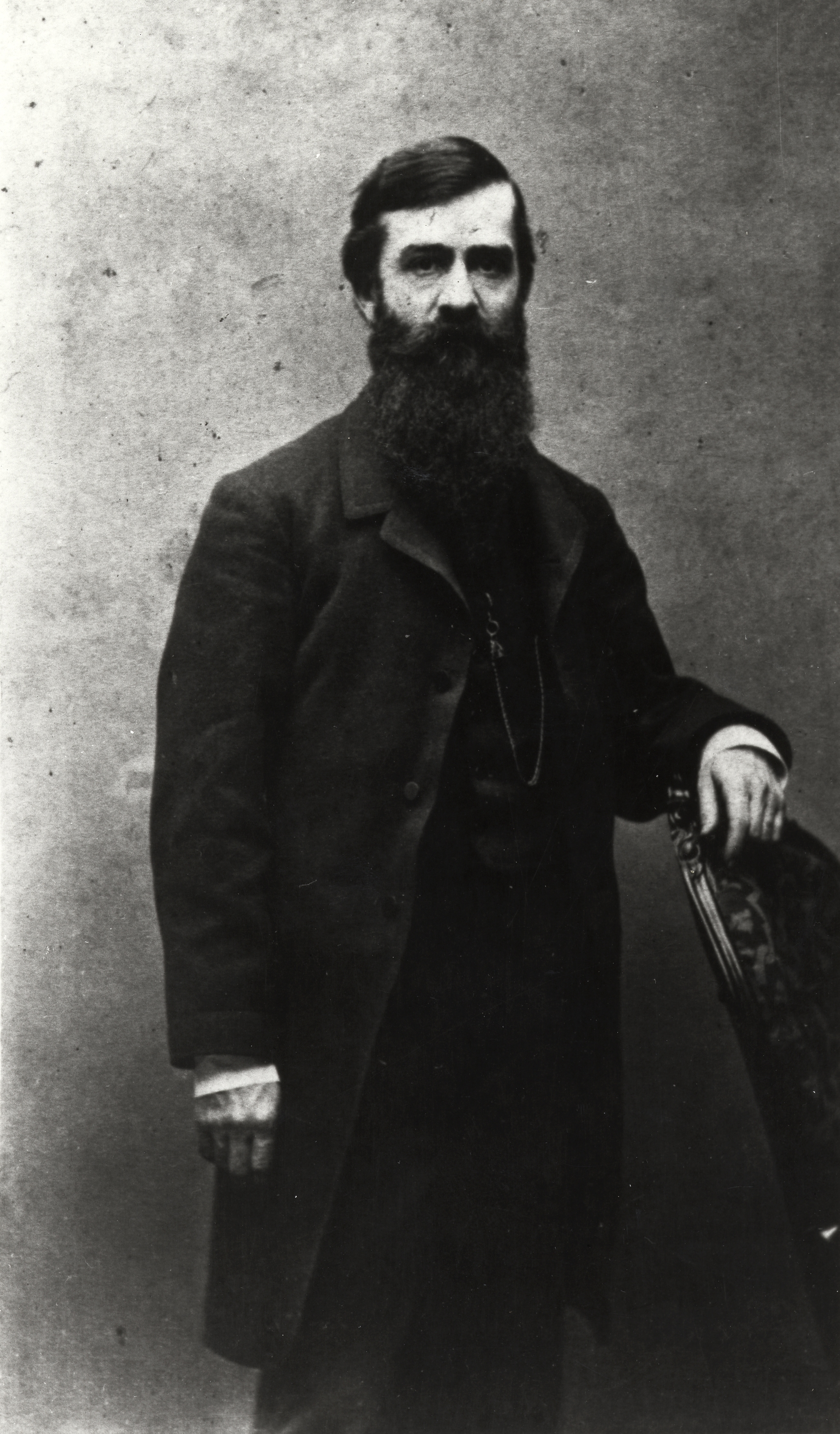
- Born: July 14, 1828; Rondout, New York
- Died: January 27, 1891 (aged 62); Rondout, New York
- Known for: Painting
- Movement: Hudson River School

Jervis McEntee (July 14, 1828 – January 27, 1891) was an American painter of the Hudson River School. He is a lesser-known figure of the 19th-century American art world, but was a close friend and traveling companion of several of the important Hudson River School artists. Aside from his paintings, McEntee's unpublished journals, written from 1872 to 1890, are an enduring legacy, documenting the life of a New York painter during and after the Gilded Age.

== Biography ==
McEntee was born in Rondout, New York on July 14, 1828, the son of James Smith McEntee (1800–1887), a civil engineer, and his wife Sarah Jane McEntee (1805–1883). His sister Mary was the wife of architect and co-designer of New York's Central Park Calvert Vaux. Otherwise, little is known of his childhood. From approximately 1844 to 1846, he attended the Clinton Liberal Institute in Clinton, New York.

He exhibited his first painting as a self-taught artist at the National Academy of Design in New York City in 1850. In the fall of that year he apprenticed with Frederic Edwin Church, then regarded as a rising star in the American art world. He left Church's studio in 1851, and while he never achieved Church's level of fame and fortune, they remained lifelong friends. After studying with Church, McEntee attempted a career as a businessman in Rondout, but did not experience much success. After three years he gave up business and devoted himself wholly to his art, becoming one of the charter residents of Richard Morris Hunt's Tenth Street Studio Building in 1857. Since many of the building's other occupants were bachelors or commuters, McEntee and his wife (who was known as a lively, sympathetic hostess) became the center of a spontaneous salon frequented by some of the best-known artists, writers, and actors of the era. After his wife died in 1878, McEntee stayed on at the building, an increasingly lonely widower, until his death in 1891.

McEntee was a particularly close friend of Hudson River School artists Sanford Robinson Gifford, Worthington Whittredge, John Ferguson Weir, as well as figurative painter Eastman Johnson. He was made an associate of the National Academy of Design in 1860, and a full academician in 1861. In 1869 he visited Europe, painting much in Italy. He died of Bright's disease at his home in Rondout on January 27, 1891, and is buried in Montrepose Cemetery in Kingston, New York.

== Artistic style ==
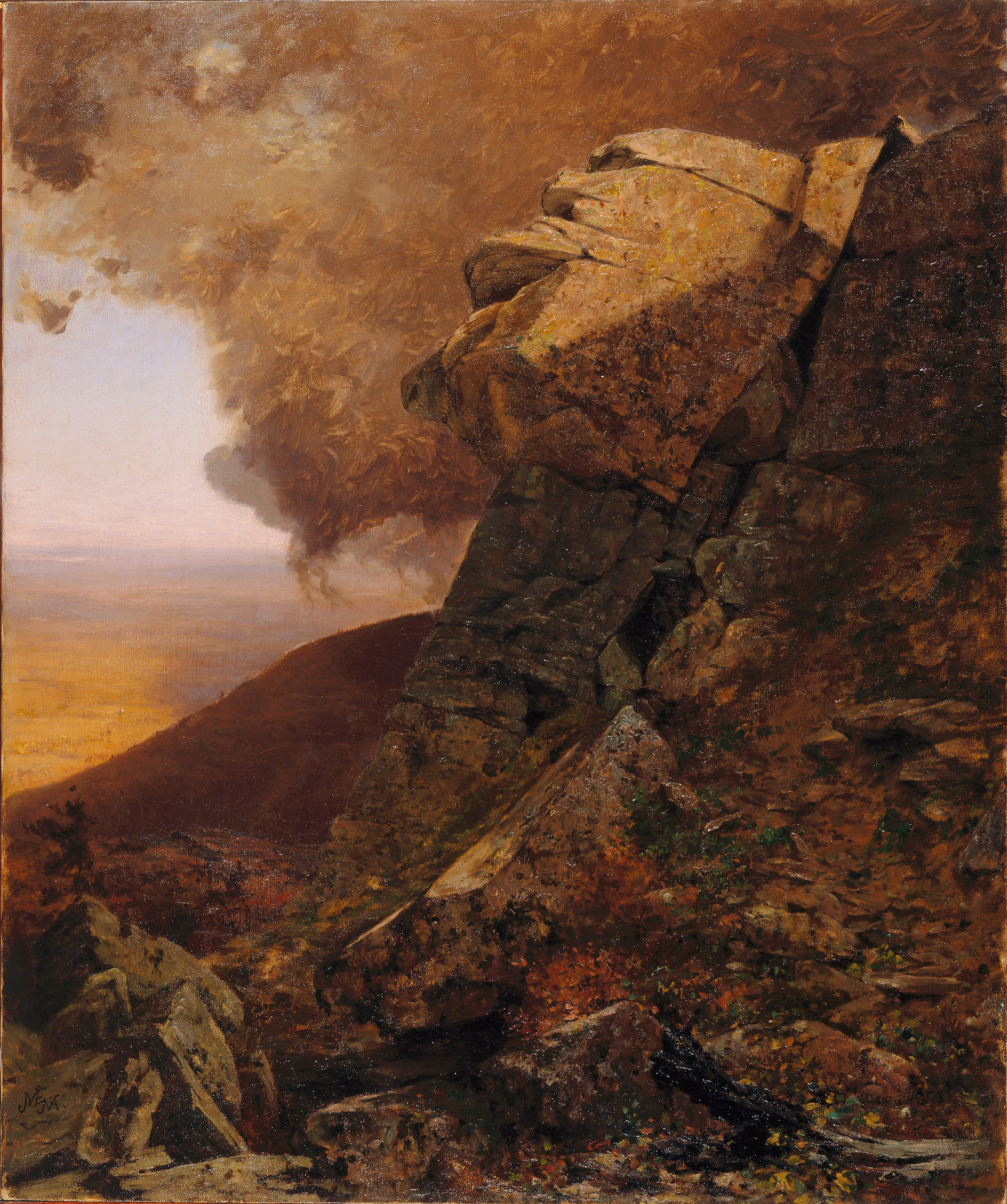
A Cliff in the Katskills, c. 1885, in the Brooklyn Museum

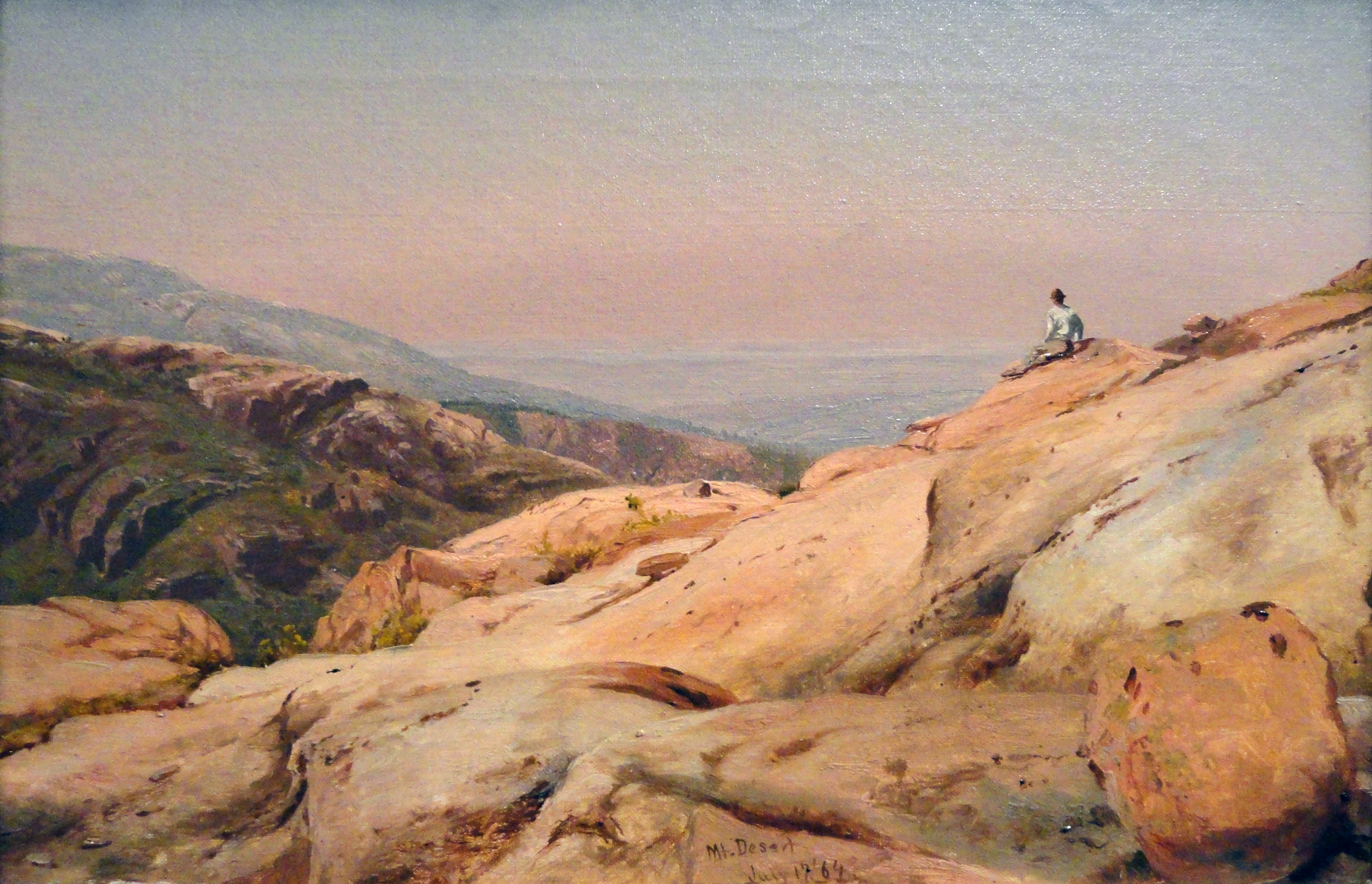
Mount Desert Island, Maine, by Jervis McEntee, 1864, in the National Gallery of Art, Washington, D.C.

The landscapes of Jervis McEntee are known for their melancholy and poetic mood. The sky is often cloudy in a McEntee landscape, the season autumn. While Jasper Francis Cropsey and other artists typically painted bright fall foliage, McEntee often captured the season near its end, with the leaves faded and falling from the trees.

"Some people call my landscapes gloomy and disagreeable," McEntee wrote in his journal. "They say I paint the sorrowful side of nature …But this is a mistake…Nature is not sad to me but quiet, pensive, restful."

== Journals ==
Aside from his paintings, McEntee's enduring legacy are the detailed journals he kept from the early 1870s until his death. These diaries provide a vivid, accurate impression of the life of a typical New York painter during and after the Gilded Age. In his writings, McEntee records a detailed account of Hudson River School artists, their day-to-day life, gossip and personal reflections, and the overall arc of the American art world in the second half of the 19th century. He discusses his artistic successes and trials, particularly as money becomes more scarce with the decline in popularity of Hudson River School art.

The journals contain first-hand information on the inner workings of the National Academy and the Century Club, on the 1876 Centennial Exposition in Philadelphia, efforts to revive the American Art-Union, and on the vigorous growth of art societies and exhibitions throughout the country. The diaries also reveal the economy of art during the period, including the prices, patterns of collecting and patronage, the artists' dependence on personal contacts through clubs, social gatherings, and influential friends. Long passages describe McEntee's overwhelming anxieties over money and family difficulties; he is frequently lonely and depressed, and always worried about his status as an artist.

McEntee's journals are now kept by the Archives of American Art, a research center within the Smithsonian Institution. Five volumes of these diaries, from 1872 to 1890, have been digitally scanned, transcribed, and can be browsed in their entirety online. In addition, the Archives holds McEntee's personal papers, which were digitized in 2007.

== Selected works ==
- The Doge's Palace (Venice), undated, St. Johnsbury Athenaeum
- The Melancholy Days Have Come (1861), National Academy of Design
- Indian Summer (ca. 1861), Detroit Institute of Arts
- Evening Landscape, Late Autumn (1861), Bowdoin College Museum of Art
- Mount Desert Island, Maine (1864), John Wilmerding Collection, National Gallery of Art
- October Snow (1870)
- The Woods of Asshockan, Catskills (1871), St. Johnsbury Athenaeum
- Sea from Shore (1873), Mead Art Museum
- Cape Ann (1874)
- A Song of Summer (1876)
- Winter in the Mountains (1878)
- Clouds (1870), Frances Lehman Loeb Art Center
- The Edge of a Wood (1880)
- Kaatskill River (1881)
- An Autumn Memory (1883), Worcester Art Museum
- Shadows of Autumn (1884)
- The Kaatskills in Winter (1884)
- A Cliff in the Katskills (c. 1885), Brooklyn Museum
- Christmas Eve (1885)
- Shadows of Autumn (1886)

== See also ==
- List of Hudson River School artists
