= Standard (Italian automobile) =

The Standard was an Italian automobile manufactured from 1906 until 1908 by the Fabbrica Automobili Standard of Torino. The company produced a 10/14 hp four-cylinder which was sometimes marketed under the name FAS.

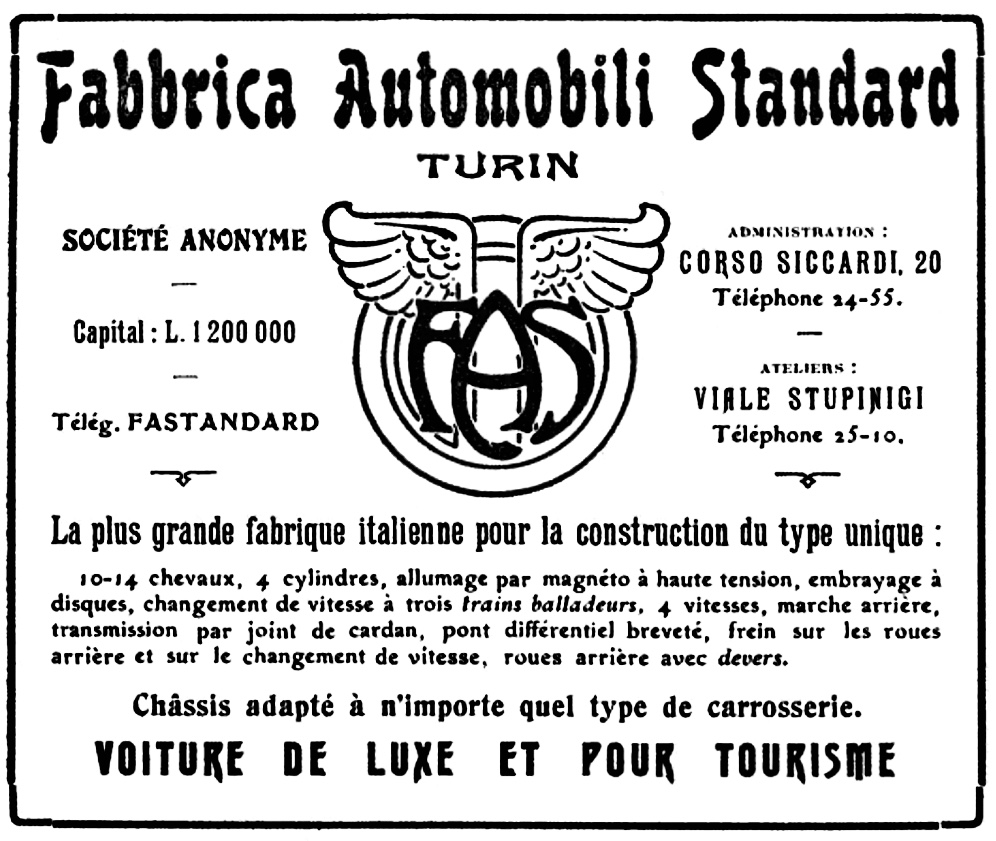
Fabbrica Automobili Standard (1907)
