= Standard (1911 automobile) =

The Standard was a German automobile manufactured between 1911 and 1912. The car was produced at Berlin-Charlottenburg using a rotary valve engine built by Henriod, which was unreliable and had not been fully developed; consequently, it was very unpopular.
