= Thomas Jefferson Sawyer =

American Universalist minister and educator

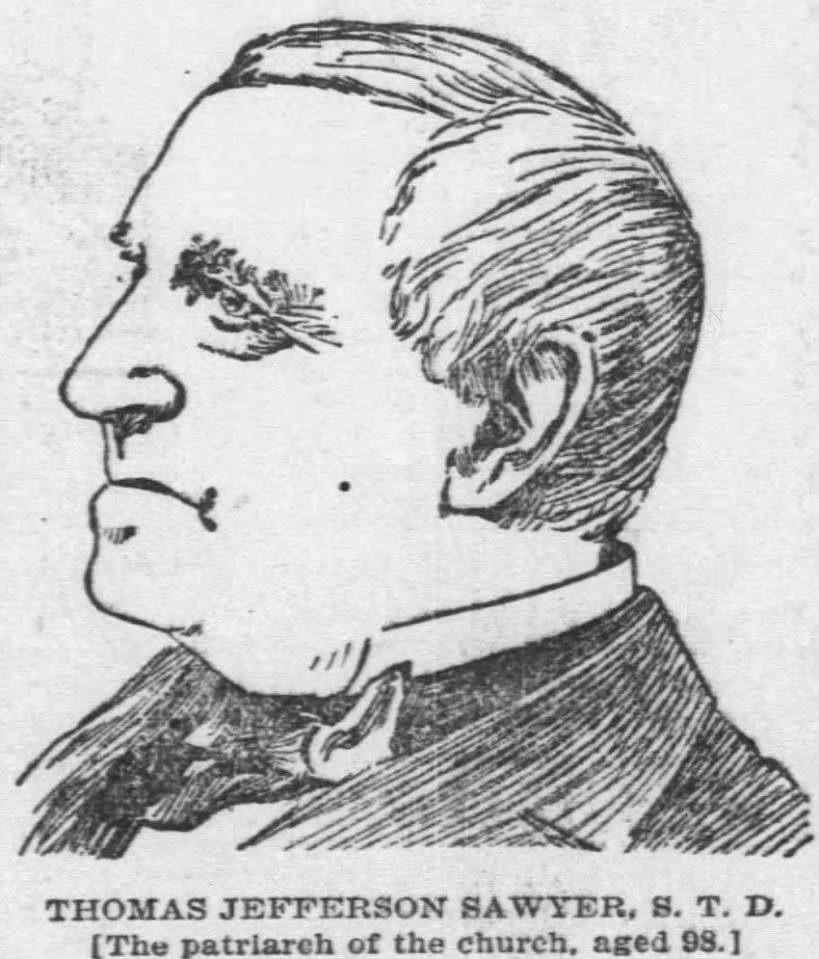
- Sketch of Sawyer in an 1897 edition of the Chicago Tribune

Personal life
- Born: January 9, 1804 Reading, Vermont, USA
- Died: July 24, 1899 (aged 95)
- Spouse: Caroline M. Fisher
- Children: 3+
- Education: Middlebury College

Religious life
- Religion: Christianity
- Denomination: Unitarian Universalism
- Profession: Minister, professor, newspaper editor

Thomas Jefferson Sawyer S.T.D. LL.D. (January 9, 1804, Reading - July 24, 1899) was an American Universalist minister and educator.

== Early life and education ==
Sawyer was born at Reading, Windsor County, Vermont, on January 9, 1804. He attended the district school and then a private school kept by a Universalist minister. At 19 he went to Chester Academy, and two years later, he enrolled at Middlebury College, from which he graduated in 1829. He received both a B.A. and M.A. from Middlebury.

== Career ==
He then prepared for a ministerial career and, in 1830, took charge of what would become the Orchard Street Universalist Church, a small congregation then located on Grand Street in New York City. He married there Caroline M. Fisher, and they had three children that reached adulthood.

In 1831 he became editor of the Christian Messenger. In 1832, he and his parishioners leased a former Dutch Reformed Society building on Orchard Street, and he preached there until 1845, when he resigned to become Principal of the Clinton Liberal Institute in Clinton, Oneida County, New York. He remained there until 1852. Among his students there was Charles H. Leonard, who became an influential Unitarian minister and educator. Sawyer was instrumental in organizing the Universalist Historical Society, whose Secretary and Librarian he remained in 1896.

In taking charge of the Institute at Clinton, Mr. Sawyer also became minister of Clinton's Universalist church. In 1847 he issued the call for the convention held in New York City, the outcome of which was the founding of Tufts College, Canton Theological School, and St. Lawrence University. Mr. Sawyer was president of the first board of trustees of each of these. He was offered the Presidency of Tufts College but declined it in a dispute over salary.

In 1852 he returned to his pastorate in New York City, where he remained until 1861. After two years in Clinton, he returned to New York as Editor of the Christian Ambassador. He held this position for three years, then spent three years on a farm in Carteret, New Jersey.

When Tufts Divinity School opened in 1869, he was called to take charge of it as Pacard Professor of Theology, its first professor. In 1882 he was formally made Dean. In 1884 his impaired eyesight made him withdraw from active teaching. In 1892 he was made Emeritus. He was succeeded in that office by his former student, Leonard. Sawyer died on July 24, 1899.

== Honors ==
Harvard University awarded him the Doctor of Sacred Theology in 1850, and Tufts made him Doctor of Laws in 1895. Twice he has been elected President of Tufts University, once of Canton Theological School, and once of Lombard University, but all of these he declined.

According to Rev. Richard Eddy, in dedicating to Sawyer the second volume of his history of Universalism in America, "his influence in shaping the thought of the Universalist Church far exceeds that of any other living man." He was called "one of the most prominent figures in the Universalist Church for over 60 years."
