= Standard Six =

Defunct American motor vehicle manufacturer

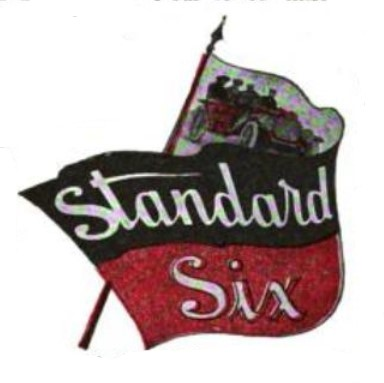
- 1906 Standard Six emblem from advertisement

Overview
- Type: Touring car
- Manufacturer: St. Louis Car Company
- Production: 1909–1911
- Assembly: United States
- Designer: George J. Kobusch

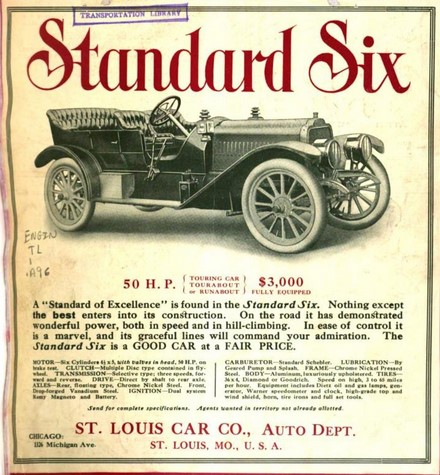
1909 Standard Six advertisement on the cover of The Automobile

The Standard Six was an American automobile manufactured in St. Louis, Missouri by the St. Louis Car Company from 1909 until 1910. The company initially built the French Mors cars under license as the American Mors from 1906 to 1909. In 1910, Standard Six manufacturing was moved to Wabash, Indiana where production ended in 1911.

== History ==
The St. Louis Car Company, better known for their railway cars, built the American Mors car from 1906 to 1909. In August 1909 the St. Louis Car Company announced it would manufacture its own six-cylinder automobile of American design. George J. Kobusch who oversaw American Mors manufacturing remained in charge of the factory producing the new Standard Six.

The Standard Six was a 50-hp car on a 124-inch wheelbase chassis with a three-speed transmission and shaft-drive. Pricing was $3,000 (equivalent to $103,661 in 2025) for a touring car, miniature tonneau or roadster, with a limousine selling for $4,000.

In February 1910 manufacture of the Standard Six was moved to a subsidiary plant in Wabash, Indiana. Financial difficulties were encountered in Indiana, and production was discontinued later in 1910. In February 1911 John I. Beggs replaced George Kobush and production was reinstated, but for a short time only.

St. Louis Car Company left the automotive industry for a decade until they tried again with the Skelton automobile.

Advertisements

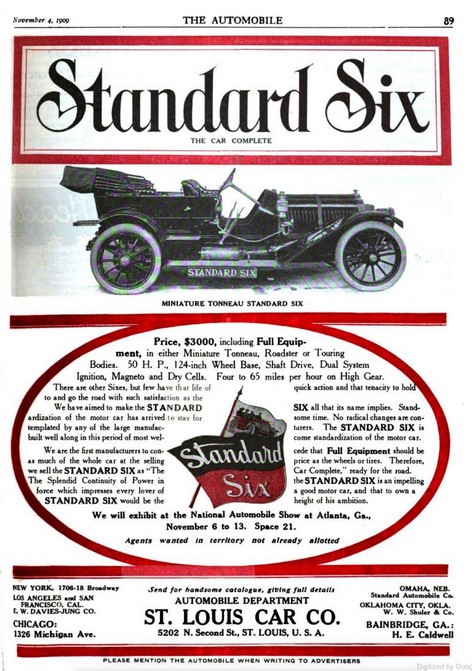
1909 Standard Six color advertisement in The Automobile

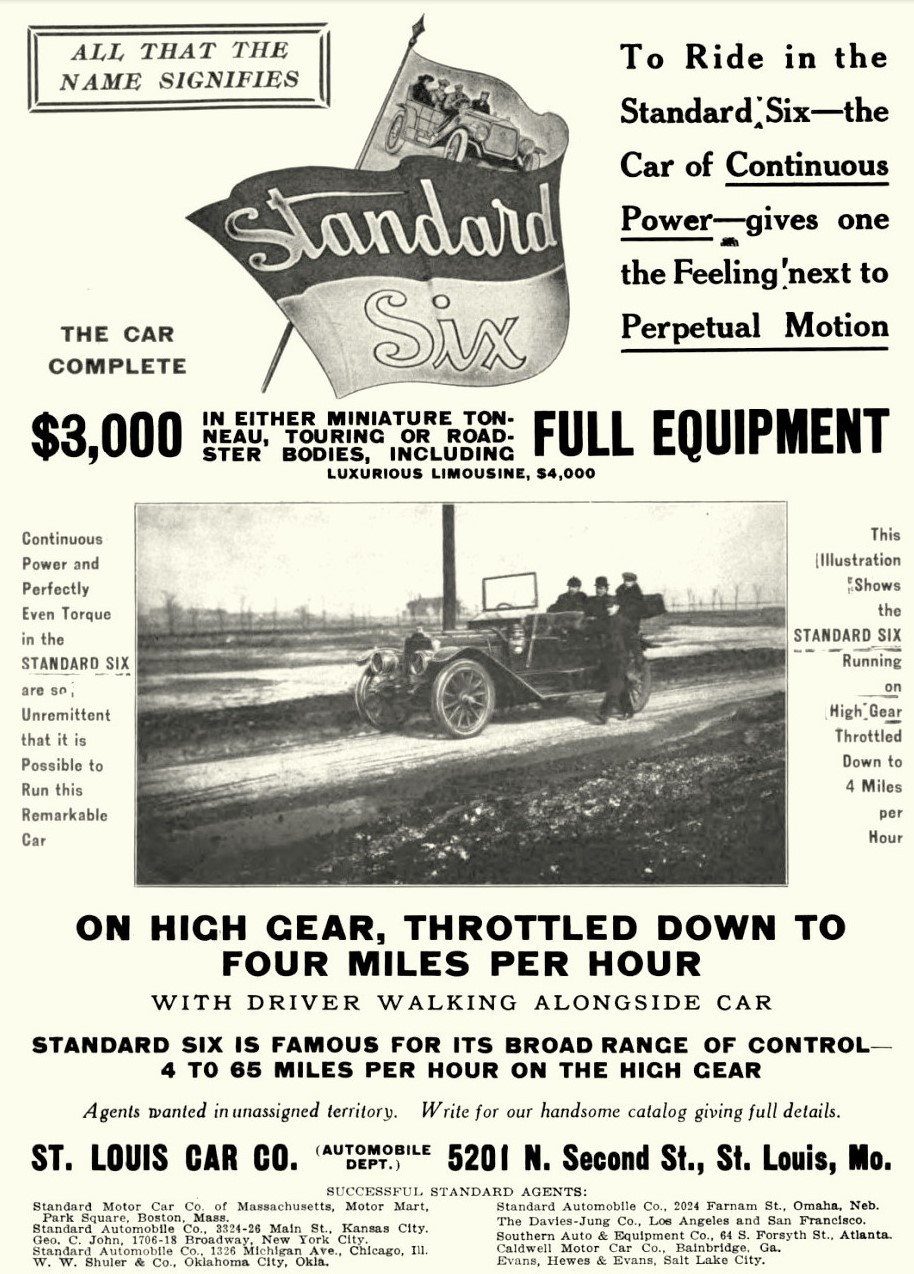
1910 Standard Six advertisement in Cycle and Automobile Trade Journal
