= Industry standard =

An industry standard is a technical standard used in technical contexts throughout an industry. It may also refer to:

- Industry Standard Architecture, the 16-bit internal bus of IBM Personal Computer/AT
- Industry Standard Coding Identification, a standard created to identify commercials that aired on U.S. TV
- The Industry Standard, a news website and former magazine

== Music ==
- Industry Standard, a 1982 album by the Dregs
- Industry Standard, a UK garage duo (Clayton Mitchell and Dave Deller) known for the 1997 song "Vol. 1 (What You Want What You Need)"
- Industry Standard, an alias used by Orbital in 1992 for the single "Rave On"; after this, Orbital would go on to use the phrase "industry standard" to mean a radio edit of a song

== See also ==
- Standard (disambiguation)
