= Standard (1904 automobile) =

Defunct American motor vehicle manufacturer

Standard Motor Construction Company (1904–1905) was the successor to the U. S. Long Distance Automobile Company (1900–1903) of Jersey City, New Jersey. The American Veteran Era Long Distance automobile was developed into the Standard automobile in 1904.

== U. S. Long Distance Automobile Company ==
U. S. Long Distance Automobile Company
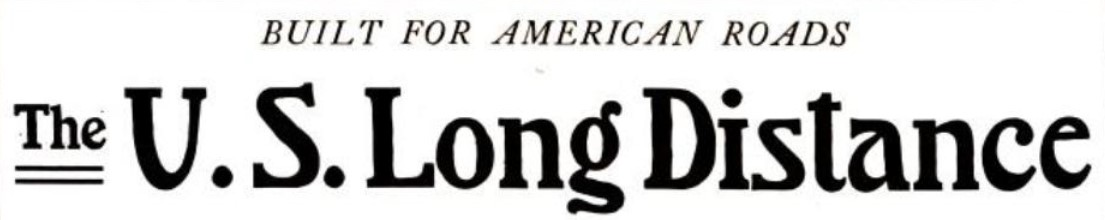
- Logo from advertisement

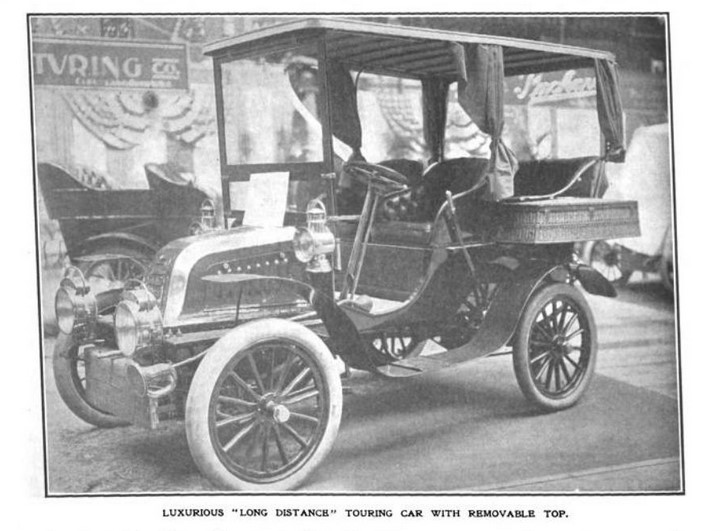
- U S Long Distance Touring Car from New York Motor Show in The Automobile magazine
- Industry: Automotive
- Founded: 1900; 126 years ago
- Defunct: 1904; 122 years ago
- Fate: Reorganized
- Successor: Standard Motor Construction Company
- Headquarters: Jersey City, New Jersey, United States
- Key people: Lt. John C. Fremont, D. J. Newland, Lewis Nixon, C. C. Riotte
- Products: Automobiles
- Production output: unknown (1901-1903)

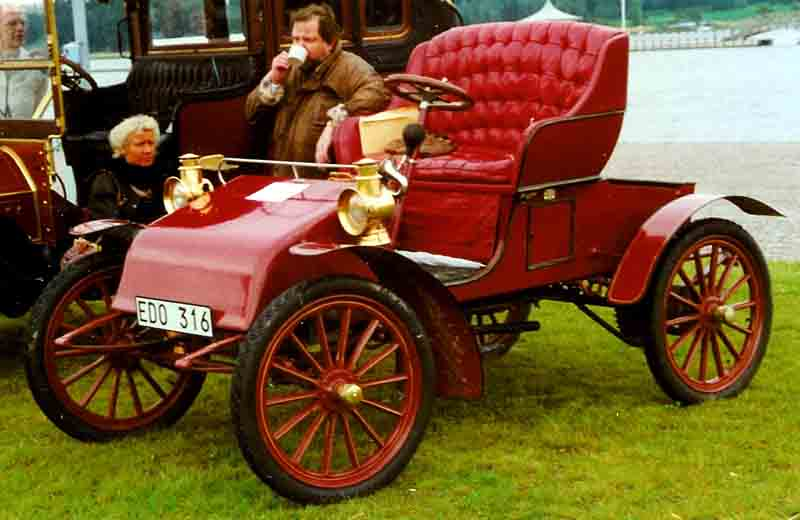
1903 Long Distance 7-hp Runabout

Lt. John C. Fremont, D. J. Newland and Lewis Nixon founded the U. S. Long Distance Automobile Company in 1900 to manufacture gasoline marine engines and automobiles. A plant in Jersey City, New Jersey first produced gasoline marine engines followed by gasoline automobiles in 1901. C. C. Riotte who had previously designed marine engines, designed the Long Distance and superintended manufacturing.

From 1901 to 1903, five models were offered. All engines were water-cooled, with a planetary transmission with two or three gears and chain drive. Steering wheels replaced tiller steering in late 1902.

- The Type A had a single-cylinder engine with 7-hp . The chassis had a wheelbase of 74-inches with a runabout body priced at $1,000, equivalent to $37,212 in 2025.
- The Type B had a two-cylinder engine with 10-hp. The wheelbase was 80-inches with a tonneau body priced at $1,500.
- The Type C had a slightly more powerful two-cylinder engine with 12-hp, the same wheelbase and a tonneau body priced at $2,500, equivalent to $93,029 in 2025.
- The Type D was the top model with a three-cylinder engine produced 20-hp. Wheelbase and body were the same as Type B and was priced at $4,000.
- The Type E was a Type B as a delivery van priced at $2,000.
Advertisements

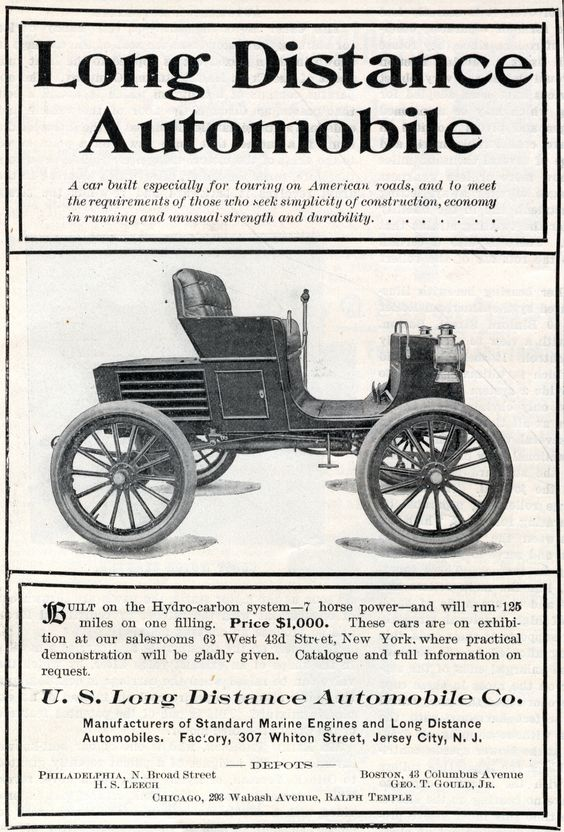
1902 Long Distance Type A runabout in The Automobile

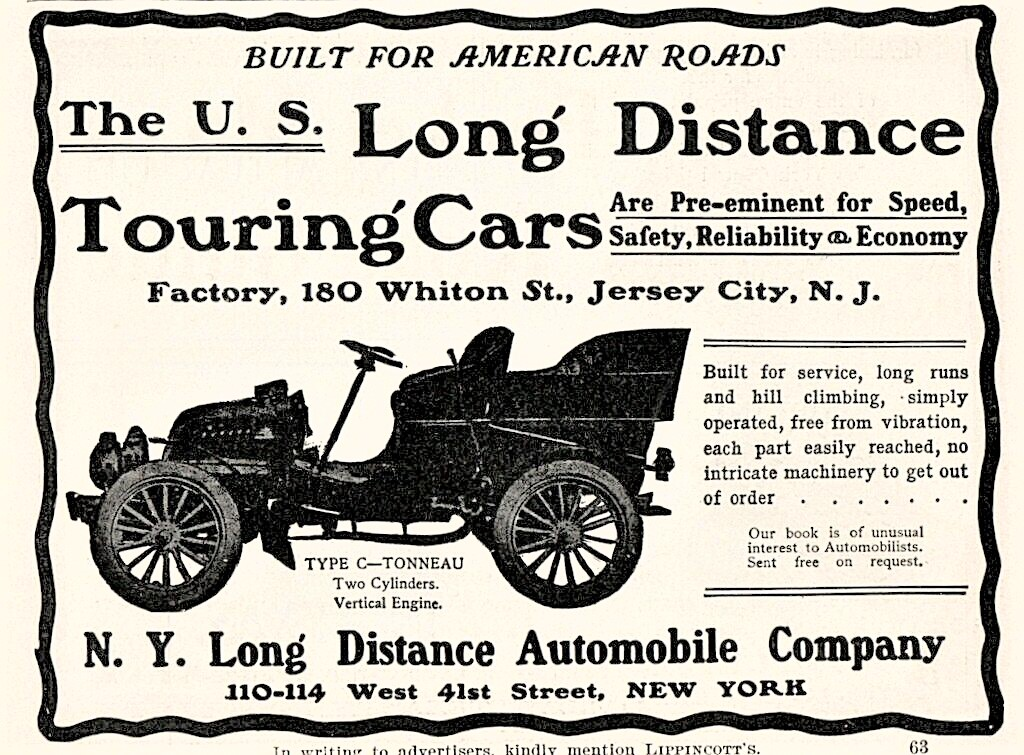
1903 Long Distance Type C Tonneau - Lippincotts Magazine

Production plans were for ten to twelve vehicles a week. The company acquired a Selden patent license. In January 1904, U. S. Long Distance was reorganized as the Standard Motor Construction Company, with the factory at the same 307 Whiton Street address in Jersey City.

== Standard Motor Construction Company ==
Standard Motor Construction Company
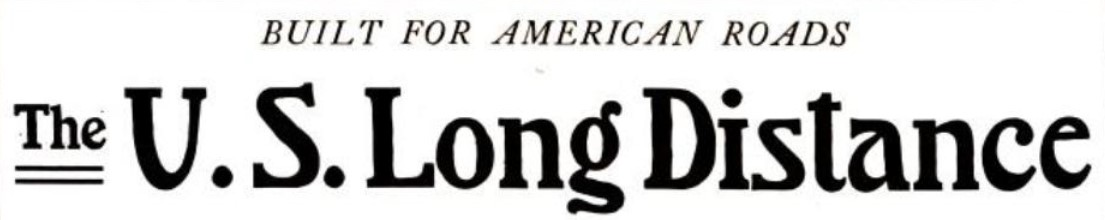
- Formerly: U. S. Long Distance Automobile Company
- Industry: Automotive
- Founded: 1904; 122 years ago
- Defunct: 1905; 121 years ago
- Headquarters: Jersey City, New Jersey, United States
- Key people: C. C. Riotte
- Products: Automobiles
- Production output: unknown (1904-1905)

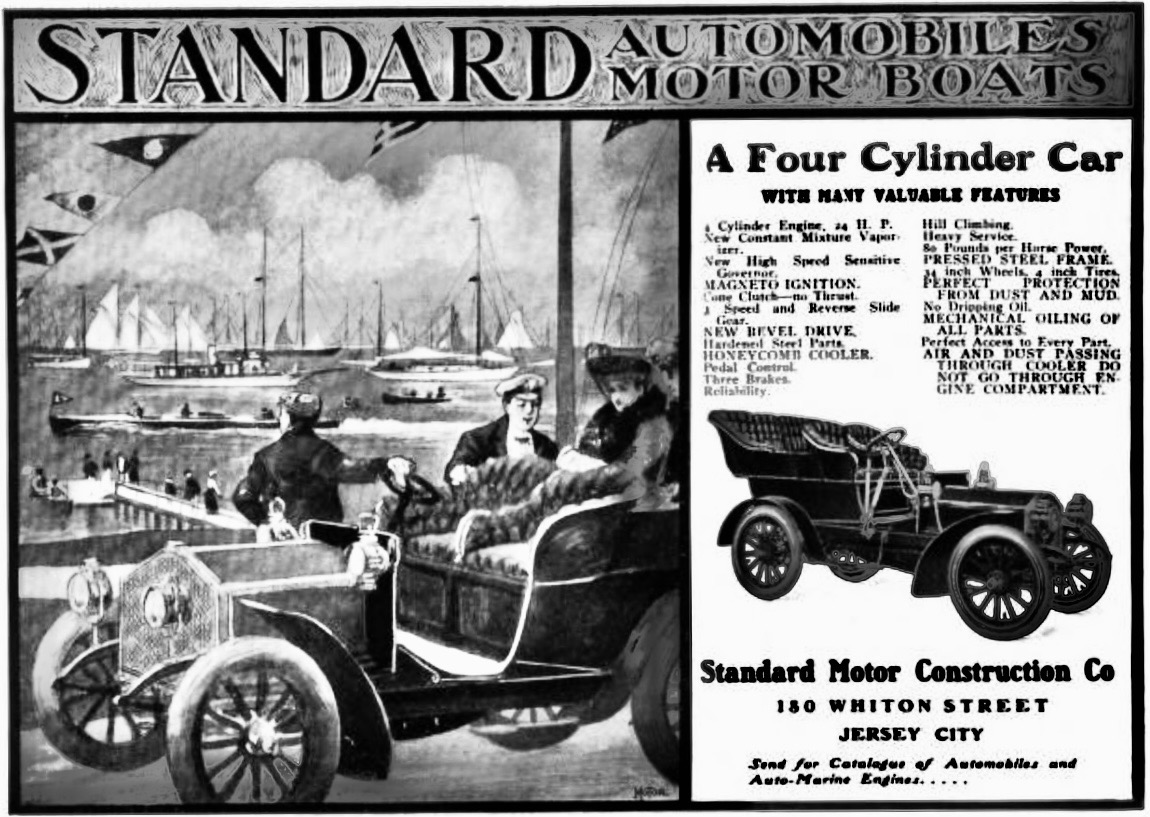
Standard Motor Construction Company 24 hp (1904)

Standard Motor Construction Company was founded in January 1904 in Jersey City, New Jersey to succeed the U. S. Long Distance Automobile Company. C. C. Riotte designed larger luxury cars to succeed the Long Distance. The brand name was Standard but for the first year it was advertised as the Standard Tourist U S Long Distance.

Standard vehicles had four-cylinder 25-hp engines, with a three-speed gearbox and a chain-drive. In 1904 the Tourist model was on a 95-inch wheelbase with a side-entrance touring body, luxury priced at $3,000, equivalent to $107,500 in 2025. For 1905, the wheelbase was extended to 109-inches with the touring car now priced at $3,500. A landaulet was offered for $3,900, equivalent to $139,750 in 2025.

The company elected to close down and automobile production ended in the summer of 1905. Edward Ringwood Hewitt acquired the company's Selden license for his Hewitt Motor Company which was formed in 1906.

Models

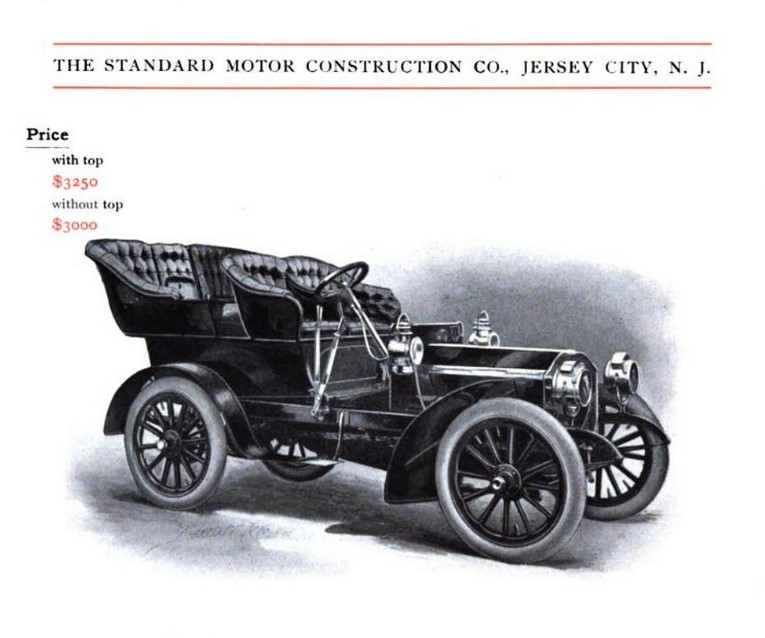
1904 Standard from the Official Handbook of Automobiles

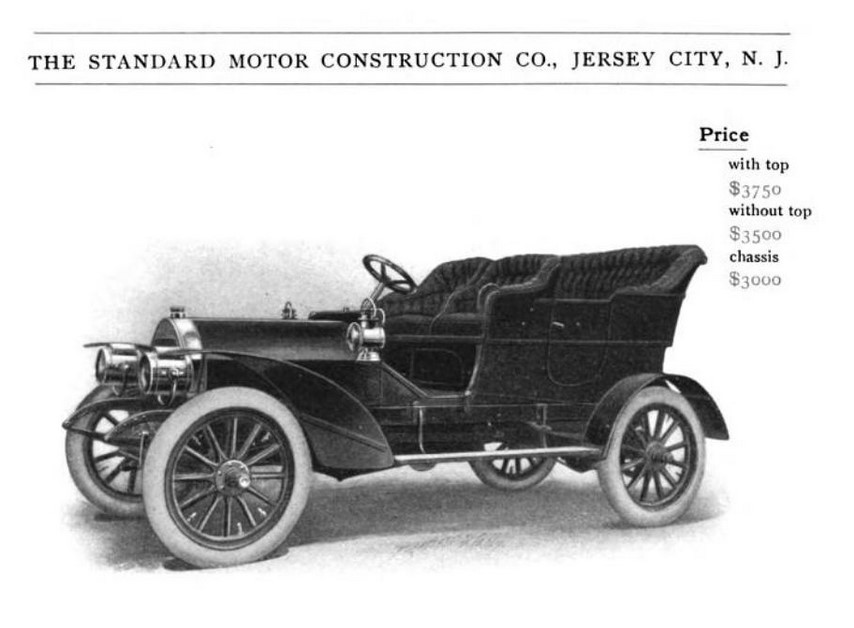
1905 Standard from the Official Handbook of Automobiles
