= Joseph G. Standart =

Hardware businessman in Detroit

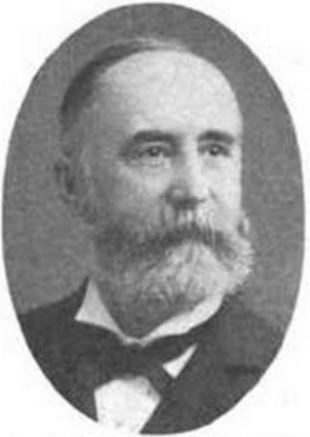
Joseph G. Standart.

Joseph Gardner Standart (July 17, 1834 – June 1912) was a Detroit hardware businessman. His career in hardware lasted more than 50 years, and he was described as "a leading and influential citizen of Detroit".

== Early life and family ==
Born on July 17, 1834, in Monroeville, Ohio, to Henry Winslow and Ann (Gardner) Standart, Standart was educated in the public schools of Auburn, New York, and later attended the Clinton Liberal Institute at Clinton, New York. Standart had multiple siblings, including his brother George G. Standart. Standart's father was involved in the hardware business until his death in 1872.

After moving to Detroit, in 1855, Standart married Mary Champion Miller, the daughter of a general, on December 22, 1858. Their family home was located at No. 83 Edmund Place, Detroit.

== Career ==
Standart entered the hardware business in 1850 at the age of 16 when he took a job at a retail hardware store in Auburn, working for a salary of $50 a year. Two years later he moved to Cleveland, where he entered the employ of hardware distributor George Worthington & Company.

He arrived in Detroit in September 1855, and worked under the city's leading hardware firm Buhle & DuCharmne until 1863. In 1864, Standart and his brother George founded their own hardware business known as Standart Brothers. The store sold wholesale hardware, as well as cutlery and sporting goods. In 1900, the business was incorporated under the title of Standart Brothers, Limited, and Standart became chairman.

Standart's business activities were characterized by writers as "cooperation in public interests" and "zealous support of [what] he believes will contribute to the material, social or moral improvement of the community". Outside of his hardware business, Standart was a long-time member of the Masonic order, a member of the Detroit Board of Commerce, a veteran of the Detroit Light Guard, and a stalwart supporter of the Republican party and the Protestant Episcopal church.

By the end of his career, Standart was one of the "best known and most highly respected" businessesmen in Detroit. He died of meningitis in June 1912, following three months of illness and an operation. He was interred in Detroit's Elmwood Cemetery.
