= The Standard (Zimbabwe) =

Zimbabwe newspaper

- Type: Weekly newspaper
- Owner: Alpha Media Holdings
- Founded: 1997; 29 years ago
- Circulation: 117,000 (2003)
- Website: www.thestandard.co.zw

The Standard is a weekly Sunday newspaper in Zimbabwe. It is part of the AMH group, along with The Zimbabwe Independent and NewsDay.

== Contributors ==
- Kudzai Mutisi
- Kumbirai Thierry Nhamo
- Tendai Ruben Mbofana
