= NewsDay (Zimbabwean newspaper) =

Zimbabwe newspaper published since 2010

- NewsDay cover (20 April 2020)
- Type: Daily newspaper
- Format: Tabloid
- Publisher: Associated Newspapers Group
- Editor: Barnabas Thondlana
- Founded: 2010; 15 years ago
- Language: English
- Website: http://www.newsday.co.zw/

NewsDay is a Harare-based Zimbabwean independent daily newspaper published since 2010. It began publishing on 4 June 2010 and is based in Harare. It carries the slogan "Everyday News for Everyday People" on its logo.

== Living contributors ==
- Tendai Ruben Mbofana
- Kumbirai Thierry Nhamo
- Kudzai Mutisi

== See also ==
- Media of Zimbabwe
