= UniKey (software) =

Vietnamese keyboarding software

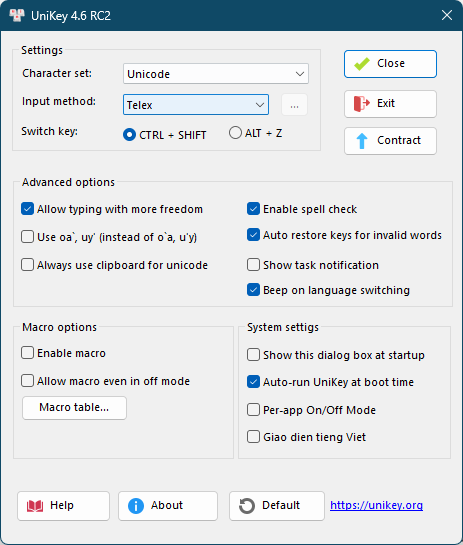
- UniKey 4.6 RC2 settings dialog on Windows 11
- Developer: Phạm Kim Long
- Initial release: 2000; 25 years ago
- Stable release: 4.6 RC2 / 19 September 2023; 2 years ago
- Written in: C++
- Operating system: Microsoft Windows, Linux, MacOS
- Available in: English and Vietnamese
- Type: Input method editor
- License: GNU GPL v3
- Website: www.unikey.org

UniKey is an input method editor (IME) for Vietnamese text. The core engine, the UniKey Vietnamese Input Method, is also the engine embedded in many Vietnamese software-based keyboards in Microsoft Windows, Android, Linux, macOS and iOS. UniKey is free and open source, and the source code for the UniKey Vietnamese Input Method is distributed under GNU General Public License.

== Overview ==
UniKey supports a variety of Vietnamese character encodings, including UTF-8, TCVN3 (ABC), VIQR, VNI, VPS, VISCII, BK HCM1, and BK HCM2, as well as Unicode-based decimal and hexadecimal NCRs for web editors. Text may be input using TELEX, VNI, or VIQR. UniKey is minimalist and does not require additional libraries, allowing it to support Windows releases as far back as 9x.

== About UniKey ==
UniKey was developed by Phạm Kim Long beginning in 1994, while he was a student at the Hanoi University of Science and Technology, and privately distributed among his friends under the names TVNBK and LittleVnKey, before being released publicly for Microsoft Windows in 2000. It gained popularity for encoding Vietnamese thanks to its speed, simplicity, and reliability, eventually becoming the most popular Windows-based Vietnamese IME.

The core engine, the UniKey Vietnamese Input Method, is open source and was first released as a part of the X-Unikey Vietnamese keyboard for Linux in 2001. Since then, the engine has been integrated into the input methods in different operating systems and software frameworks. ibus-unikey, developed by Lê Quốc Tuấn using the UniKey engine, is widely used for Linux distributions.

From Mac OS X Leopard onwards, released in 2007, Apple has integrated the UniKey Vietnamese Input Method into the built-in Vietnamese input of macOS. Beginning with iOS 4.0 in 2010, the engine has also been integrated to the built-in Vietnamese keyboard in iOS.
