= Vietnamese language and computers =

The Vietnamese language is written with a Latin script with diacritics (accent tones) which requires several accommodations when typing on phone or computers. Software-based systems are a form of writing Vietnamese on phones or computers with software that can be installed on the device or from third-party software such as UniKey. Telex is the oldest input method devised to encode the Vietnamese language with its tones. Other input methods may also include VNI (Number key-based keyboard) and VIQR. VNI input method is not to be confused with VNI code page.

Historically, Vietnamese was also written in chữ Nôm, which is mainly used for ceremonial and traditional purposes in recent times, and remains in the field of historians and philologists. There have been attempts to type chữ Hán and chữ Nôm with existing Vietnamese input methods, but they are not widespread. Sometimes, Vietnamese can be typed without tone marks, which Vietnamese speakers can usually guess depending on context.

== Fonts and character encodings ==
=== Vietnamese alphabet ===
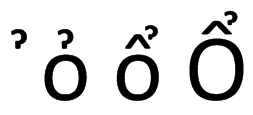
It is common for two diacritics to be placed on a single Vietnamese vowel. Some fonts (like Arial, Times New Roman,..) stack these diacritics, while others (like Calibri, Courier New,...) offset the tone mark to the left or the right.

==== Character encodings ====
There are as many as 46 character encodings for representing the Vietnamese alphabet. Unicode has become the most popular form for many of the world's writing systems, due to its great compatibility and software support. Diacritics may be encoded either as combining characters or as precomposed characters, which are scattered throughout the Latin-1 Supplement, Latin Extended-A, Latin Extended-B, and Latin Extended Additional blocks. The Vietnamese đồng symbol is encoded in the Currency Symbols block.

Unicode's coverage of Vietnamese has been subject to several changes since the 1990s. Early versions of Unicode encoded dấu huyền and dấu sắc as U+0340 ◌̀ COMBINING GRAVE TONE MARK and U+0341 ◌́ COMBINING ACUTE TONE MARK, respectively. In 2001, these two characters were deprecated as duplicate encodings of U+0300 ◌̀ COMBINING GRAVE ACCENT and U+0301 ◌́ COMBINING ACUTE ACCENT; this change was incorporated into Unicode 3.2, released in 2002. With the 2009 release of Unicode 5.2, U+0340 ◌̀ and U+0341 ◌́ were undeprecated but discouraged. Historically, the Vietnamese language used other characters beyond the modern alphabet. The Middle Vietnamese letter B with flourish (ꞗ) is included in the Latin Extended-D block. The apex is not separately encoded in Unicode, because it derives from the Portuguese tilde, whereas dấu ngã, which derives from the Greek perispomeni, has always been misencoded as a tilde. As a workaround, U+1DC3 ◌᷃ COMBINING SUSPENSION MARK represents the apex on Wikisource and Wiktionary.

For systems that lack support for Unicode, dozens of 8-bit Vietnamese code pages have been designed. The most commonly used of them were VISCII, VSCII (TCVN 5712:1993), VNI, VPS and Windows-1258. Where ASCII is required, such as when ensuring readability in plain text e-mail, Vietnamese letters are often encoded according to Vietnamese Quoted-Readable (VIQR) or VSCII Mnemonic (VSCII-MNEM), though usage of either variable-width scheme has declined dramatically following the adoption of Unicode on the World Wide Web. For instance, support for all above mentioned 8-bit encodings, with the exception of Windows-1258, was dropped from Mozilla software in 2014.

Many Vietnamese fonts intended for desktop publishing are encoded in VNI or TCVN3 (VSCII). Such fonts are known as "ABC fonts". Popular web browsers lack support for specialty Vietnamese encodings, so any webpage that uses these fonts appears as unintelligible mojibake on systems without them installed.

At right, an í that retains its tittle

Vietnamese often stacks diacritics, so typeface designers must take care to prevent stacked diacritics from colliding with adjacent letters or lines. When a tone mark is used together with another diacritic, offsetting the tone mark to the right preserves consistency and avoids slowing down saccades. In advertising signage and in cursive handwriting, diacritics often take forms unfamiliar to other Latin alphabets. For example, the lowercase letter I retains its tittle in ì, ỉ, ĩ, and í. These nuances are rarely accounted for in computing environments.

==== Approaches to character encoding ====
Vietnamese writing requires 134 additional letters (between both cases) besides the 52 already present in ASCII. This exceeds the 128 additional characters available in a conventional extended ASCII encoding. Although this can be solved by using a variable-width encoding (as is done by UTF-8), a number of approaches have been used by other encodings to support Vietnamese without doing so:

- Replace at least six ASCII characters, selected either for being uncommon in Vietnamese, and/or for being non-invariant in ISO 646 or DEC NRCS (as in VNI for DOS).
- Drop the uppercase letters which are least frequently used, or all uppercase letters with tone marks (as in VSCII-3 (TCVN3)). These letters may still be supplied by means of all-capital fonts.
- Drop forms of the letter Y with tone marks, necessitating use of the letter I in those circumstances. This approach was rejected by the designers of VISCII on the basis that a character encoding should not attempt to settle a spelling reform issue.
- Replace at least six C0 control characters (as in VISCII, VSCII-1 (TCVN1) and VPS).
- Use combining characters, allowing one vowel with accents to be fully represented using a sequence of characters (as in VNI, VSCII-2 (TCVN2), Windows-1258 and ANSEL).

==== Unicode code points ====
The following table provides Unicode code points for all non-ASCII Vietnamese letters.

Unmarked	Grave	Hook	Perispomeni	Acute	Dot
	̀ (U+0300)	̉ (U+0309)	̃ (U+0303)	́ (U+0301)	̣ (U+0323)
Uppercase letters
A	À (U+00C0)	Ả (U+1EA2)	Ã (U+00C3)	Á (U+00C1)	Ạ (U+1EA0)
Ă (U+0102)	Ằ (U+1EB0)	Ẳ (U+1EB2)	Ẵ (U+1EB4)	Ắ (U+1EAE)	Ặ (U+1EB6)
Â (U+00C2)	Ầ (U+1EA6)	Ẩ (U+1EA8)	Ẫ (U+1EAA)	Ấ (U+1EA4)	Ậ (U+1EAC)
Đ (U+0110)					
E	È (U+00C8)	Ẻ (U+1EBA)	Ẽ (U+1EBC)	É (U+00C9)	Ẹ (U+1EB8)
Ê (U+00CA)	Ề (U+1EC0)	Ể (U+1EC2)	Ễ (U+1EC4)	Ế (U+1EBE)	Ệ (U+1EC6)
I	Ì (U+00CC)	Ỉ (U+1EC8)	Ĩ (U+0128)	Í (U+00CD)	Ị (U+1ECA)
O	Ò (U+00D2)	Ỏ (U+1ECE)	Õ (U+00D5)	Ó (U+00D3)	Ọ (U+1ECC)
Ô (U+00D4)	Ồ (U+1ED2)	Ổ (U+1ED4)	Ỗ (U+1ED6)	Ố (U+1ED0)	Ộ (U+1ED8)
Ơ (U+01A0)	Ờ (U+1EDC)	Ở (U+1EDE)	Ỡ (U+1EE0)	Ớ (U+1EDA)	Ợ (U+1EE2)
U	Ù (U+00D9)	Ủ (U+1EE6)	Ũ (U+0168)	Ú (U+00DA)	Ụ (U+1EE4)
Ư (U+01AF)	Ừ (U+1EEA)	Ử (U+1EEC)	Ữ (U+1EEE)	Ứ (U+1EE8)	Ự (U+1EF0)
Y	Ỳ (U+1EF2)	Ỷ (U+1EF6)	Ỹ (U+1EF8)	Ý (U+00DD)	Ỵ (U+1EF4)
Lowercase letters
a	à (U+00E0)	ả (U+1EA3)	ã (U+00E3)	á (U+00E1)	ạ (U+1EA1)
ă (U+0103)	ằ (U+1EB1)	ẳ (U+1EB3)	ẵ (U+1EB5)	ắ (U+1EAF)	ặ (U+1EB7)
â (U+00E2)	ầ (U+1EA7)	ẩ (U+1EA9)	ẫ (U+1EAB)	ấ (U+1EA5)	ậ (U+1EAD)
đ (U+0111)					
e	è (U+00E8)	ẻ (U+1EBB)	ẽ (U+1EBD)	é (U+00E9)	ẹ (U+1EB9)
ê (U+00EA)	ề (U+1EC1)	ể (U+1EC3)	ễ (U+1EC5)	ế (U+1EBF)	ệ (U+1EC7)
i	ì (U+00EC)	ỉ (U+1EC9)	ĩ (U+0129)	í (U+00ED)	ị (U+1ECB)
o	ò (U+00F2)	ỏ (U+1ECF)	õ (U+00F5)	ó (U+00F3)	ọ (U+1ECD)
ô (U+00F4)	ồ (U+1ED3)	ổ (U+1ED5)	ỗ (U+1ED7)	ố (U+1ED1)	ộ (U+1ED9)
ơ (U+01A1)	ờ (U+1EDD)	ở (U+1EDF)	ỡ (U+1EE1)	ớ (U+1EDB)	ợ (U+1EE3)
u	ù (U+00F9)	ủ (U+1EE7)	ũ (U+0169)	ú (U+00FA)	ụ (U+1EE5)
ư (U+01B0)	ừ (U+1EEB)	ử (U+1EED)	ữ (U+1EEF)	ứ (U+1EE9)	ự (U+1EF1)
y	ỳ (U+1EF3)	ỷ (U+1EF7)	ỹ (U+1EF9)	ý (U+00FD)	ỵ (U+1EF5)

==== Font substitution ====
Many fonts support a subset of the Latin writing system that omits much of the Vietnamese alphabet. Due to the high density of Vietnamese-specific characters in Vietnamese text, Web browsers that implement font substitution reliably produce a ransom note effect when the webpage specifies an inadequate font.

=== Chữ Nôm ===
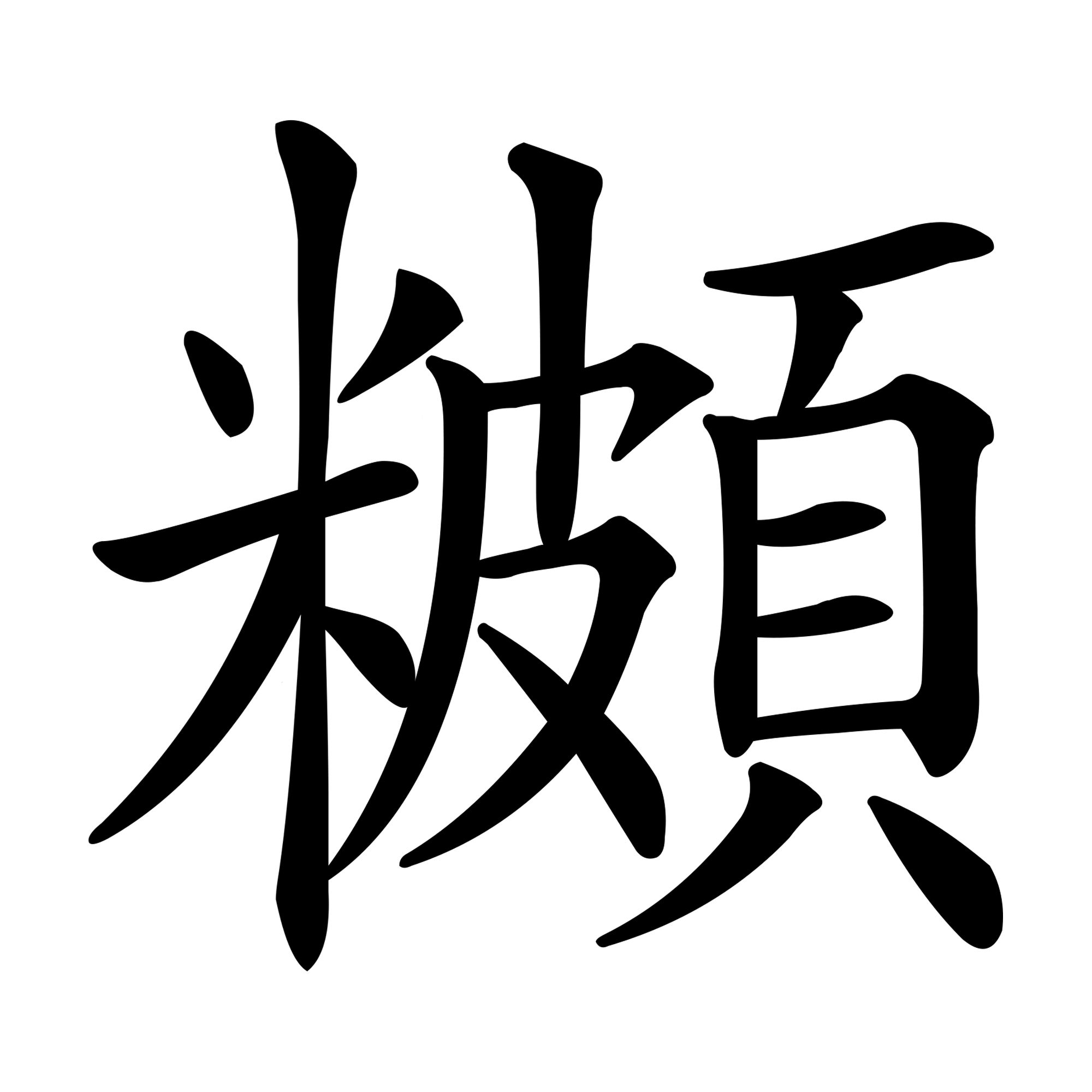
The nôm character for phở

Unicode includes over 10,000 Nôm characters as part of Unicode's repertoire of CJK Unified Ideographs. Of these characters, 10,082 can be found in the CJK Unified Ideographs Extension B block, while the rest are distributed between the CJK Unified Ideographs, CJK Unified Ideographs Extension A, and CJK Unified Ideographs Extension C blocks. A further 1,028 characters, including over 400 characters specific to the Tày language, are encoded in the CJK Unified Ideographs Extension E block. The characters are taken from the Vietnamese standards TCVN 5773:1993 and TCVN 6909:2001 [error for TCVN 6056:1995?], as well as from research by the Han-Nom Research Institute and other groups. All the characters in TCVN 5773:1993 and about 95% of the characters in TCVN 6909:2001 [error for TCVN 6056:1995?] have corresponding codepoints in Unicode 5.1, though TCVN 5773:1993 itself mapped most of its characters to the Private Use Area of Unicode. Unicode 13.0 added two diacritical characters to the Ideographic Symbols and Punctuation block that were commonly used to indicate borrowed characters in chữ Nôm.

The two most comprehensive Nôm fonts are the Vietnamese Nôm Preservation Foundation's Nôm Na Tống Light and the community-developed HAN NOM A/HAN NOM B, both of which place a large number of unstandardized characters in the Private Use Areas.

The Unicode Consortium's Unihan database includes Vietnamese readings of some characters but does not distinguish between Sino-Vietnamese and Nôm readings.

Like other CJKV writing systems, chữ Nôm is traditionally written vertically, from top to bottom and right to left.

Chữ Hán and chữ Nôm may also be annotated using ruby characters, which is the same as chữ Quốc Ngữ for Vietnamese.

== Text input ==
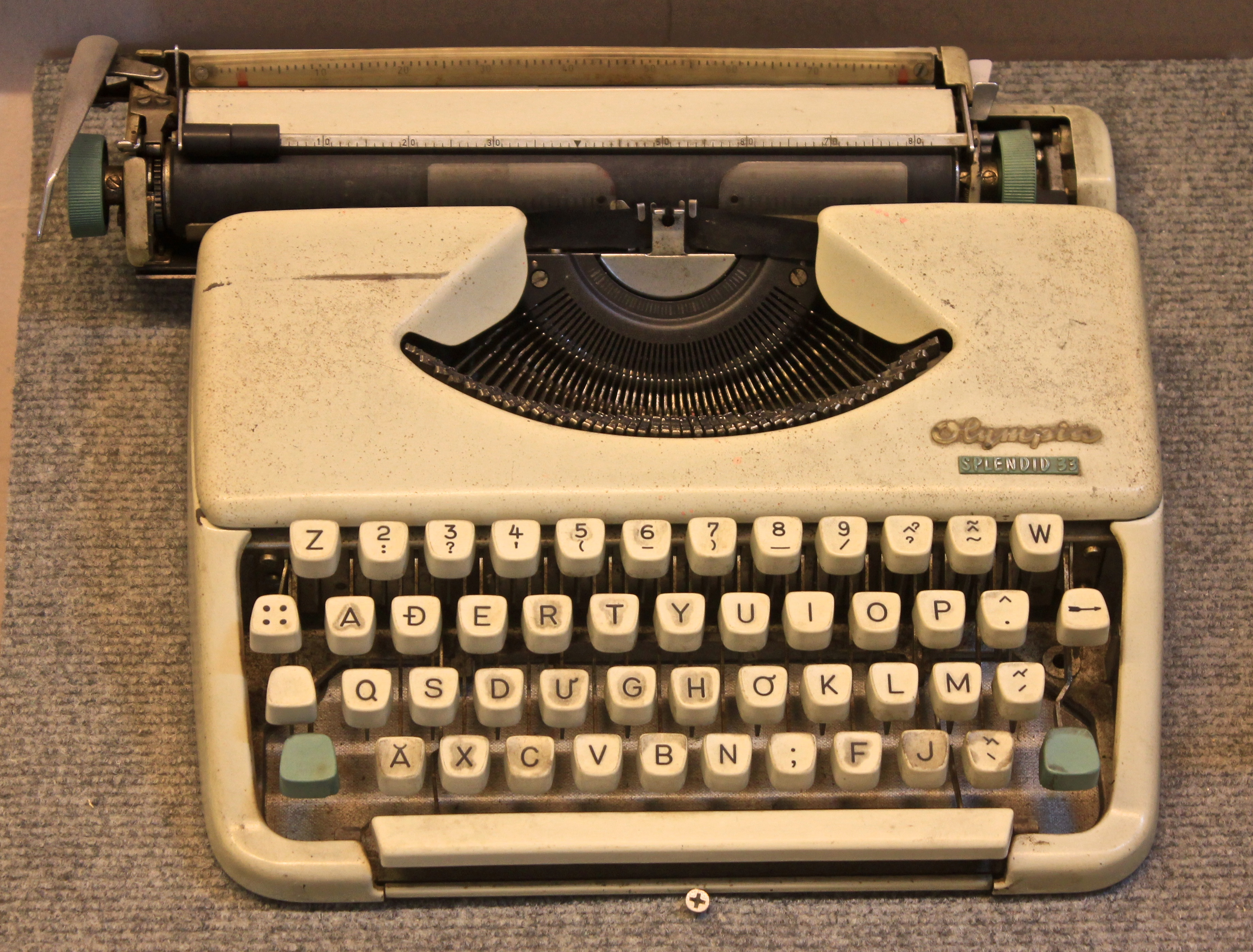
Typewriter Olympia Splendid 33, AĐERTY layout (based on AZERTY), used in Vietnam in the 1960s, seen at Museum of Ho Chi Minh City

A purely physical Vietnamese keyboard would be impractical, due to the sheer number of letter-diacritic-diacritic combinations in the alphabet e.g. ờ, ị. Instead, Vietnamese input relies on formulaic software-based keyboard layouts, virtual keyboards, or input methods (also known as IMEs).

=== Keyboard layouts ===
Microsoft Windows includes a Vietnamese keyboard layout based on TCVN 6064:1995.

AZERTY-based Vietnamese typewriter keyboard layout

Vietnamese keyboard layouts rely on dead keys to compose letters with diacritics. Most desktop operating systems include a Vietnamese keyboard layout similar to TCVN 6064:1995, a Vietnamese national standard. Previously, typewriters used an AZERTY-based Vietnamese layout (AĐERTY).

=== Input methods ===
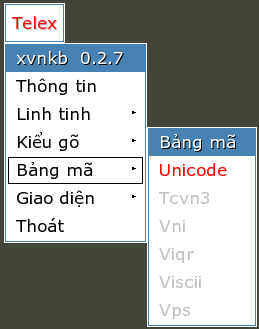
xvnkb, an IME compatible with the X Input Method framework on Unix systems, supports output in six character encodings.

The three most common Vietnamese input methods are Telex, VNI, and VIQR. Telex indicates diacritics using letters that are unlikely to appear at the end of a word, while VNI repurposes the number keys or function keys and VIQR repurposes various punctuation marks. The Telex and VIQR conventions originated in an earlier era of telex machines and typewriters, respectively.

Support for these input methods is provided by input method editors (IMEs), which are known in Vietnamese as bộ gõ, literally "peckers", "typing sets" or "percussion" in more general terms. IMEs may be provided by the operating system, installed as a third-party application, installed as a browser extension, or provided by an individual website in the form of a script. Common third-party applications include GoTiengViet, UniKey, VietKey, VPSKeys, WinVNKey, and xvnkb. On Unix-like operating systems, there are many Vietnamese input engines designed for the IBus (ibus-bamboo, ibus-bambusa, ibus-unikey, ibus-bogo), SCIM and fcitx frameworks. IME scripts such as AVIM, Mudim, and VietTyping can be found on most Vietnamese message boards, the Vietnamese Wikipedia, and other text-intensive websites. The Vietnamese Web browser Cốc Cốc comes with an input method built-in.

Input methods allow words to be composed in a more flexible order than keyboard layouts allow. For example, to enter the word "viết" using the TCVN 6064:1995 keyboard layout, one must type VI38T, in that order. By contrast, most IMEs permit the user to insert diacritics at the end of the word: VIEETS in Telex, VIET61 in VNI, or VIET^' in VIQR. Some IMEs even allow diacritics to be entered before their base letters. Depending on an IME's implementation, it may also be possible to edit an existing word's diacritics without retyping the word.

Some virtual keyboards supplement the standard dead keys with dedicated shortcut keys. For example, with the VIQR keyboard built into iOS, it is possible to add a horn to "U" by tapping either 123#+=+ or the dedicated ◌̛ key, which has no analogue on a physical keyboard.

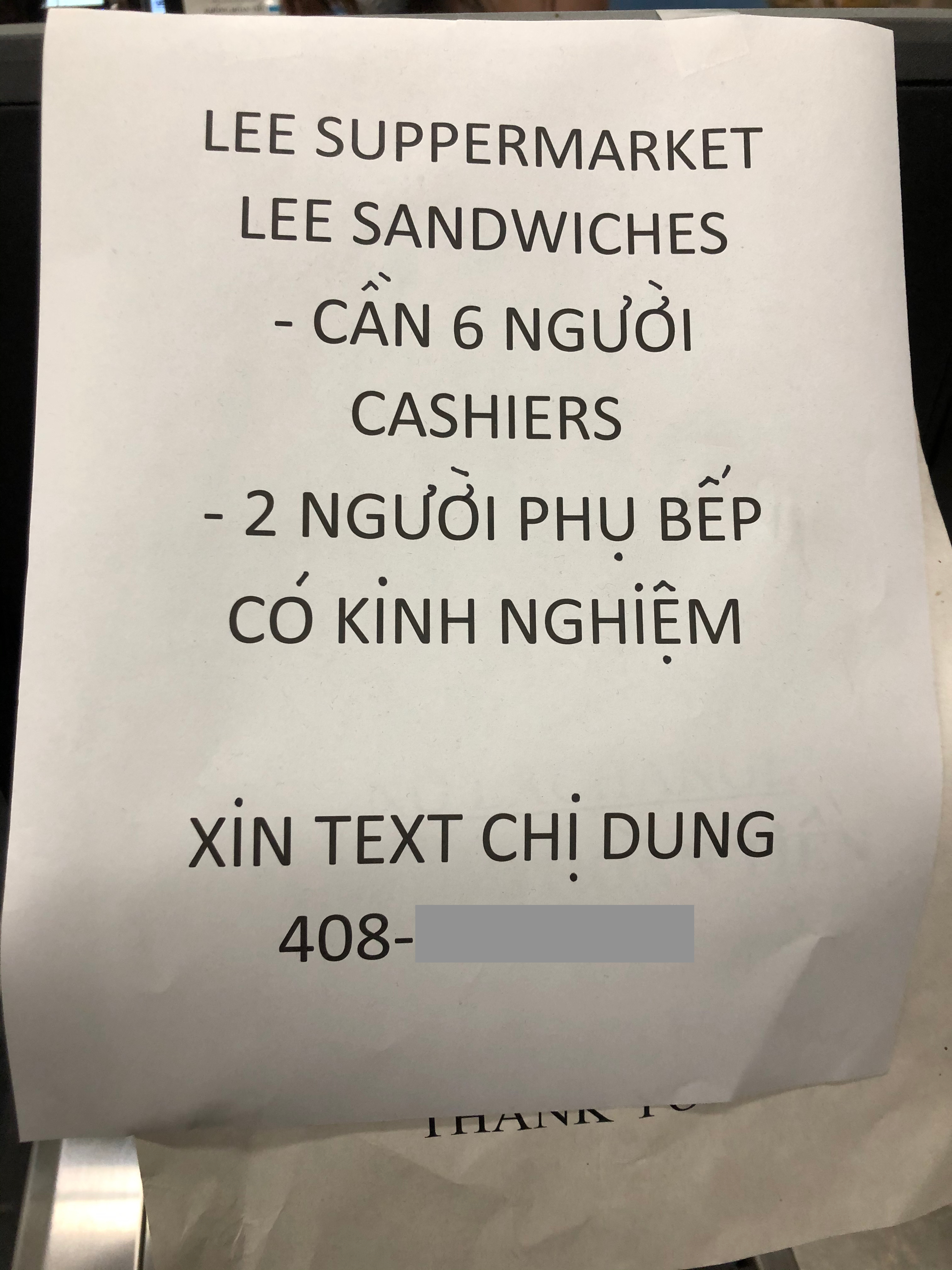
When Vietnamese input methods are unavailable, Vietnamese text is commonly printed without diacritical marks and then handwritten on.

Borrowing a feature common amongst Chinese input methods, some Vietnamese IMEs allow one to skip diacritics altogether and instead, after typing the base letters, the user can select the accented word from a candidate list. In order to provide this autocomplete list, the IME may need to communicate with a Web service. Some IMEs also use candidate lists to allow the user to convert text from the Vietnamese alphabet to chữ Nôm, because there is no one-to-one correspondence between alphabetic words and nôm characters.

== Other considerations ==
Typical Vietnamese text contains a high proportion of compound words. Compound words are never hyphenated in contemporary usage, so spell checkers are limited to checking individual syllables unless a statistical language model is consulted.

Vietnamese has rigid spelling rules and few exceptions, so text-to-speech engines may avoid dictionary lookups except when encountering a foreign loan word. TTS engines must account for tones, which are essential to the meaning of any Vietnamese word e.g. má (mother) is a different word to mà (but).

Internationalized user interfaces are generally unable to use the full complement of Vietnamese pronouns that would be expected in a traditional social setting, even when much is known about the user. Instead, user interfaces typically use generic pronouns such as tôi and bạn, some of which make potentially incorrect assumptions about the user's age and relationship to other users. For example, when a social media platform notifies a user about a younger user, it may refer to the latter in the third person as anh ấy instead of em ấy, leading the user to misinterpret the notification as a reference to someone else.

== See also ==
- Chinese input methods for computers
- Japanese language and computers
- Korean language and computers
