= Vietnamese tilde =

Curved diacritic used in the early Vietnamese alphabet

The Vietnamese tilde, also known by its Latin name of apex, was a curved diacritic used in the 17th century to mark final nasalization in the early Vietnamese alphabet. It was an adoption of the Portuguese tilde, and should not be confused with the tone mark ngã, which is encoded as a tilde in Unicode (and in Vietnamese derivatives of ISO-8859-1 such as VISCII, VPS or Windows-1258), despite actually being an adoption of the Greek perispomeni. (Note: Nguyen, Minh; Miller, Kirk (2024-04-05). "Conflict with the Unicode tilde" (PDF). Annotation request for Vietnamese apex. pp. 2–3. UTC L2/24-111. [Note that equating specifically U+1DD1 with the Vietnamese Apex, as proposed in that document, was opposed by the Medieval Unicode Font Initiative.]) Apex is the Latin name used in contemporary texts.

In his 1651 Dictionarium Annamiticum Lusitanum et Latinum, Alexandre de Rhodes describes the diacritic:

The third sign, finally, is the apex, which in this language is entirely necessary because of a difference in the ending [i.e. of a word], which the apex makes entirely distinct from the ending that m or n makes, with a meaning entirely diverse in words in which it is employed. However, this sign, namely the apex, only affects o᷃ and u᷃, at the end of a word, as ao᷃ "bee", ou᷃ "grandfather" or "lord". It is pronounced, however, such that neither the lips touch together nor the tongue touches the palate.

— Dictionarium Annamiticum Lusitanum et Latinum

The tilde appears atop ⟨o⟩, ⟨u⟩, and less commonly ⟨ơ⟩. As with other accent marks, a tone mark can appear atop the tilde.

According to canon law historian Roland Jacques, the tilde indicated a final labial-velar nasal [ŋ͡m], an allophone of /ŋ/ that is peculiar to the Hanoi dialect to the present day. The tilde apparently fell out of use during the mid-18th century, being unified with ⟨-ng⟩ (representing /ŋ/), in a major simplification of the orthography, though the Vietnamese Jesuit Philipphê Bỉnh (Philiphê do Rosario) continued to use the old orthography into the early 19th century. In Pierre Pigneau de Behaine and Jean-Louis Taberd's 1838 Dictionarium Anamitico-Latinum, the words ao᷃ and ou᷃ became ong and ông, respectively.

The Middle Vietnamese tilde is known as dấu sóng or dấu lưỡi câu in modern Vietnamese. The nasal tilde is sometimes mistaken for the tone mark ngã in modern reproductions of early Vietnamese writing, such as in Phạm Thế Ngũ's Việt Nam văn học sử.

== Examples ==
Obtained from Dictionarium Annamiticum Lusitanum et Latinum, a trilingual Vietnamese, Portuguese and Latin dictionary by Jesuit Alexandre de Rhodes.

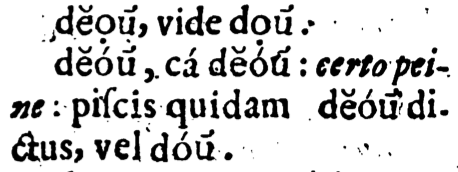
The entry for dĕóu᷃ shows distinct breves (ĕ), acutes (ó), and tildes (u᷃).

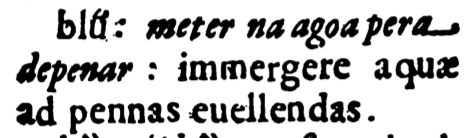
The entry for blu᷃́ shows that a vowel with a tilde can take on an additional tone mark, in this case an acute.

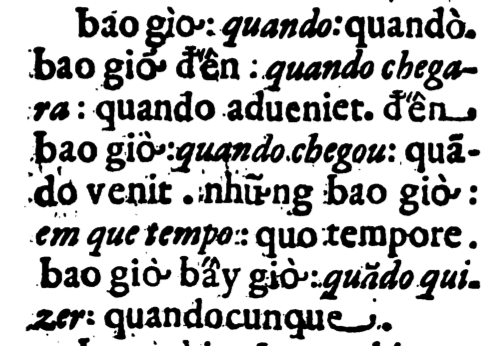
The entry for bao giơ᷃ đến illustrates the difference between a horn and a tilde.
