= VNI (disambiguation) =

VNI may refer to:

- Virtual network interface
- VNI (molecule)
- VNI Software Company
