= Hồ Thành Việt =

Vietnamese computer programmer

Hồ Thành Việt (English: John Hồ; 1955–2003) was a Vietnamese-American computer engineer and entrepreneur who is credited with making desktop publishing more accessible to Vietnamese speakers.

== Biography ==
Việt was born in Nha Trang, South Vietnam, on July 20, 1955. He fled South Vietnam aboard a United States Navy ship on the same day that Saigon fell, leaving his family behind, and arrived in California unable to speak English. He graduated from California State University, Fullerton, in 1985 with a degree in electrical engineering. After working at various computer companies, he founded VNI Software Company in 1987 and began working there full-time the following year. VNI was one of the first companies to market software designed for the Vietnamese language.

He died on August 28, 2003, in Fountain Valley, California.
