= VNLabs =

Software company

VNLabs or VN Labs is a software company based in San Jose, California, that specializes in input methods for various languages.

== History ==
VN Labs was founded in 1984 by Viet Nguyen, an engineer at Teledyne, in Newport Beach, California. The previous year, as a side project, he had created an PC-compatible input method for the Vietnamese alphabet to improve the usability of his friend's astrology program. Nguyen began marketing his software to Little Saigon's many Vietnamese-language newspapers and magazines. In 1986, Người Việt Daily News adopted the input method, now named Diplomat, so that staffers would not have to mark up entire issues with diacritical marks by hand. By 1987, Nguyen left Teledyne to focus on VN Labs full-time.

Unlike its competitor VNI, which also developed an input method, VN Labs went beyond Vietnamese and the Little Saigon community. By 1989, the Diplomat Software Series supported 23 languages, including Albanian and Urdu, and was adopted by clients including AT&T, the National Gallery of Art, New York University, Olympic Airways, Polaroid, the United Nations, the United States Navy, and the United States Department of State. VN Labs introduced support for Windows 3.0 in 1990 and subsequently added support for the Macintosh and the Unicode encoding standard.

== Products ==
The Diplomat Software Series is a collection of 23 software packages. Each package supports a single language. The MS-DOS version of each package includes a memory-resident input method and printer driver. Versions for Microsoft Windows and Macintosh operating systems include an input method and various Unicode fonts.
