= Vulcanbot =

2009 computer trojan

Vulcanbot is a Trojan botnet predominantly spread in Vietnam, apparently with political motives. It is thought to have started spreading in late 2009.

The botnet began to spread after the website of the Vietnamese Professionals Society (vps.org) was hacked and the legitimate Vietnamese keyboard driver VPSKeys hosted on the site was replaced with a backdoored version. Google posted on its blog that it believed the botnet thus created was used predominantly to DDoS bloggers critical of the bauxite mining in Vietnam, thus making it a politically motivated attack. McAfee compared it to Operation Aurora, which was also active in 2009, but found it to be unrelated. Approximately 15,000 computers were infected. Since the government of Vietnam was also seeking to suppress criticism in 2010, it was suggested that it was government-backed.
