= D with stroke =

Variant of the letter D

- Đ đ

Usage
- Type: alphabetic
- Language of origin: Brahui, Jarai, Kiowa, Moro, North Frisian, Northern Sami, Serbo-Croatian, Sicilian, Skolt Sami, Slovene, Vietnamese
- Sound values: [dʑ]; [dz]; [ð]; [dʒ]; [ɗe˧]; [ɗ]; [ʔd]; [z]; [j]; [θ]

History
Development
K1K2O31
      - Δ δ
        - 𐌃
          - D d
            - Đ đ
- Transliterations: Ђ ђ; Ѓ ѓ; Dj dj; Џ џ; D` d`

Đ (lowercase: đ, Latin alphabet), known as crossed D or dyet, is a letter formed from the base character D/d overlaid with a crossbar. Crossing was used to create eth (ð), but eth has an uncial as its base whereas đ is based on the straight-backed roman d, like in the Sámi languages and Vietnamese. Crossed d is a letter in the alphabets of several languages and is sometimes used in linguistics as a substitute for a voiced dental fricative /ð/.

== Appearance ==
In the lowercase, the crossbar is usually drawn through the ascender, but when used as a phonetic symbol it may be preferred to draw it through the bowl, in which case it is known as a barred d. In some African languages' orthographies, such as that of Moro, the barred d is preferred.

In the uppercase, the crossbar normally crosses just the left stem, but in Vietnamese and Moro it may sometimes cross the entire letter.

The DE ligature should not be confused with the Đ. That ligature was used stylistically in pre-19th century Spanish as a contraction for de, as a D with an E superimposed. For example, Universidad DE Guadalajara.

== Uses by language ==
=== African languages ===
A lowercase ⟨đ⟩ appeared alongside a lowercase retroflex D in a 1982 revision of the African reference alphabet. This revision of the alphabet eliminated uppercase forms, so there was no conflict between ⟨ɖ⟩ and ⟨đ⟩.

=== Kven ===
The letter ⟨Đ⟩, which is not used in standard Finnish, became used in Kven language texts in the early 2020s for the fricative [ð], with its users as of March 2025 including the Norwegian Directorate for Civil Protection (e.g. Omavalmhiuđen tarkistuslista), NRK (e.g. Pienemät piđot Hortenissa), and Kainun Institutti (e.g. Sillä heiđän kieli oon muuttunu omhaan laihiin.).

=== Latin ===
⟨Đ⟩ was used in Medieval Latin to mark abbreviations of words containing the letter d. For example, hđum could stand for heredum "of the heirs". Similar crossbars were added to other letters to form abbreviations.

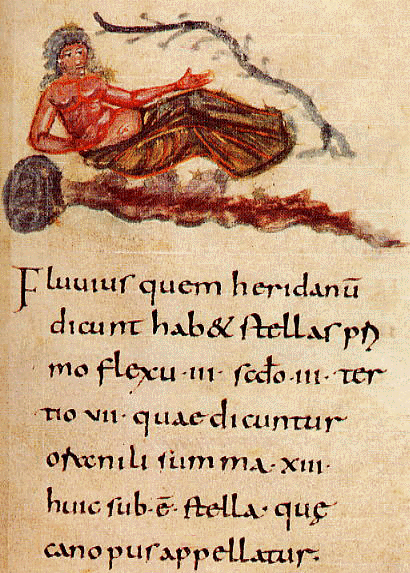
A 9th century Latin manuscript. The abbreviation ſcđo (secundo, "second") occurs on the third line.

=== South Slavic languages ===
⟨Đ⟩ is used to write the voiced alveolo-palatal affricate, [dʑ], similar to the ⟨j⟩ in "jam".

⟨Đ⟩ was introduced by the Serbian philologist Đuro Daničić in 1878 for use in Serbo-Croatian in his Dictionary of the Croatian or Serbian Language, replacing the older digraphs ⟨dj⟩ and ⟨gj⟩. Daničić modeled the letter after the Icelandic and Anglo-Saxon letter eth, albeit representing a different sound. In 1892 it was officially introduced in Croatian and Slavonian schools (in the Habsburg Kingdom of Croatia-Slavonia where the Croatian language was official) and so definitively added to Gaj’s Latin alphabet. The letter thereafter gradually entered daily use, spreading throughout Serbo-Croatian and then to Macedonian (its Latin transliterations are heavily influenced by Serbo-Croatian from the Yugoslav period).

⟨Đ⟩ is today considered a distinct letter, and is placed between Dž and E in alphabetical order. Its Cyrillic equivalent is Ђ ђ. Its partial equivalent in Macedonian is Ѓ ѓ (because only some dialects contain the /dʑ/ sound). When a true ⟨đ⟩ is not available or desired, it is transcribed as ⟨dj⟩ in modern Serbo-Croatian, and as ⟨gj⟩ in Macedonian. The use of ⟨dj⟩ in place of ⟨đ⟩ used to be more common in Serbo-Croatian texts, but it is falling out of practice.

=== Sámi languages ===
In the present-day orthographies of Northern Sámi, Inari Sámi and Skolt Sámi, ⟨đ⟩ represents the fricative [ð]. It is considered a distinct letter and placed between D and E in alphabetical order.

=== Vietnamese ===
A page from the đ section of de Rhodes's Dictioniarum Annamiticum, a 1651 Vietnamese-Portuguese-Latin dictionary. As with the B with flourish, ⟨Đ⟩ only appears in lowercase in de Rhodes's works.

In the Vietnamese alphabet, ⟨Đ⟩ represents a voiced alveolar implosive (/ɗ/) or, according to Thompson (1959), a preglottalized voiced alveolar stop (/ʔd/). An unadorned ⟨D⟩ in Vietnamese represents either /z/ (Hanoian) or /j/ (Saigonese).

⟨Đ⟩ is the seventh letter of the Vietnamese alphabet, after ⟨D⟩ and before ⟨E⟩. Traditionally, digraphs and trigraphs like ⟨CH⟩ and ⟨NGH⟩ were considered letters as well, making ⟨Đ⟩ the eighth letter. ⟨Đ⟩ is a letter in its own right, rather than a ligature or letter-diacritic combination; therefore, đá would come after dù in any alphabetical listing.

The Vietnamese alphabet was formally described for the first time in the 17th-century text Manuductio ad Linguam Tunckinensem, attributed to a Portuguese Jesuit missionary, possibly Francisco de Pina or Filipe Sibin. This passage about the letter Đ was later incorporated into Alexandre de Rhodes' seminal Dictionarium Annamiticum Lusitanum et Latinum:

Another letter written with the symbol đ is completely different than our own and is pronounced by raising the tip of the tongue to the palate of the mouth, immediately removing it, without in any way touching the teeth, for example đa đa: partridge. And this letter is very commonly used at the beginning of a word.

— Manuductio ad Linguam Tunckinensem (Note: As printed in Hồn Việt: Alterum đ notatur eo signo, quia est omnino diversù à nostro et pronunciatur attollendo extremum linguae ad palatum oris illamque statim amovendo absque eo, quod ullo modo dentes attingat, ùt đa đa: perdrix. Et haec littera est valde in usu in principio dictionis. As paraphrased by de Rhodes: ...estque vitium linguæ, aliud đ notatur eo signo quia est omninò diversum à nostro & pronunciatur attollendo extremum linguæ ad palatum oris, illamque statim amovendo, absque eo quod ullo modo dentes attingat ut đa đa, perdix: & hæc litera est valdè in usu in principio dictionis.)

On older typewriters, Đ was located where Z would be in the French AZERTY layout. Alternatively, a hyphen can be overstruck onto a D.

On computers without support for a Vietnamese character set or Unicode, ⟨Đ⟩ is encoded as DD and ⟨đ⟩ as dd according to the Vietnamese Quoted-Readable standard. Vietnamese computer users typically input ⟨Đ⟩ as DD in the Telex and VIQR input methods or as D9 in the VNI input method. In the absence of an input method, the TCVN 6064:1995 and Microsoft Windows Vietnamese keyboard layouts map ZA0-09 (0 on a U.S. keyboard) to ⟨đ⟩, or ⟨Đ⟩ when holding down ⇧ Shift. The Windows layout also maps ZA0-11 (=) to ₫.

Other modes of communication also have dedicated representations of ⟨Đ⟩. In Vietnamese Braille, it is ⠙, which corresponds to ⟨D⟩ in French Braille. In the Vietnamese manual alphabet, ⟨Đ⟩ is produced by touching the thumb to the index finger. In Morse code, it is rendered – · · – · ·, corresponding to Telex's "DD".

=== Spanish ===
The Spanish language used ⟨Đ⟩ as a ligature of the word de ('of'). It is rarely typed, but it was commonly used on signs and in handwritten text, especially in Old Spanish.

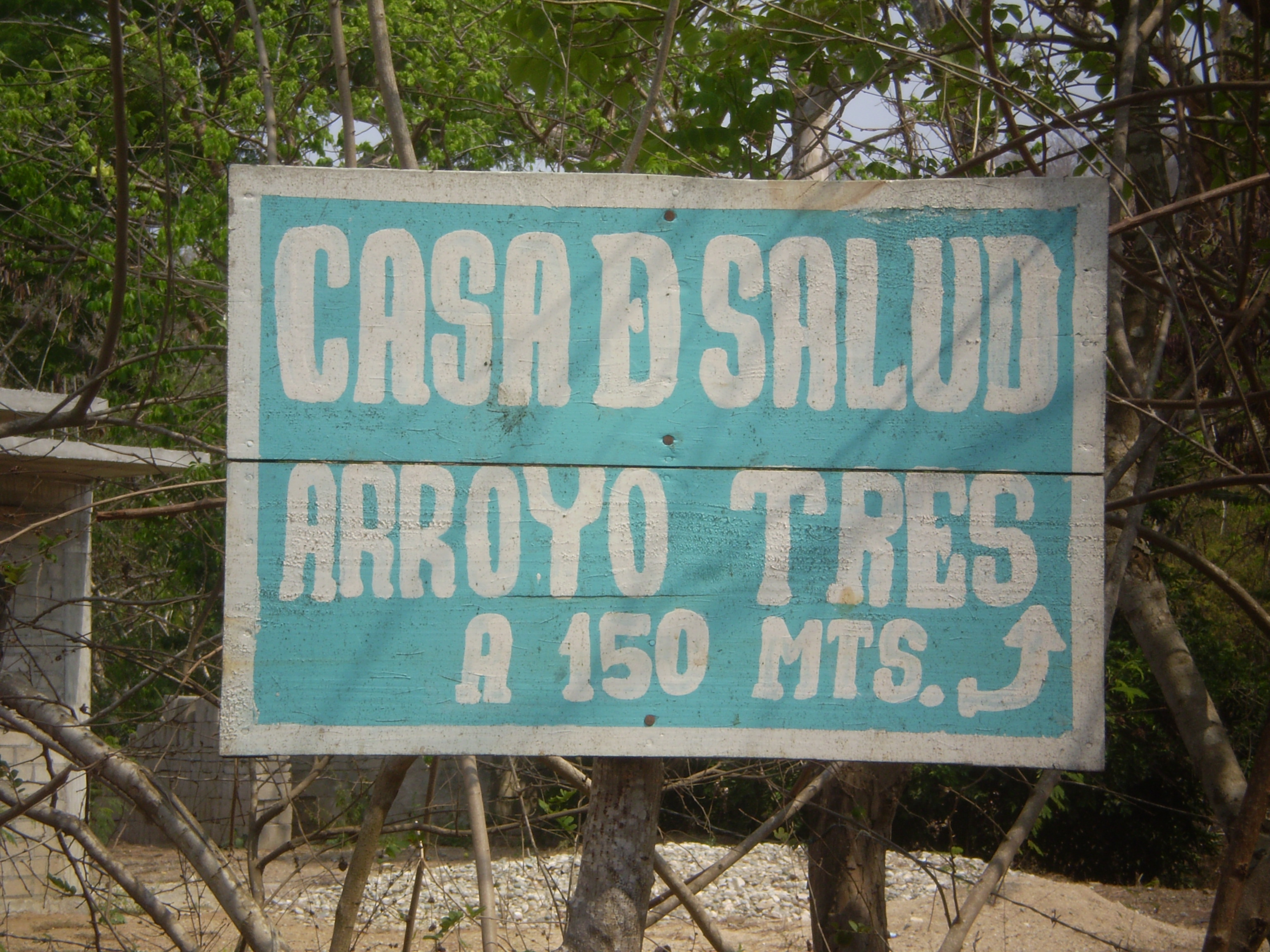
Sign with the letter Đ, in Oaxaca, Mexico

Spanish letter Đ, in the font Coruña

Spanish letter Đ used on the Coat of Arms of the State of Chihuahua Mexico.

== Other uses ==
=== Phonetic transcription ===
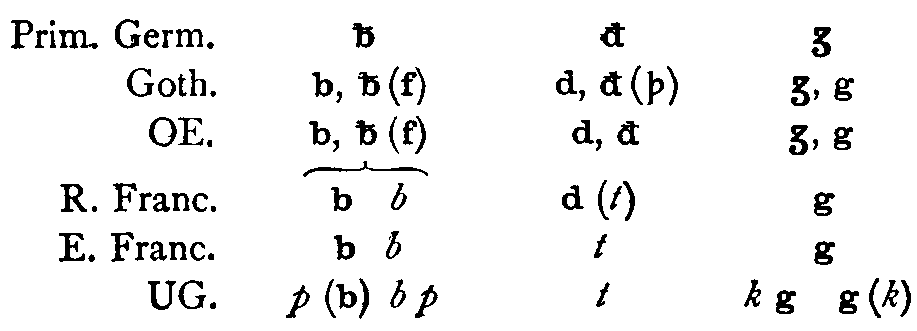
An example of đ being used for a voiced dental fricative in
the phonetic transcription of early Germanic languages,
alongside ƀ for bilabial and ʒ for velar, from Joseph Wright's Old
High German Primer (1906).

The lowercase đ is used in some phonetic transcription schemes to represent a voiced dental fricative [ð] (English th in this). Eth (ð) is more commonly used for this purpose, but the crossed d has the advantage of being able to be typed on a standard typewriter, by overlaying a hyphen over a d.

=== Currency symbols ===
A minuscule form of the letter, đ, is the symbol of the đồng, the currency of Vietnam, by a 1953 decree by Hồ Chí Minh. The South Vietnamese đồng, on the other hand, was symbolized "Đ.", in majuscule. In Unicode, the Vietnamese đồng symbol is properly represented by U+20AB ₫ DONG SIGN, but U+0111 đ LATIN SMALL LETTER D WITH STROKE is often used instead. In Vietnamese, the đồng sign is written after the amount in superscript, often underlined.

The uppercase form, Ð, is used as the currency symbol for the cryptocurrency Dogecoin.

=== Chemistry ===
Dispersity is represented by the symbol Đ, and is a measure of the heterogeneity of sizes of molecules or particles in a mixture, referring to either molecular mass or degree of polymerization.

=== Disambiguation ===
In Japanese handwriting, the letter D may be written as Đ to clearly distinguish it from the letter O or the digit 0. This is similar to writing Z or 7 with a bar to distinguish them from 2 and 1 respectively.

== Computer encoding ==
Character information
Preview	Đ		đ	
Unicode name	LATIN CAPITAL LETTER D WITH STROKE		LATIN SMALL LETTER D WITH STROKE	
Encodings	decimal	hex	dec	hex
Unicode	272	U+0110	273	U+0111
UTF-8	196 144	C4 90	196 145	C4 91
Numeric character reference	&#272;	&#x110;	&#273;	&#x111;
Named character reference	&Dstrok;		&dstrok;	
ISO Latin-2, -4, -10	208	D0	240	F0
Latin-6	169	A9	185	B9
PostScript	Dcroat, Dslash		dcroat, dmacron	
LaTeX	\DJ		\dj	

In Unicode, both crossed d and barred d are considered glyph variants of U+0111.

Unicode has a distinct code point for the visually very similar capital eth, Ð, U+00D0, which can lead to confusion.

As part of WGL4, Đ and đ can be expected to display correctly even on older Windows systems.

== See also ==
- Eth (Ð, ð), used in the Faroese and Icelandic languages
- African D (Ɖ, ɖ)
- I with bar (Ɨ, ɨ)
- U with bar (Ʉ, ʉ)
