= Vietnamese alphabet =

Latin script for the Vietnamese language

Vietnamese alphabet chữ Quốc ngữ
- Script type: Alphabet
- Creator: Francisco de Pina and other Jesuits
- Languages: Vietnamese, other indigenous languages of Vietnam

Related scripts
- Parent systems: Egyptian hieroglyphs: Proto-Sinaitic; Phoenician alphabet; Greek alphabet; Latin script; Portuguese alphabet; Vietnamese alphabet
- Child systems: Bahnar alphabet, Nùng alphabet, Tày alphabet

The Vietnamese alphabet (Vietnamese: chữ Quốc ngữ, lit. 'script of the national language' [t͡ɕɨ˦ˀ˥ kuək̚˧˦ ŋɨ˦ˀ˥]) is a Latin-based modern writing script for the Vietnamese language. It has spelling conventions derived from the orthography of Romance languages such as Portuguese, Italian, and French. It was originally developed by the Portuguese missionary Francisco de Pina and other Jesuits in the early 17th century.

The Vietnamese alphabet contains 29 letters, including 7 letters using four diacritics: ⟨ă⟩, ⟨â⟩, ⟨ê⟩, ⟨ô⟩, ⟨ơ⟩, ⟨ư⟩, and ⟨đ⟩. There are an additional 5 diacritics used to designate tone (as in ⟨à⟩, ⟨á⟩, ⟨ả⟩, ⟨ã⟩, and ⟨ạ⟩). The complex vowel system and the large number of letters with diacritics, which can stack twice on the same letter (e.g. nhất meaning 'first'), makes it easy to distinguish the Vietnamese orthography from other writing systems that use the Latin alphabet.

The Vietnamese system's use of diacritics produces an accurate transcription for tones despite the limitations of the Roman alphabet. On the other hand, sound changes in the spoken language have led to different letters, digraphs and trigraphs now representing the same sounds.

== Letter names and pronunciation ==
Vietnamese uses 22 letters of the ISO basic Latin alphabet. The 4 remaining letters are not considered part of the Vietnamese alphabet although they are used to write loanwords, languages of other ethnic groups in the country based on Vietnamese phonetics to differentiate the meanings or even Vietnamese dialects, for example: ⟨dz⟩ or ⟨z⟩ for southerner pronunciation of ⟨v⟩ in standard Vietnamese.

In total, there are 12 vowels (nguyên âm) and 17 consonants (phụ âm, literally 'extra sound').

Cursive Vietnamese alphabet

Vietnamese alphabet
Letter	Input keys		Name	IPA		
Letter	TELEX	VNI	Name	Hanoi	Nghệ An	Sài Gòn
**A, a**			a	ʔaː˧˧	ʔaː˧˥	ʔaː˧˧
**Ă, ă**	AW	A8	á	ʔaː˧˥	ʔaː˩˩	ʔaː˧˥
**Â, â**	AA	A6	ớ	ʔəː˧˥	ʔəː˩˩	ʔəː˧˥
B, b			bê	ʔɓe˧˧	ʔɓe˧˥	ʔɓe˧˧
C, c			xê	se˧˧	se˧˥	se˧˧
D, d			dê	ze˧˧	ze˧˥	je˧˧
Đ, đ	DD	D9	đê	ʔɗe˧˧	ʔɗe˧˥	ʔɗe˧˧
**E, e**			e	ʔɛ˧˧	ʔɛ˧˥	ʔɛ˧˧
**Ê, ê**	EE	E6	ê	ʔe˧˧	ʔe˧˥	ʔe˧˧
G, g			giê	zə˧˧	zə˧˥	jə˧˧
H, h			hát	haːt˧˥	haːt˩˩	haːk˧˥
**I, i**			i ngắn	ʔi˧˧	ʔi˧˥	ʔi˧˧
K, k			ca	kaː˧˧	kaː˧˥	kaː˧˧
L, l			e-lờ	ʔɛ˧˧ lə̤ː˨˩	ʔɛ˧˥ ləː˧˧	ʔɛ˧˧ ləː˨˩
M, m			em-mờ	ʔɛm˧˧ mə̤ː˨˩	ʔɛm˧˥ məː˧˧	ʔɛm˧˧ məː˨˩
N, n			en-nờ	ʔɛn˧˧ nə̤ː˨˩	ʔɛn˧˥ nəː˧˧	ʔɛŋ˧˧ nəː˨˩
**O, o**			o	ʔɔ˧˧	ʔɔ˧˥	ʔɔ˧˧
**Ô, ô**	OO	O6	ô	ʔo˧˧	ʔo˧˥	ʔo˧˧
**Ơ, ơ**	OW	O7	ơ	ʔəː˧˧	ʔəː˧˥	ʔəː˧˧
P, p			pê	pe˧˧	pe˧˥	pe˧˧
Q, q			quy	kwi˧˧	kwi˧˥	wi˧˧
R, r			e-rờ	ʔɛ˧˧ zə̤ː˨˩	ʔɛ˧˥ ɹəː˧˧	ʔɛ˧˧ ɹəː˨˩
S, s			ét-si	ʔɛt˧˥ si̤˨˩	ʔɛt˩˩ si˧˧	ʔɛk˧˥ ʂi˨˩
T, t			tê	te˧˧	te˧˥	te˧˧
**U, u**			u	ʔu˧˧	ʔu˧˥	ʔu˧˧
**Ư, ư**	UW/W	U7	ư	ʔɨ˧˧	ʔɨ˧˥	ʔɨ˧˧
V, v			vê	ve˧˧	ve˧˥	je˧˧
X, x			ích-xì	ʔik˧˥ si̤˨˩	ʔik˩˩ si˧˧	ʔɨt˧˥ si˨˩
**Y, y**			i dài	ʔi˧˧ za̤ːj˨˩	ʔi˧˥ zaːj˧˧	ʔi˧˧ jaːj˨˩

Notes

Vietnamese unused letters
Letter	Name (when pronounced)	Hà Nội		Nghệ An		Sài Gòn	
Letter	Name (when pronounced)	IPA	Phoneme	IPA	Phoneme	IPA	Phoneme
F, f	ép	ʔɛp˧˥	/f/	ʔɛp˩˩	/f/	ʔɛp˧˥	/f/
J, j	gi	zi̤˧˧	/z/	ji˧˥	/z/	ji˧˧	/j/
W, w	vê kép / đớp lưu	ve˧˧ kɛp˧˥	/w/	ve˧˥ kɛp˩˩	/w/	je˧˧ kɛp˧˥	/w/
Z, z	dét	zɛt˧˥	/z/	zɛt˩˩	/z/	jɛk˧˥	/j/

- The vowels in the table are bolded and italicized.
- The use of the terms bê bò or bờ bò to refer to ⟨b⟩ and as pê phở or pờ phở to refer to ⟨p⟩ is to avoid confusion in some contexts, the same for ⟨s⟩ as sờ mạnh or sờ nặng (literally, 'strong s' or 'heavy s') and ⟨x⟩ as xờ nhẹ (literally, 'light x'), ⟨i⟩ as i ngắn (literally, 'short i') and ⟨y⟩ as y dài (literally, 'long y').
- ⟨q⟩ is always followed by ⟨u⟩ in every word and phrase in Vietnamese, e.g. quần 'trousers', quyến rũ 'to attract', etc.
- The name i-cờ-rét for ⟨y⟩ is from the French name for the letter: i grec (literally, 'Greek i'), referring to the letter's origin from the Greek letter upsilon. The other obsolete French pronunciations include ⟨e⟩ (/əː˧/) and ⟨u⟩ (/wi˧/).
- The Vietnamese alphabet lacks the 4 letters ⟨f⟩ (ép, ép-phờ), ⟨j⟩ (gi), ⟨w⟩ (đớp lưu 'double u', vê kép, vê đúp 'double v') and ⟨z⟩ (giét). However, these letters are often used for foreign loanwords (even partially adapted ones: flo 'fluorine', jun 'joule', bazơ 'base') or may be kept for foreign names.
- ⟨y⟩ is most commonly treated as a vowel along with ⟨i⟩. ⟨i⟩ represents 'short /i˧/' and ⟨y⟩ represents 'long /i˧/'. ⟨y⟩ can have tones as well as other vowels (⟨ý⟩, ⟨ỳ⟩, ⟨ỹ⟩, ⟨ỷ⟩, ⟨ỵ⟩) e.g. Mỹ 'America'. It may also act as a consonant (when used after ⟨â⟩ and ⟨a⟩). It can sometimes be used to replace ⟨i⟩, e.g. bánh mì 'bread' can sometimes be written bánh mỳ by some people, but it is not generally considered standard or accurate.
- ⟨s⟩ and ⟨x⟩ are similar to each other in sound in Northern Vietnamese dialects or with some Southern Vietnamese speakers (especially in the Mekong Delta region) and can sometimes be used interchangeably between these speakers, e.g. sương xáo or sương sáo 'grass jelly'.

=== Middle Vietnamese alphabet ===
The Vietnamese alphabet in the Dictionarium Annamiticum Lusitanum et Latinum of Alexandre de Rhodes has 23 letters:

Upper case	A	B	ꞗ	C	D	đ	E	G	H	I	K	L	M	N	O	P	Q	R	S	T	V	X	Y
Lower case	a	b	ꞗ	c	d	đ	e	g	h	i	k	l	m	n	o	p	q	r	ſ/s	t	v/u	x	y

In this dictionary, there are fewer letters than the modern alphabet. The letters ă, â, ê, ô, ơ, and ư are regarded as separate letters in the modern alphabet and are used in the dictionary, but Rhodes (the author) does not regard them as separate letters. In the dictionary, a letter with diacritics, like à, ạ, ă, ằ, and ặ, are not separate from the letter a; à, ạ, ă, ằ, and ặ are just regarded as the letter a with diacritics.

In the alphabet, there is a letter, the letter b with flourish ꞗ, that has fallen out of use. It was used to represent the voiced bilabial fricative /β/.

Two letters, ꞗ and đ, are neither upper nor lower case. So according to that orthography, the names of the two provinces Đồng Nai and Lâm Đồng will be đồng Nai and Lâm đồng. In the modern alphabet, the lower case version of đ is đ, and upper case version of đ is Đ.

There are two variants of minuscule s: the long s, ſ, and the short s, s. In the modern alphabet, the long s, ſ, is no longer used, and the short s, s, is the only variant of s.

Normal v in the dictionary has two variants: the normal v, v, and the curving-bottom v, u. In the 17th century, v and u were not different letters, v being a variant of u.

== Consonants ==
The alphabet is largely derived from Portuguese with some influence from French, although the usage of ⟨gh⟩ and ⟨gi⟩ was borrowed from Italian (compare ghetto, Giuseppe) and that for ⟨c, k, qu⟩ from (Latinised) Greek and Latin (compare canis, kinesis, quō vādis), mirroring the English usage of these letters (compare cat, kite, queen).

There is one trigraph, ⟨ngh⟩, and ten digraphs: ⟨ch⟩, ⟨gh⟩, ⟨gi⟩, ⟨kh⟩, ⟨ng⟩, ⟨nh⟩, ⟨ph⟩, ⟨qu⟩, ⟨th⟩, ⟨tr⟩.

Consonants
Grapheme	Pronunciation (IPA)						Notes
Grapheme	Syllable-initial			Syllable-final			Notes
Grapheme	Northern	Central	Southern	Northern	Central	Southern	Notes
B b	/ɓ/						
C c	/k/			/k̚/~/k̚ʷ/			⟨k⟩ is used instead when preceding ⟨i, y, e, ê⟩. ⟨qu⟩ is used instead of ⟨co, cu⟩ if a /w/ on-glide exists. Realized as [k̚ʷ] or [k͡p̚] word-finally following rounded vowels ⟨u, ô, o⟩.
Ch ch	/t͡ɕ/	/c/		/k̟̚/	/t̚/		Multiple phonemic analyses of the Northern realization of final ⟨ch⟩ have been proposed.
D d	/z/	/j/					In Middle Vietnamese, ⟨d⟩ represented /ð/. The distinction between ⟨d⟩ and ⟨gi⟩ is now purely etymological in most modern dialects, although it is noted that some Southerners may pronounce ⟨gi⟩ as /z/ if distinction from ⟨d⟩ is strictly necessary.
Đ đ	/ɗ/						
G g	/ɣ/						
Gh gh	/ɣ/						Used instead of ⟨g⟩ before ⟨i, e, ê⟩, seemingly to follow the Italian convention. ⟨g⟩ is not allowed in these environments.
Gi gi	/z/	/j/~/z/					In Middle Vietnamese, ⟨gi⟩ represented /ʝ/. The distinction between ⟨d⟩ and ⟨gi⟩ is now purely etymological in most modern dialects, although it is noted that some Southerners may pronounce ⟨gi⟩ as /z/ if distinction from ⟨d⟩ is strictly necessary. Spelled ⟨g⟩ before another ⟨i⟩. (Note: This causes some ambiguity with the diphthong ⟨ia, iê⟩, for example gia could be either ⟨gi⟩+⟨a⟩ [za ~ ja] or ⟨gi⟩+⟨ia⟩ [ziə̯ ~ jiə̯]. If there is a tone mark the ambiguity is resolved: giá is ⟨gi⟩+⟨á⟩ and gía is ⟨gi⟩+⟨ía⟩.)
H h	/h/						
K k	/k/						Used instead of ⟨c⟩ before ⟨i, y, e, ê⟩ to follow the European tradition. ⟨c⟩ is not allowed in these environments.
Kh kh	/x/						In Middle Vietnamese, ⟨kh⟩ represented [kʰ]
L l	/l/						
M m	/m/						
N n	/n/				/ŋ/~/n/		In Southern Vietnamese, word-final ⟨n⟩ is realized as [ŋ] if not following ⟨i, ê⟩.
Ng ng	/ŋ/			/ŋ/~/ŋʷ/			Realized as [ŋʷ] or [ŋ͡m] word finally after rounded vowels ⟨u, ô, o⟩.
Ngh ngh	/ŋ/						Spelling used instead of ⟨ng⟩ before ⟨i, e, ê⟩ in accordance with ⟨gh⟩.
Nh nh	/ɲ/			/ŋ̟/	/n/		Multiple phonemic analyses of the Northern realization of final ⟨nh⟩ have been proposed.
P p	/p/~/ɓ/			/p̚/			Only occurs initially in loanwords. Some Vietnamese pronounce it as a ⟨b⟩ sound instead (a similar process occurs among speakers of Arabic, which lacks an unvoiced counterpart to /b/).
Ph ph	/f/						In Middle Vietnamese, ⟨ph⟩ represented [pʰ]
Qu qu	/kw/		/w/				Used in place of ⟨co, cu⟩ if a /w/ on-glide exists.
R r	/z/	/r/					Realized as [ʒ] in Northern spelling pronunciation. In southern speech, the phoneme /r/, generally represented in Vietnamese linguistics by the letter ⟨r⟩, has a number of variant pronunciations. It may occur as a retroflex fricative [ʐ], an alveolar approximant [ɹ], an alveolar flap [ɾ], a trill [r], a velar fricative [ɣ], and a palatal approximant [j]. The last two are not considered standard.
S s	/s/	/ʂ/					Realized as [ʃ] in Northern spelling pronunciation.
T t	/t/			/t̚/	/k̚/~/t̚/		In Southern Vietnamese, word-final ⟨t⟩ is realized as [k̚] if not following ⟨i, ê⟩.
Th th	/tʰ/						
Tr tr	/t͡ɕ/	/ʈ/					Realized as [t͡ʃ] in Northern spelling pronunciation.
V v	/v/		/j/~/v/				In Middle Vietnamese, it was spelled with the now-obsolete letter ⟨ꞗ⟩ to represent [β]. Can be realized as [v] in Southern speech through spelling pronunciation and in loanwords. In traditional performance including Cải lương, Đờn ca tài tử, Hát bội and some old speakers of Overseas Vietnamese, it is pronounced as consonant cluster [bj], [βj] or [vj].
X x	/s/						In Middle Vietnamese, ⟨x⟩ was pronounced [ɕ].

- Each consonant can also be called by the consonant followed by ờ, except for k. So b would be called bờ, c would be called cờ and so on.

== Vowels ==
=== Pronunciation ===
The correspondence between the orthography and pronunciation is somewhat complicated. In some cases, the same letter may represent several different sounds, and different letters may represent the same sound. This is because the orthography was designed centuries ago and the spoken language has changed, as shown in the chart directly above that contrasts the difference between Middle and Modern Vietnamese.

⟨i⟩ and ⟨y⟩ are mostly equivalent, and there is no concrete rule that says when to use one or the other, except in sequences like ⟨ay⟩ and ⟨uy⟩ (i.e. tay 'arm, hand' is read as /tă̄j/ while tai 'ear' is read as /tāj/). There have been attempts since the late 20th century to standardize the orthography by replacing ⟨y⟩ with ⟨i⟩ when it represents a vowel, the latest being a decision from the Vietnamese Ministry of Education in 1984. These efforts seem to have had limited effect. In textbooks published by Nhà Xuất bản Giáo dục ('Publishing House of Education'), ⟨y⟩ is used to represent /i/ only in Sino-Vietnamese words that are written with one letter ⟨y⟩ alone (diacritics can still be added, as in ⟨ý⟩, ⟨ỷ⟩), at the beginning of a syllable when followed by ⟨ê⟩ (as in yếm, yết), after ⟨u⟩ and in the sequence ⟨ay⟩; therefore such forms as *lý and *kỹ are not "standard", though they are much preferred elsewhere. Most people and the popular media continue to use the spelling that they are most accustomed to.

Spelling and pronunciation in Vietnamese
Spelling	Sound
a	/a/ ([æ] in some dialects) except as below /ă/ in au /ăw/ and ay /ăj/ (but /a/ in ao /aw/ and ai /aj/) /ăj/ before syllable-final nh /ŋ/ and ch /k/, see Vietnamese phonology#Analysis of final ch, nh /ə̯/ in ưa /ɨə̯/, ia /iə̯/ and ya /iə̯/ /ə̯/ in ua except after q (Note: qua is pronounced /kwa/ except in quay, where it is pronounced /kwă/. When not preceded by q, ua is pronounced /uə̯/.)
ă	/ă/
â	/ə̆/
e	/ɛ/
ê	/e/ except as below /ə̆j/ before syllable-final nh /ŋ/ and ch /k/, see Vietnamese phonology#Analysis of final ch, nh /ə̯/ in iê /iə̯/ and yê /iə̯/
i	/i/ except as below /j/ after any vowel letter
o	/ɔ/ except as below /ăw/ before ng and c (Note: However, oong and ooc are pronounced /ɔŋ/ and /ɔk/.) /w/ after any vowel letter (= after a or e) /w/ before any vowel letter except i (= before ă, a or e)
ô	/o/ except as below /ə̆w/ before ng and c except after a u that is not preceded by a q (Note: uông and uôc are pronounced /uə̯ŋ/ and /uə̯k/ when not preceded by a q.) /ə̯/ in uô except after q (Note: quô is pronounced /kwo/ except in quông and quôc, where it is pronounced /kwə̆w/. When not preceded by q, uô is pronounced /uə̯/.)
ơ	/ə/ except as below /ə̯/ in ươ /ɨə̯/
u	/u/ except as below /w/ after q or any vowel letter /w/ before any vowel letter except a, ô and i Before a, ô and i: /w/ if preceded by q, /u/ otherwise
ư	/ɨ/
y	/i/ except as below /j/ after any vowel letter except u (= after â and a)

The uses of ⟨i⟩ and ⟨y⟩ to represent the phoneme /i/ can be categorized as "standard" (as used in textbooks published by Nhà Xuất bản Giáo dục) and "non-standard" as follows.

Standard spellings in Vietnamese
Context	"Standard"	"Non-standard"
In one-lettered non-Sino-Vietnamese syllables	i (e.g.: í ới)	
In one-lettered Sino-Vietnamese syllables	y (e.g.: y học)	
Syllable-initial, not followed by ê	i (e.g.: im lặng)	
Syllable-initial, followed by ê	y (e.g.: yết hầu)	
After u	y (e.g.: khuyết tật)	
After qu, not followed by ê, nh	y (e.g.: quý giá)	i (e.g.: quí giá)
After qu, followed by ê, nh	y (e.g.: xảo quyệt)	
After b, d, đ, r, x	i (e.g.: địch thủ)	
After g, not followed by a, ă, â, e, ê, o, ô, ơ, u, ư	i (e.g.: giữ gìn)	
After h, k, l, m, t, not followed by any letter, in non-Sino-Vietnamese syllables	i (e.g.: mí mắt)	
After h, k, l, m, t, not followed by any letter, in Sino-Vietnamese syllables	i (e.g.: kì thú)	y (e.g.: kỳ thú)
After ch, gh, kh, nh, ph, th	i (e.g.: ý nghĩa)	
After n, s, v, not followed by any letter, in non-proper-noun syllables	i (e.g.: ni cô)	
After n, s, v, not followed by any letter, in proper nouns	i (e.g.: Vi)	y (e.g.: Vy)
After h, k, l, m, n, s, t, v, followed by a letter	i (e.g.: ngôi miếu)	
In Vietnamese personal names, after a consonant	i	either i or y, depending on personal preference

This "standard" set by Nhà Xuất bản Giáo dục is not definite. It is unknown why the literature books use Lí while the history books use Lý.

=== Spelling ===
==== Vowel nuclei ====
The table below shows the vowels of Hanoi Vietnamese (written in the IPA) and the corresponding orthographic symbols.

	Front		Central		Back	
	Sound	Spelling	Sound	Spelling	Sound	Spelling
Centering	/iə̯/	iê/ia*	/ɨə̯/	ươ/ưa*	/uə̯/	uô/ua*
Close	/i/	i, y	/ɨ/	ư	/u/	u
Close-mid/ Mid	/e/	ê	/ə/	ơ	/o/	ô
Close-mid/ Mid	/e/	ê	/ə̆/	â	/o/	ô
Open-mid/ Open	/ɛ/	e	/a/	a	/ɔ/	o
Open-mid/ Open	/ɛ/	e	/ă/	ă	/ɔ/	o

Notes:

- The vowel /i/ is:
  - usually written ⟨i⟩: /sǐˀ/ = sĩ (a suffix indicating profession, similar to the English suffix -er).
  - sometimes written ⟨y⟩ after ⟨h⟩, ⟨k⟩, ⟨l⟩, ⟨m⟩, ⟨n⟩, ⟨s⟩, ⟨t⟩, ⟨v⟩, ⟨x⟩: /mǐˀ/ = Mỹ 'America'
  - It is always written ⟨y⟩ when:
    1. preceded by an orthographic vowel: /xwīə̯n/ = khuyên 'to advise';
    2. at the beginning of a word derived from Chinese (written as ⟨i⟩ otherwise): /ʔīə̯w/ = yêu 'to love'.
- The vowel /ɔ/ is written ⟨oo⟩ before ⟨c⟩ or ⟨ng⟩ (since ⟨o⟩ in that position represents /ăw/): /ʔɔ̌k/ = oóc 'organ (musical)'; /kǐŋ kɔ̄ŋ/ = kính coong. This generally only occurs in recent loanwords or when representing dialectal pronunciation.
- Similarly, the vowel /o/ is written ⟨ôô⟩ before ⟨c⟩ or ⟨ng⟩: /ʔōŋ/ = ôông (Nghệ An/Hà Tĩnh variant of ông /ʔə̆̄wŋ/). But unlike ⟨oo⟩ being frequently used in onomatopoeia, transcriptions from other languages and words "borrowed" from Nghệ An/Hà Tĩnh dialects (such as voọc), ⟨ôô⟩ seems to be used solely to convey the feel of the Nghệ An/Hà Tĩnh accents. In transcriptions, ⟨ô⟩ is preferred (e.g. các-tông 'cardboard', ắc-coóc-đê-ông 'accordion').

==== Diphthongs and triphthongs ====
		Rising Vowels	Rising-Falling Vowels	Falling Vowels	
	nucleus (V)	/w/ on-glides	/w/ + V + off-glide	/j/ off-glides	/w/ off-glides
front	e	/wɛ/ oe/(q)ue*	/wɛw/ oeo/(q)ueo*		/ɛw/ eo
front	ê	/we/ uê			/ew/ êu
front	i	/wi/ uy	/wiw/ uyu		/iw/ iu
front	ia/iê/yê*	/wiə̯/ uyê/uya*			/iə̯w/ iêu/yêu*
central	a	/wa/ oa/(q)ua*	/waj/ oai/(q)uai, /waw/ oao/(q)uao*	/aj/ ai	/aw/ ao
central	ă	/wă/ oă/(q)uă*	/wăj/ oay/(q)uay*	/ăj/ ay	/ăw/ au
central	â	/wə̆/ uâ	/wə̆j/ uây	/ə̆j/ ây	/ə̆w/ âu
central	ơ	/wə/ uơ		/əj/ ơi	/əw/ ơu
central	ư			/ɨj/ ưi	/ɨw/ ưu
central	ưa/ươ*			/ɨə̯j/ ươi	/ɨə̯w/ ươu
back	o			/ɔj/ oi	
back	ô			/oj/ ôi	
back	u			/uj/ ui	
back	ua/uô*			/uə̯j/ uôi	

Notes:

The glide /w/ is written:

- ⟨u⟩ after /k/ (spelled ⟨q⟩ in this instance)
- ⟨o⟩ in front of ⟨a⟩, ⟨ă⟩, or ⟨e⟩ except after ⟨q⟩
- ⟨o⟩ following ⟨a⟩ and ⟨e⟩
- ⟨u⟩ in all other cases; /ăw/ is written as ⟨au⟩ instead of *⟨ăw⟩ (cf. ⟨ao⟩ /aw/), and that /i/ is written as ⟨y⟩ after ⟨y⟩

The off-glide /j/ is written as ⟨i⟩ except after ⟨â⟩ and ⟨ă⟩, where it is written as ⟨y⟩; /ăj/ is written as ⟨ay⟩ instead of *⟨ăy⟩ (cf. ai /aj/).

The diphthong /iə̯/ is written:

- ⟨ia⟩ at the end of a syllable: /mǐə̯/ = mía 'sugar cane'
- iê before a consonant or off-glide: /mǐə̯ŋ/ = miếng 'piece'; /sīə̯w/ = xiêu 'to slope, slant'

The ⟨i⟩ of the diphthong changes to ⟨y⟩ after ⟨u⟩:
- ⟨ya⟩: /xwīə̯/ = khuya 'late at night'
- ⟨yê⟩: /xwīə̯n/ = khuyên 'to advise'
⟨iê⟩ changes to ⟨yê⟩ at the beginning of a syllable (⟨ia⟩ does not change):
- /īə̯n/ = yên 'calm'; /ǐə̯w/ yếu 'weak, feeble'

The diphthong /uə̯/ is written:

- ⟨ua⟩ at the end of a syllable: /mūə̯/ = mua 'to buy'
- ⟨uô⟩ before a consonant or off-glide: /mūə̯n/ = muôn 'ten thousand'; /sūə̯j/ = xuôi 'down'

The diphthong /ɨə̯/ is written:

- ⟨ưa⟩ at the end of a syllable: /mɨ̄ə̯/ = mưa 'to rain'
- ⟨ươ⟩ before a consonant or off-glide: /mɨ̄ə̯ŋ/ = mương 'irrigation canal'; /tɨ̌ə̯j/ = tưới 'to water, irrigate, sprinkle'

== Tone marks ==
Vietnamese is a tonal language, so the meaning of each word depends on the pitch in which it is pronounced. Tones are marked in the IPA as suprasegmentals following the phonemic value. Some tones are also associated with a glottalization pattern.

There are six distinct tones in the standard northern dialect. The first one ("level tone") is not marked and the other five are indicated by diacritics applied to the vowel part of the syllable. The tone names are chosen such that the name of each tone is spoken in the tone it identifies.

In the south, there is a merging of the hỏi and ngã tones, in effect leaving five tones.

Order	Diacritic	Symbol	Input keys		Name	IPA diacritic	Vowels with diacritic
Order	Diacritic	Symbol	TELEX	VNI	Name	IPA diacritic	Vowels with diacritic
1	unmarked	N/A	Z*	0*	ngang	mid level, ˧	A/a, Ă/ă, Â/â, E/e, Ê/ê, I/i, O/o, Ô/ô, Ơ/ơ, U/u, Ư/ư, Y/y
2	acute accent	á	S	1	sắc	high rising, ˧˥	Á/á, Ắ/ắ, Ấ/ấ, É/é, Ế/ế, Í/í, Ó/ó, Ố/ố, Ớ/ớ, Ú/ú, Ứ/ứ, Ý/ý
3	grave accent	à	F	2	huyền	low falling, ˨˩	À/à, Ằ/ằ, Ầ/ầ, È/è, Ề/ề, Ì/ì, Ò/ò, Ồ/ồ, Ờ/ờ, Ù/ù, Ừ/ừ, Ỳ/ỳ
4	hook above	ả	R	3	hỏi	mid falling, ˧˩ (Northern); dipping, ˨˩˥ (Southern)	Ả/ả, Ẳ/ẳ, Ẩ/ẩ, Ẻ/ẻ, Ể/ể, Ỉ/ỉ, Ỏ/ỏ, Ổ/ổ, Ở/ở, Ủ/ủ, Ử/ử, Ỷ/ỷ
5	perispomene (Note: Mistakenly encoded in Unicode (and Vietnamese modifications of ISO-8859-1 such as VISCII, VPS or Windows-1258) as the tilde. However, the tilde (in a contemporaneous Portuguese typographical style with a flattened left-hand side) was used for something different in Middle Vietnamese, the so-called Vietnamese apex, while the tone mark was initially equated with the Greek circumflex (i.e. perispomene), despite the "Latin circumflex" also being used for a different purpose as it still is today.)	ã	X	4	ngã	glottalized rising, ˧˥ˀ (Northern); slightly lengthened dấu hỏi tone (Southern)	Ã/ã, Ẵ/ẵ, Ẫ/ẫ, Ẽ/ẽ, Ễ/ễ, Ĩ/ĩ, Õ/õ, Ỗ/ỗ, Ỡ/ỡ, Ũ/ũ, Ữ/ữ, Ỹ/ỹ
6	dot below	ạ	J	5	nặng	glottalized falling, ˧˨ˀ (Northern); low rising, ˩˧ (Southern)	Ạ/ạ, Ặ/ặ, Ậ/ậ, Ẹ/ẹ, Ệ/ệ, Ị/ị, Ọ/ọ, Ộ/ộ, Ợ/ợ, Ụ/ụ, Ự/ự, Ỵ/ỵ

- *: Z (in TELEX) and 0 (in VNI) keys are used to remove the mark. For example, in VNI, U2 → ⟨ù⟩, then press 0 → ⟨u⟩.
- Unmarked vowels are pronounced with a level voice, in the middle of the speaking range.
- The grave accent indicates that the speaker should start somewhat low and drop slightly in tone, with the voice becoming increasingly breathy.
- The hook indicates in Northern Vietnamese that the speaker should start in the middle range and fall, but in Southern Vietnamese that the speaker should start somewhat low and fall, then rise (as when asking a question in English).
- In the North, a perispomene indicates that the speaker should start mid, break off (with a glottal stop), then start again and rise like a question in tone. In the South, it is realized identically to the Hỏi tone.
- The acute accent indicates that the speaker should start mid and rise sharply in tone.
- The dot or cross signifies in Northern Vietnamese that the speaker starts low and fall lower in tone, with the voice becoming increasingly creaky and ending in a glottal stop.

In syllables where the vowel part consists of more than one vowel (such as diphthongs and triphthongs), the placement of the tone is still a matter of debate. Generally, there are two methodologies, an "old style" and a "new style". While the "old style" emphasizes aesthetics by placing the tone mark as close as possible to the center of the word (by placing the tone mark on the last vowel if an ending consonant part exists and on the next-to-last vowel if the ending consonant does not exist, as in hóa, hủy), the "new style" emphasizes linguistic principles and tries to apply the tone mark on the main vowel (as in hoá, huỷ). In both styles, when one vowel already has a quality diacritic on it, the tone mark must be applied to it as well, regardless of where it appears in the syllable (thus thuế is acceptable while *thúê is not). In the case of the ⟨ươ⟩ diphthong, the mark is placed on the ⟨ơ⟩. The ⟨u⟩ in ⟨qu⟩ is considered part of the consonant. Currently, the new style is usually used in textbooks published by Nhà Xuất bản Giáo dục, while most people still prefer the old style in casual uses. Among Overseas Vietnamese communities, the old style is predominant for all purposes.

In lexical ordering, differences in letters are treated as primary, differences in tone markings as secondary and differences in case as tertiary differences. (Letters include for instance ⟨a⟩ and ⟨ă⟩ but not ⟨ẳ⟩. Older dictionaries also treated digraphs and trigraphs like ⟨ch⟩ and ⟨ngh⟩ as base letters.) Ordering according to primary and secondary differences proceeds syllable by syllable. According to this principle, a dictionary lists tuân thủ before tuần chay because the secondary difference in the first syllable takes precedence over the primary difference in the second syllable.

== Structure ==
In the past, syllables in multisyllabic words were concatenated with hyphens, but this practice has died out and hyphenation is now reserved for word-borrowings from other languages. A written syllable consists of at most three parts, in the following order from left to right:

1. An optional beginning consonant part
2. A required vowel syllable nucleus and the tone mark, if needed, applied above or below it
3. An ending consonant part, can only be one of the following: ⟨c⟩, ⟨ch⟩, ⟨m⟩, ⟨n⟩, ⟨ng⟩, ⟨nh⟩, ⟨p⟩, ⟨t⟩, or nothing.

== History ==
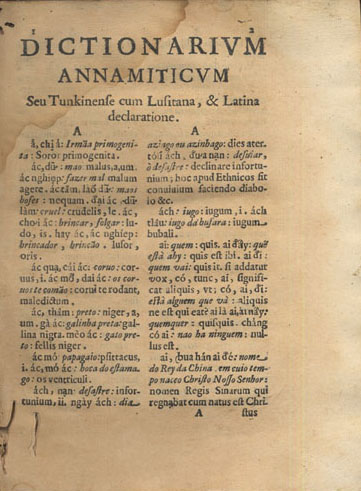
A page from Alexandre de Rhodes' 1651 dictionary

Since the beginning of the Chinese rule (known to Vietnamese historians as "Northern Domination") in 111 BC, Vietnam had been heavily influenced by Chinese culture and its literature, government papers, scholarly works and religious scripture were all written in Literary Chinese ( 漢文, Hán văn) while indigenous writing with chữ Hán started around the ninth century. In the 12th century, several Vietnamese words began to be written in chữ Nôm, which was based on Chinese characters but supplemented with Vietnamese-invented logographic characters made from Chinese character radicals, to represent native Vietnamese words. These characters were adapted or created using methods such as phono-semantic compounds ( 形聲, hình thanh), double-phonetic compounds ( 會音, hội âm), and borrowing the character for its pronunciation ( 假借, giả tá).

=== Name ===
People have called the Latinized script of Vietnamese chữ Quốc ngữ at least since 1867. In 1867, scholar Trương Vĩnh Ký published two grammar books. The first book is Mẹo luật dạy học tiếng pha-lang-sa (Tips to teach and learn French), a Vietnamese book written in chữ Quốc ngữ about French grammar. In this book, the Latinized script of Vietnamese was called chữ quốc ngự (not ngữ). The second book is Abrégé de grammaire annamite (Simplification of Annamite grammar), a French book about Vietnamese grammar. In this book, the Latinized script of Vietnamese was called l'alphabet européen (European alphabet), les caractères latins (Latin characters). On Gia Dinh Bao April 15th issue of 1867, when mentioned the French book about Vietnamese grammar, the name chữ quốc ngữ was used to indicate the Latinized script of Vietnamese. The script was also referred to as chữ Nôm Latinh ('Romanized vernacular') at the First Tonkin Synod in 1900 and the Second Tonkin Synod in 1912.

=== Creation of chữ Quốc ngữ ===
As early as 1620, with the work of Francisco de Pina, Portuguese and Italian Jesuit missionaries in Vietnam began using Latin script to transcribe the Vietnamese language as an assistance for learning the language. The work was continued by the Avignonese Alexandre de Rhodes. Building on previous dictionaries by Gaspar do Amaral and António Barbosa, Rhodes compiled the Dictionarium Annamiticum Lusitanum et Latinum, a Vietnamese–Portuguese–Latin dictionary, which was later printed in Rome in 1651, using their spelling system. These efforts led eventually to the development of the present Vietnamese alphabet. For 200 years, chữ Quốc ngữ was used within the Catholic community. However, works written in the Vietnamese alphabet saw limited use, while Catholic texts in chữ Nôm were significantly more widespread. Chữ Nôm thus remained the principal writing system used by Vietnamese Catholics during this period.

=== Colonial period ===
In 1910, the French colonial administration enforced chữ Quốc ngữ. The Latin alphabet then became a means to publish Vietnamese popular literature, which was disparaged as vulgar by the Chinese-educated imperial elites. Historian Pamela A. Pears asserted that by instituting the Latin alphabet in Vietnam, the French cut the Vietnamese from their traditional Hán Nôm literature. An important reason why Latin script became the standard writing system in Vietnam but not in Cambodia and Laos, which were both dominated by the French for a similar amount of time under the same colonial framework, had to do with the Nguyễn Emperors of Vietnam heavily promoting its usage. According to the historian Liam Kelley in his 2016 work "Emperor Thành Thái’s Educational Revolution" neither the French nor the revolutionaries had enough power to spread the usage of chữ Quốc ngữ down to the village level. It was by the imperial decree of Emperor Thành Thái in 1906 that parents could decide whether their children would follow a curriculum in Hán văn ( 漢文) or Nam âm ( 南音, 'Southern sound', the contemporary Vietnamese name for chữ Quốc ngữ). This decree was issued at the same time when other social changes, such as the cutting of long male hair, were occurring. The main reason for the popularisation of the Latin alphabet in Vietnam/Đại Nam during the Nguyễn dynasty (the French protectorates of Annam and Tonkin) was because of the pioneering efforts by intellectuals from French Cochinchina combined with the progressive and scientific policies of the French government in French Indochina that created the momentum for the usage of chữ Quốc ngữ to spread.

From the first days it was recognized that the Chinese language was a barrier between us and the natives; the education provided by means of the hieroglyphic characters was completely beyond us; this writing makes possible only with difficulty transmitting to the population the diverse ideas which are necessary for them at the level of their new political and commercial situation. Consequently we are obliged to follow the traditions of our own system of education; it is the only one which can bring close to us the Annamites of the colony by inculcating in them the principles of European civilization and isolating them from the hostile influence of our neighbors.

— In a letter dated January 15, 1866, Paulin Vial, Directeur du Cabinet du Gouverneur de la Cochinchine

Since the 1920s, the Vietnamese mostly use chữ Quốc ngữ, and new Vietnamese terms for new items or words are often calqued from Hán Nôm. Some French had originally planned to replace Vietnamese with French, but this never was a serious project, given the small number of French settlers compared with the native population. The French had to reluctantly accept the use of chữ Quốc ngữ to write Vietnamese since this writing system, created by Portuguese missionaries, is based on Portuguese orthography, not French.

==== Mass education ====
Between 1907 and 1908, the short-lived Tonkin Free School promulgated chữ Quốc ngữ and taught French language to the general population.

In 1917, the French system suppressed Vietnam's Confucian examination system, viewed as an aristocratic system linked with the "ancient regime", thereby forcing Vietnamese elites to educate their offspring in the French language education system. While traditional nationalists favoured the Confucian examination system and the use of chữ Hán, Vietnamese revolutionaries, progressive nationalists, and pro-French elites viewed the French education system as a means to "liberate" the Vietnamese from old Chinese domination and the unsatisfactory "outdated" Confucian examination system, to democratize education and to help bridge Vietnamese to European philosophies.

The French colonial system then set up another educational system, teaching Vietnamese as a first language using chữ Quốc ngữ in primary school and then the French language (taught in chữ Quốc ngữ). Hundreds of thousands of textbooks for primary education began to be published in chữ Quốc ngữ, with the unintentional result of turning the script into the popular medium for the expression for Vietnamese culture.

=== Late 20th century to present ===
Typesetting and printing Vietnamese has been challenging due to its number of accents/diacritics. This had led to the use of accent and diacritic-less names in Overseas Vietnamese, such as Viet instead of the proper Việt. Contemporary Vietnamese texts sometimes include words which have not been adapted to modern Vietnamese orthography, especially for documents written in chữ Hán. French, which left a mark on the Vietnamese language in the form of loanwords and other influences, is no longer as widespread in Vietnam, with English or International English the preferred European language for commerce.

==== Computing ====
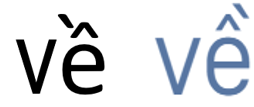
Different ways in which tone marks can be presented on letters that already have diacritic, e.g. (`) on letter ê when computerising Vietnamese

The universal character set Unicode has full support for the Latin Vietnamese writing system, although it does not have a separate segment for it. The required characters that other languages use are scattered throughout the Basic Latin, Latin-1 Supplement, Latin Extended-A and Latin Extended-B blocks; those that remain (such as the letters with dau hoi) are placed in the Latin Extended Additional block. An ASCII-based writing convention, Vietnamese Quoted Readable and several byte-based encodings including VSCII (TCVN), VNI, VISCII and Windows-1258 were widely used before Unicode became popular. Most new documents now exclusively use the Unicode format UTF-8.

Unicode allows the user to choose between precomposed characters and combining characters in inputting Vietnamese. Because in the past some fonts implemented combining characters in a nonstandard way (see Verdana font), most people use precomposed characters when composing Vietnamese-language documents (except on Windows where Windows-1258 used combining characters).

Most keyboards on modern phone and computer operating systems, including iOS, Android and MacOS, have now supported the Vietnamese language and direct input of diacritics by default. Previously, Vietnamese users had to manually install free software such as Unikey on computers or Laban Key on phones to type Vietnamese diacritics. These keyboards support input methods such as Telex.

===== Unicode code points =====
The following table provides Unicode code points for all non-ASCII Vietnamese letters.

Unmarked	Grave	Hook	Perispomeni	Acute	Dot
	̀ (U+0300)	̉ (U+0309)	̃ (U+0303)	́ (U+0301)	̣ (U+0323)
Uppercase letters
A	À (U+00C0)	Ả (U+1EA2)	Ã (U+00C3)	Á (U+00C1)	Ạ (U+1EA0)
Ă (U+0102)	Ằ (U+1EB0)	Ẳ (U+1EB2)	Ẵ (U+1EB4)	Ắ (U+1EAE)	Ặ (U+1EB6)
Â (U+00C2)	Ầ (U+1EA6)	Ẩ (U+1EA8)	Ẫ (U+1EAA)	Ấ (U+1EA4)	Ậ (U+1EAC)
Đ (U+0110)					
E	È (U+00C8)	Ẻ (U+1EBA)	Ẽ (U+1EBC)	É (U+00C9)	Ẹ (U+1EB8)
Ê (U+00CA)	Ề (U+1EC0)	Ể (U+1EC2)	Ễ (U+1EC4)	Ế (U+1EBE)	Ệ (U+1EC6)
I	Ì (U+00CC)	Ỉ (U+1EC8)	Ĩ (U+0128)	Í (U+00CD)	Ị (U+1ECA)
O	Ò (U+00D2)	Ỏ (U+1ECE)	Õ (U+00D5)	Ó (U+00D3)	Ọ (U+1ECC)
Ô (U+00D4)	Ồ (U+1ED2)	Ổ (U+1ED4)	Ỗ (U+1ED6)	Ố (U+1ED0)	Ộ (U+1ED8)
Ơ (U+01A0)	Ờ (U+1EDC)	Ở (U+1EDE)	Ỡ (U+1EE0)	Ớ (U+1EDA)	Ợ (U+1EE2)
U	Ù (U+00D9)	Ủ (U+1EE6)	Ũ (U+0168)	Ú (U+00DA)	Ụ (U+1EE4)
Ư (U+01AF)	Ừ (U+1EEA)	Ử (U+1EEC)	Ữ (U+1EEE)	Ứ (U+1EE8)	Ự (U+1EF0)
Y	Ỳ (U+1EF2)	Ỷ (U+1EF6)	Ỹ (U+1EF8)	Ý (U+00DD)	Ỵ (U+1EF4)
Lowercase letters
a	à (U+00E0)	ả (U+1EA3)	ã (U+00E3)	á (U+00E1)	ạ (U+1EA1)
ă (U+0103)	ằ (U+1EB1)	ẳ (U+1EB3)	ẵ (U+1EB5)	ắ (U+1EAF)	ặ (U+1EB7)
â (U+00E2)	ầ (U+1EA7)	ẩ (U+1EA9)	ẫ (U+1EAB)	ấ (U+1EA5)	ậ (U+1EAD)
đ (U+0111)					
e	è (U+00E8)	ẻ (U+1EBB)	ẽ (U+1EBD)	é (U+00E9)	ẹ (U+1EB9)
ê (U+00EA)	ề (U+1EC1)	ể (U+1EC3)	ễ (U+1EC5)	ế (U+1EBF)	ệ (U+1EC7)
i	ì (U+00EC)	ỉ (U+1EC9)	ĩ (U+0129)	í (U+00ED)	ị (U+1ECB)
o	ò (U+00F2)	ỏ (U+1ECF)	õ (U+00F5)	ó (U+00F3)	ọ (U+1ECD)
ô (U+00F4)	ồ (U+1ED3)	ổ (U+1ED5)	ỗ (U+1ED7)	ố (U+1ED1)	ộ (U+1ED9)
ơ (U+01A1)	ờ (U+1EDD)	ở (U+1EDF)	ỡ (U+1EE1)	ớ (U+1EDB)	ợ (U+1EE3)
u	ù (U+00F9)	ủ (U+1EE7)	ũ (U+0169)	ú (U+00FA)	ụ (U+1EE5)
ư (U+01B0)	ừ (U+1EEB)	ử (U+1EED)	ữ (U+1EEF)	ứ (U+1EE9)	ự (U+1EF1)
y	ỳ (U+1EF3)	ỷ (U+1EF7)	ỹ (U+1EF9)	ý (U+00FD)	ỵ (U+1EF5)

== See also ==
- Portuguese orthography
- Special characters:
  - Ă, Â, Đ, Ê, Ô, Ơ, Ư
  - Dot (diacritic)
  - Hook above
- Historic writing
  - "Chữ Hán", classical Chinese written in Vietnam (Han characters)
  - "Chữ Nôm", former script used to write Vietnamese using Han and Nom (invented characters) words
- Coding and input methods:
  - Telex, the oldest standard input method for the Vietnamese alphabet on electronic devices.
  - VNI, another input and encoding convention for Vietnamese alphabet.
  - VIQR, another standard 7-bit input method for Vietnamese alphabet.
  - VISCII, another standard 8-bit encoding for Vietnamese alphabet.
  - Unicode, character encoding standard for most of the world's writing systems
- Vietnamese Braille
- Vietnamese calligraphy
- Vietnamese phonology
- Vietnamese punctuation
- Francisco de Pina
- Alexandre de Rhodes

== Bibliography ==
- Gregerson, Kenneth J. (1969). A study of Middle Vietnamese phonology. Bulletin de la Société des Etudes Indochinoises, 44, 135–193. (Published version of the author's MA thesis, University of Washington). (Reprinted 1981, Dallas: Summer Institute of Linguistics).
- Haudricourt, André-Georges (2010) [1949]. "Origine des particularités de l'alphabet vietnamien" [The origin of the peculiarities of the Vietnamese alphabet] (PDF). Dân Việt-Nam (3): 61–68.
- Healy, Dana.(2003). Teach Yourself Vietnamese, Hodder Education, London.
- Kornicki, Peter (2017), "Sino-Vietnamese literature", in Li, Wai-yee; Denecke, Wiebke; Tian, Xiaofen (eds.), The Oxford Handbook of Classical Chinese Literature (1000 BCE-900 CE), Oxford: Oxford University Press, pp. 568–578, ISBN 978-0-199-35659-1.
- Li, Yu (2020). The Chinese Writing System in Asia: An Interdisciplinary Perspective. Routledge. ISBN 978-1-00-069906-7.
- Nguyen, Đang Liêm. (1970). Vietnamese pronunciation. PALI language texts: Southeast Asia. Honolulu: University of Hawaii Press. ISBN 0-87022-462-X.
- Nguyễn, Đình-Hoà. (1955). Quốc-ngữ: The modern writing system in Vietnam. Washington, D. C.: Author.
- Nguyễn, Đình-Hoà (1992). "Vietnamese phonology and graphemic borrowings from Chinese: The Book of 3,000 Characters revisited". Mon-Khmer Studies. 20: 163–182.
- Nguyễn, Đình-Hoà. (1996). Vietnamese. In P. T. Daniels, & W. Bright (Eds.), The world's writing systems, (pp. 691–699). New York: Oxford University Press. ISBN 0-19-507993-0.
- Nguyễn, Đình-Hoà. (1997). Vietnamese: Tiếng Việt không son phấn. Amsterdam: John Benjamins Publishing Company. ISBN 1-55619-733-0.
- Pham, Andrea Hoa. (2003). Vietnamese tone: A new analysis. Outstanding dissertations in linguistics. New York: Routledge. (Published version of author's 2001 PhD dissertation, University of Florida: Hoa, Pham. Vietnamese tone: Tone is not pitch). ISBN 0-415-96762-7.
- Phạm, Thị Kiều Ly (2022). Histoire de l'écriture romanisée du vietnamien (1615−1919). Les Indes savantes. ISBN 9782846546164.
- Sassoon, Rosemary (1995). The Acquisition of a Second Writing System (illustrated, reprint ed.). Intellect Books. ISBN 1871516439.
- Thompson, Laurence E. (1991). A Vietnamese reference grammar. Seattle: University of Washington Press. Honolulu: University of Hawaii Press. ISBN 0-8248-1117-8. (Original work published 1965).
- Tran, Anh Q. (2022). "Catholicism and the Development of the Vietnamese Alphabet, 1620–1898". Journal of Vietnamese Studies. 17 (2–3): 9–37. doi:10.1525/vs.2022.17.2-3.9.
- Wellisch, Hans H. (1978). The conversion of scripts, its nature, history and utilization. Information sciences series (illustrated ed.). Wiley. ISBN 0471016209.
