= Vietnamese Professionals Society =

The Vietnamese Professionals Society (abbreviated VPS; Vietnamese: Hội Chuyên gia Việt Nam) is a non-profit worldwide membership organization of Vietnamese professionals of various technical, economic, medical, legal fields. Its mission is to increase the knowledge and understanding of the social and economic conditions in Vietnam, to promote the welfare of the Vietnamese people. VPS is most famous for its Vietnamese accent marks software VPSKeys.

== History ==
VPS was founded in 1990 and now has more than 25 chapters worldwide.

== Conferences ==
VPS regularly organizes regional conferences in each continent, gathering Vietnamese as well as non-Vietnamese experts to present their latest research and/or conduct workshops for the Vietnamese community.

== Television show ==
The Southern California chapter of VPS produced a short-lived technical television show on Saigon Broadcasting Television Network (SBTN) named Diễn Đàn Khoa Học (Science Forum). The Vietnamese 30-minute show was hosted by VPS Southern California members Holly Ngo, Kenneth Dao and Minh T. Nguyen. The show aired in 2004 and concentrated on professional topics ranging from computers, law and health to economy, finance and many other professional topics that relate to the Vietnamese community. Due to time constraints by the co-hosts, the show discontinued in 2004 after 20 episodes.
