= Vietnamese Quoted-Readable =

Vietnamese Quoted-Readable (usually abbreviated VIQR), also known as Vietnet, is a convention devised in 1992 for writing Vietnamese using ASCII characters encoded in only seven bits, making it possible for computing and communication systems of the time to support Vietnamese text. Because the Vietnamese alphabet contains a complex system of diacritical marks, VIQR requires the user to type in a base letter, followed by one or two characters that represent the diacritical marks.

== Syntax ==
VIQR uses the following convention:

Diacritical marks in VIQR
Diacritical mark	Typed character	Examples
trăng (breve)	(	a( → ă
mũ (circumflex)	^	a^ → â
móc (horn)	+	o+ → ơ
huyền (grave)	`	a` → à
sắc (acute)	'	a' → á
hỏi (hook)	?	a? → ả
ngã (tilde)	~	a~ → ã
nặng (dot below)	.	a. → ạ

VIQR uses DD or Dd for the Vietnamese letter Đ, and dd for the Vietnamese letter đ. To type certain punctuation marks (namely, the period, question mark, apostrophe, forward slash, opening parenthesis, or tilde) directly after most Vietnamese words, a backslash (\) must be typed directly before the punctuation mark, functioning as an escape character, so that it will not be interpreted as a diacritical mark. For example:

O^ng te^n gi`\? To^i te^n la` Tra^`n Va(n Hie^'u\.
Ông tên gì? Tôi tên là Trần Văn Hiếu.

What is your name [Sir]? My name is Trần Văn Hiếu.

== Software support ==
VIQR is primarily used as a Vietnamese input method in software that supports Unicode. Similar input methods include Telex and VNI. Input method editors such as VPSKeys convert VIQR sequences to Unicode precomposed characters as one types, typically allowing modifier keys to be input after all the base letters of each word. However, in the absence of input method software or Unicode support, VIQR can still be input using a standard keyboard and read as plain ASCII text without suffering from mojibake.

Unlike the VISCII and VPS code pages, VIQR is rarely used as a character encoding. While VIQR is registered with the Internet Assigned Numbers Authority as a MIME charset, MIME-compliant software is not required to support it. Nevertheless, the Mozilla Vietnamese Enabling Project once produced builds of the open source version of Netscape Communicator, as well as its successor, the Mozilla Application Suite, that were capable of decoding VIQR-encoded webpages, e-mails, and newsgroup messages. In these unofficial builds, a "VIQR" option appears in the Edit | Character Set menu, alongside the VISCII, TCVN 5712, VPS, and Windows-1258 options that remained available for several years in Mozilla Firefox and Thunderbird.

== History ==
By the early 1990s, an ad-hoc system of mnemonics known as Vietnet was in use on the Viet-Net mailing list and soc.culture.vietnamese Usenet group.

In 1992, the Vietnamese Standardization Group (Viet-Std, Nhóm Nghiên Cứu Tiêu Chuẩn Tiếng Việt) from the TriChlor Software Group led by Christopher Cuong T. Nguyen, Cuong M. Bui, and Hoc D. Ngo in California formalized the VIQR convention. It was described the next year in RFC 1456.

== See also ==
- Vietnamese language and computers

Alternative schemes for Vietnamese:

- Telex
- VISCII
- VNI
- VPSKeys
- VSCII-MNEM

ASCII mnemonics for other writing systems:

- ITRANS for Devanagari
- SAMPA for IPA
