= Windows-1258 =

Windows character set for Vietnamese

- MIME / IANA: windows-1258
- Alias(es): cp1258 (Code page 1258)
- Languages: Vietnamese, English, French, German, Spanish, Danish, Norwegian, Swedish, Finnish, Irish, Albanian, Luxembourgish, Dutch. With combining diacritics: Asturian, Estonian, Italian, Portuguese, Sicilian, Guarani, Igbo, Marshallese (MOD), Nauruan, Yoruba
- Created by: Microsoft
- Standard: WHATWG Encoding Standard
- Classification: extended ASCII, Windows-125x
- Based on: Windows-1252

Windows-1258 is a code page used in Microsoft Windows to represent Vietnamese texts. It makes use of combining diacritical marks.

Windows-1258 is compatible with neither the Vietnamese standard (TCVN 5712 / VSCII), nor the various other encodings in use in practice (VISCII, VNI, VPS). Rather, it is very similar to Windows-1252, with the differences being that s-caron and z-caron (which were added to Windows-1252 later) are missing, five of the letters with diacritics have been replaced by combining diacritics for Vietnamese tone marks, one has been replaced with the đông sign, and eight others (four per case) have been changed to four otherwise-unsupported Vietnamese letters.

Use of combining diacritics means that Windows-1258 can cover the large number of combinations of letters and tone marks in Vietnamese without compromising coverage of control codes or symbols. However it also means that software must be careful to handle conversions between precomposed characters and combining sequences correctly when converting to/from other encodings and makes determining user-visible length of a string more difficult.

IBM uses code page 1258 (CCSID 1258 and euro sign extended CCSID 5354) for Windows-1258.

UTF-8 is the preferred encoding for Vietnamese in modern applications. Windows-1258 may not always round-trip Unicode encoded Vietnamese due to changes caused by Unicode normalization. Combining diacritics are encoded after the letter in both Windows-1258 and Unicode (like VNI, unlike ANSEL).

== Character set ==
The following table shows Windows-1258. Each character is shown with its Unicode equivalent.

Windows-1258
	0	1	2	3	4	5	6	7	8	9	A	B	C	D	E	F
0x	NUL	SOH	STX	ETX	EOT	ENQ	ACK	BEL	BS	HT	LF	VT	FF	CR	SO	SI
1x	DLE	DC1	DC2	DC3	DC4	NAK	SYN	ETB	CAN	EM	SUB	ESC	FS	GS	RS	US
2x	SP	!	"	#	$	%	&	'	(	)	*	+	,	-	.	/
3x	0	1	2	3	4	5	6	7	8	9	:	;	<	=	>	?
4x	@	A	B	C	D	E	F	G	H	I	J	K	L	M	N	O
5x	P	Q	R	S	T	U	V	W	X	Y	Z	[	\	]		_
6x	`	a	b	c	d	e	f	g	h	i	j	k	l	m	n	o
7x	p	q	r	s	t	u	v	w	x	y	z	{	|	}	~	DEL
8x	€		‚	ƒ	„	…	†	‡	ˆ	‰		‹	Œ			
9x		‘	’	“	”	•	–	—	˜	™		›	œ			Ÿ
Ax	NBSP	¡	¢	£	¤	¥	¦	§	¨	©	ª	«	¬	SHY	®	¯
Bx	°	±	²	³	´	µ	¶	·	¸	¹	º	»	¼	½	¾	¿
Cx	À	Á	Â	Ă	Ä	Å	Æ	Ç	È	É	Ê	Ë	◌̀	Í	Î	Ï
Dx	Đ	Ñ	◌̉	Ó	Ô	Ơ	Ö	×	Ø	Ù	Ú	Û	Ü	Ư	◌̃	ß
Ex	à	á	â	ă	ä	å	æ	ç	è	é	ê	ë	◌́	í	î	ï
Fx	đ	ñ	◌̣	ó	ô	ơ	ö	÷	ø	ù	ú	û	ü	ư	₫	ÿ
Differences from Windows-1252

== Code page 1129 ==
IBM's code page 1129 (CCSID 1129 and euro sign extended CCSID 1163) is similar to code page 1258, but with the following differences:

Code page 1129 (differences from code page 1258)
	0	1	2	3	4	5	6	7	8	9	A	B	C	D	E	F
8x																
9x																
Ax	NBSP	¡	¢	£	¤	¥	¦	§	œ	©	ª	«	¬	SHY	®	¯
Bx	°	±	²	³	Ÿ	µ	¶	·	Œ	¹	º	»	¼	½	¾	¿
Differences from Windows-1258

== See also ==
- VSCII
- VISCII
- VNI Character Set
- VPS character encoding
