= VNI (molecule) =

Names
- Preferred IUPAC name N-[(1R)-1-(3,5-Dichlorophenyl)-2-(1H-imidazol-1-yl)ethyl]-4-(5-phenyl-1,3,4-oxadiazol-2-yl)benzamide

Identifiers
CAS Number	1246770-52-4
3D model (JSmol)	Interactive image
ChEMBL	ChEMBL1236677
ChemSpider	25060282
PubChem CID	49867823
UNII	L8Q2ZC3ULE
CompTox Dashboard (EPA)	DTXSID101045347
- InChI: InChI=1S/C26H19Cl2N5O2/c27-20-10-11-21(22(28)14-20)23(15-33-13-12-29-16-33)30-24(34)17-6-8-19(9-7-17)26-32-31-25(35-26)18-4-2-1-3-5-18/h1-14,16,23H,15H2,(H,30,34)/t23-/m0/s1 Key: CJPLMXOWZZCYHJ-QHCPKHFHSA-N; InChI=1/C26H19Cl2N5O2/c27-20-10-11-21(22(28)14-20)23(15-33-13-12-29-16-33)30-24(34)17-6-8-19(9-7-17)26-32-31-25(35-26)18-4-2-1-3-5-18/h1-14,16,23H,15H2,(H,30,34)/t23-/m0/s1 Key: CJPLMXOWZZCYHJ-QHCPKHFHBZ
- SMILES: c1ccc(cc1)c2nnc(o2)c3ccc(cc3)C(=O)N[C@@H](Cn4ccnc4)c5ccc(cc5Cl)Cl

Properties
Chemical formula	C_{26}H_{19}Cl_{2}N_{5}O_{2}
Molar mass	504.37 g·mol^{−1}
- Except where otherwise noted, data are given for materials in their standard state (at 25 °C [77 °F], 100 kPa). Infobox references

VNI is an experimental drug for treating Chagas disease currently being studied at Vanderbilt University. The molecule acts by inhibiting Trypanosoma cruzi sterol 14α-desmethylase activity in vitro. It exhibits no toxicity in mouse cells and, unlike the related compounds posaconazole and fluconazole, increasing the dose is not required to maintain anti-parasitic activity.

According to the researchers, "VNI cures the acute and chronic forms of Chagas disease in mice, with 100% survival and no observable side effects. Low cost (<$0.10/mg), oral bioavailability, favorable pharmacokinetics, and low toxicity make this compound an exceptional candidate for clinical trials. The efficacy of VNI provides additional compelling support for efficacious antiparasitic treatment of chronic Chagas disease, further validating CYP51 as a viable drug targeting T. cruzi, and it opens a new opportunity for therapeutic cure of patients. Although widespread searches for other new drugs that target T. cruzi are surely being pursued, there are millions of patients with this debilitating illness who need immediate therapy, and VNI or a derivative might fulfill this need."
