= Bach Khoa University =

Bach Khoa University or Bachkhoa University may refer to:

- Hanoi University of Science and Technology in Hanoi, Vietnam
- Ho Chi Minh City University of Technology in Ho Chi Minh City, Vietnam
- Da Nang University of Technology in Da Nang, Vietnam
