= VPSKeys =

Freeware input method editor

VPSKeys is a discontinued freeware input method editor developed and distributed by the Vietnamese Professionals Society (VPS). One of the first input method editors for Vietnamese, it allows users to add accent marks to Vietnamese text on computers running Microsoft Windows. The first version of VPSKeys, supporting Windows 3.1, was released in 1993. The last version is 4.3, released in October 2007.

== Features ==
VPSKeys supports the Telex, VISCII, VNI, and VIQR input methods, as well as a number of character encodings. One of its unique features is a "hook/tilde dictionary" (Tự Điển Hỏi Ngã), which provides spelling suggestions for distinguishing words with hỏi or ngã tones. This feature is helpful for speakers of dialects in which these two tones have merged.

== VPS character encoding ==
VPS encoding
- Alias(es): x-viet-vps
- Languages: Vietnamese, English
- Classification: 8-bit SBCS
- Based on: ASCII

The "VPS" character encoding for writing Vietnamese replaces several control characters, including several C0 control characters, with letters while including the ASCII graphical characters unmodified, a similar approach to VSCII-1 (TCVN1) and VISCII.

VPS Encoding
| | 0 | 1 | 2 | 3 | 4 | 5 | 6 | 7 | 8 | 9 | A | B | C | D | E | F |
|---|---|---|---|---|---|---|---|---|---|---|---|---|---|---|---|---|
| 0x | NUL | SOH | Ạ 1EA0 | Ậ 1EAC | Ặ 1EB6 | Ẹ 1EB8 | Ệ 1EC6 | BEL | BS | HT | LF | VT | FF | CR | SO | SI |
| 1x | Ị 1ECA | Ọ 1ECC | Ộ 1ED8 | Ợ 1EE2 | Ụ 1EE4 | Ự 1EF0 | SYN | ETB | CAN | Ỵ 1EF4 | SUB | ESC | Ẫ 1EAA | Ữ 1EEE | RS | US |
| 2x | SP | ! | " | | $ | % | & | ' | ( | ) | | + | , | - | . | / |
| 3x | 0 | 1 | 2 | 3 | 4 | 5 | 6 | 7 | 8 | 9 | : | ; | < | = | > | ? |
| 4x | @ | A | B | C | D | E | F | G | H | I | J | K | L | M | N | O |
| 5x | P | Q | R | S | T | U | V | W | X | Y | Z | [ | \ | ] | ^ | _ |
| 6x | ` | a | b | c | d | e | f | g | h | i | j | k | l | m | n | o |
| 7x | p | q | r | s | t | u | v | w | x | y | z | { | | | } | ~ | DEL |
| 8x | À 00C0 | Ả 1EA2 | Ã 00C3 | Ấ 1EA4 | Ầ 1EA6 | Ẩ 1EA8 | ọ 1ECD | ỗ 1ED7 | Ă 0102 | ế 1EBF | ề 1EC1 | ể 1EC3 | ệ 1EC7 | Ắ 1EAE | Ằ 1EB0 | Ẳ 1EB2 |
| 9x | Ế 1EBE | ‘ 2018 | ’ 2019 | Ề 1EC0 | Ể 1EC2 | Ễ 1EC4 | Ố 1ED0 | Ồ 1ED2 | Ổ 1ED4 | Ỗ 1ED6 | ý 00FD | ỷ 1EF7 | ỵ 1EF5 | Ớ 1EDA | Ờ 1EDC | Ở 1EDE |
| Ax | NBSP | ắ 1EAF | ằ 1EB1 | ẳ 1EB3 | ẵ 1EB5 | ặ 1EB7 | Ỡ 1EE0 | ớ 1EDB | Ù 00D9 | ờ 1EDD | ở 1EDF | ỡ 1EE1 | Ũ 0168 | Ứ 1EE8 | ợ 1EE3 | Ừ 1EEA |
| Bx | ổ 1ED5 | Ử 1EEC | Ỳ 1EF2 | Ỹ 1EF8 | Í 00CD | Ì 00CC | ộ 1ED9 | Ỉ 1EC8 | Ĩ 0128 | Ó 00D3 | ử 1EED | ữ 1EEF | Ò 00D2 | Ỏ 1ECE | Õ 00D5 | ự 1EF1 |
| Cx | ầ 1EA7 | Á | Â | ấ 1EA5 | ẩ 1EA9 | ẫ 1EAB | ậ 1EAD | đ 0111 | ẻ 1EBB | É | Ê | ẹ 1EB9 | ỉ 1EC9 | ễ 1EC5 | ị 1ECB | ỹ 1EF9 |
| Dx | Ư 01AF | Ủ 1EE6 | ồ 1ED3 | ố 1ED1 | Ô | ỏ 1ECF | ơ 01A1 | È 00C8 | ừ 1EEB | ứ 1EE9 | Ú | ũ 0169 | ư 01B0 | Ý | Ẻ 1EBA | ß |
| Ex | à | á | â | ã | ả 1EA3 | ạ 1EA1 | ă 0103 | ç | è | é | ê | ẽ 1EBD | ì | í | î | ĩ 0129 |
| Fx | Ẵ 1EB4 | Đ 0110 | ò | ó | ô | õ | ö | Ơ 01A0 | ụ 1EE5 | ù | ú | ủ 1EE7 | ü | Ỷ 1EF6 | Ẽ 1EBC | ỳ 1EF3 |

== Trojan incident ==
In March 2010, Google and McAfee announced on their security blogs that they believe that hackers compromised the VPS website and replaced the program with a trojan. The trojan, which McAfee has code-named W32/VulcanBot, creates a botnet that could be used to launch distributed denial of service attacks on websites critical of the Vietnamese government's plan to mine bauxite in the country's Central Highlands. McAfee suspects that the authors of the trojan have ties to the Vietnamese government. However, Nguyễn Tử Quảng of Bách Khoa Internet Security (Bkis) called McAfee's accusation "somewhat premature". The Vietnamese Ministry of Foreign Affairs issued a statement calling Google's and McAfee's comments "groundless".

VPS discovered a breach on their website on January 22, 2010, and restored the non-infected software then, but did not publicize it widely because they did not realize the serious nature of the matter.
