= Catamount Library Network =

Public library consortium in Vermont, U.S.

- Logo of the Catamount Library Network
- Abbreviation: CLN
- Purpose: Library Consortium
- Services: Unified library catalog & Library resource sharing
- President: Lynne Fonteneau-McCann
- Vice President: Mary Kasamatsu
- Secretary: Holly Hall
- Treasurer: Jill Tofferi
- Board of directors: Lynne Fonteneau-McCann, Holly Hall, Deb Higgins, Mary Kasamatsu, Jill Tofferi
- Website: http://www.catamountlibraries.org

The Catamount Library Network (CLN) is a consortium of public libraries in the U.S. State of Vermont. It provides a unified library catalog using the open source, Koha integrated library system.

== Organization ==
The Catamount Library Network is incorporated as a 501(c)(3) organization, governed by a 5-member board, chosen by a council composed of one representative from each member library, and officers (president, vice president, secretary, and treasurer), chosen by the board. The council also sets the CLN's annual budget and membership fees, and approves any bylaw changes.

In addition, two groups have been established with representatives from each library, to address, respectively, cataloging and circulation & loans issues arising within the CLN.

== History and current status ==
The development and planning of The Catamount Library Network (CLN) began in 2010 with an initial 5 member libraries, with seed money, initial consultation, and support provided by the Vermont Department of Libraries. The Department of Libraries withdrew most of its assistance over several months in 2015.

The primary motivation for forming the organization was cost savings from switching from proprietary to open source software, and by having one shared system (as opposed to each library maintaining, and paying for, its own separate system). Additionally, a unified catalog allows easier resource sharing between libraries.

Initially, the CLN planned to use the Evergreen Integrated Library System, but later selected Koha as its ILS.

The first 5 libraries switched to the new system in the spring and summer of 2013. An additional 12 libraries have since joined the organization, 9 of which, have added their holdings to the unified catalog. 3 other libraries are currently in various stages of preparation.

One library, Lawrence Memorial Library in Bristol, VT initially joined, but left before being added to the consortium's catalog. It has since joined VOKAL instead. As a result of concern over unrecovered transition costs from Lawrence Memorial leaving CLN, the board voted on September 22, 2014, to require new members to pay a non-refundable deposit of $350(US).

The CLN continues to seek additional members.

== Database hosting ==
The Catamount Library Network's common Koha database and software are hosted by ByWater Solutions.

== VOKAL (The Vermont Organization of Koha Automated Libraries) ==
There is currently one other unified public library catalog in Vermont—VOKAL (The Vermont Organization of Koha Automated Libraries), established by the Green Mountain Library Consortium, and (like CLN), hosted by ByWater Solutions.

== CLN Member libraries (current and former) ==
Library	Website	Location	Time the library was, or will be, added to joint CLN catalog
Founding members
Brooks Memorial Library	http://brookslibraryvt.org	Brattleboro, VT	added May, 2013
Fletcher Memorial Library	http://www.fmlnews.org	Ludlow, VT	added September, 2013
Rutland Free Library	http://rutlandfree.org	Rutland, VT	added September, 2013
Springfield Town Library	http://www.springfieldtownlibrary.org	Springfield, VT	added July, 2013
Waterbury Public Library	http://waterburypubliclibrary.com	Waterbury, VT	added July, 2013
New members added to the system (currently part of the joint catalog)
Ainsworth Public Library	http://ainsworthpubliclibrary.wordpress.com	Williamstown, VT	added May 2015
Bennington Free Library	http://benningtonfreelibrary.org	Bennington, VT	added January, 2014
Deborah Rawson Memorial Library	http://www.drml.org	Jericho, VT	added October, 2014
Guilford Free Library	http://homepages.sover.net/~wilken/guilfordlibrary/	Guilford, VT	added September, 2015
John G. McCullough Free Library	https://mcculloughlibrary.org/	North Bennington, VT	added March, 2017
Morristown Centennial Library	http://centenniallibrary.org	Morristown, VT	added September, 2014
Norman Williams Public Library	http://normanwilliams.org/	Woodstock, VT	
Royalton Memorial Library	http://www.royaltonlibrary.org	South Royalton, VT	added December, 2014
Starksboro Public Library	http://starksborolibrary.wordpress.com	Starksboro, VT	added January, 2015
West Rutland Public Library	http://westrutlandpubliclibrary.weebly.com/	West Rutland, VT	
Members currently in preparation (not yet part of the joint catalog)
H.F. Brigham Library	https://hfbrighamlibrary.wordpress.com/	Bakersfield, VT	
Reading Public Library	http://readinglibrary.org/	Reading, VT	
Former members
Lawrence Memorial Library	http://www.lawrencelibrary.net/	Bristol, VT	Left CLN before being added to the catalog
