= Vermont Organization of Koha Automated Libraries =

U.S. state library organization

The Vermont Organization of Koha Automated Libraries
- Abbreviation: VOKAL
- Services: Unified library catalog and circulation system
- Parent organization: Green Mountain Library Consortium
- Website: http://www.gmlc.org/

The Vermont Organization of Koha Automated Libraries (VOKAL) is an organization of libraries in the U.S. State of Vermont. It provides a unified, online library catalog using the open source, Koha integrated library system. It was established as a part of the Green Mountain Library Consortium.

== History ==
The Vermont Organization of Koha Automated Libraries had its earliest beginnings in the fall of 2007, when several Vermont libraries, using Follett Co.'s Destiny Integrated Library System(ILS) (with the help of the Vermont Department of Libraries), began looking at open source alternatives.

In September 2010, the first libraries began being added to the VOKAL catalog.

== Current status ==
As of February 2016, it had grown to 57 member libraries (55 public libraries, 1 school library, and 1 church library).

VOKAL's catalog also allows users to search Listen Up Vermont (http://www.listenupvermont.org), a shared database of lendable e-books and audiobooks, also operated by the Green Mountain Library Consortium. In addition, VOKAL's catalog also allows users to search the Project Gutenberg Archive, and download its items.

== Database hosting ==
VOKAL's common Koha database and software are hosted by ByWater Solutions.

== Catamount Library Network ==
There is currently one other unified public library catalog in Vermont, the Catamount Library Network, also hosted by ByWater Solutions.

== Member libraries ==
Total number of members: 57

Library	Library Type	Location	Website	Date Added
Arvin A. Brown Public Library	Public	Richford, VT	http://aabrown.org/	2011-06-06
Baldwin Memorial Library	Public	Wells River, VT	https://baldwinmemoriallibrary.wordpress.com/	2012
Bent Northrop Memorial Library	Public	Fairfield, VT	http://www.bentnorthrop.org/	2011-03-01
Blake Memorial Library	Public	East Corinth, VT	http://www.blakememorial.org/	
Bradford Public Library	Public	Bradford, VT	http://bradfordvtlibrary.org/	2012-12-10
Brown Public Library	Public	Northfield, VT	http://www.brownpubliclibrary.org/	2011-05-16
Brownell Library	Public	Essex Jct., VT	http://www.brownelllibrary.org/	2010-09-27
Burnham Memorial Library	Public	Colchester, VT	http://colchestervt.gov/Library/	2011-02-14
Calef Memorial Library	Public	Washington, VT	http://caleflibrary.com/	
Carpenter-Carse Library	Public	Hinesburg, VT	http://www.carpentercarse.org/	2011-08-01
Charlotte Library	Public	Charlotte, VT	http://charlottepubliclibrary.org/	2011-09-12
Chelsea Public Library	Public	Chelsea, VT	http://www.chelsealibrary.com/	2012-11-12
Dorothy Alling Memorial Library	Public	Williston, VT	http://www.williston.lib.vt.us/	2010-11-15
Enosburg Public Library	Public	Enosburg Falls, VT	http://enosburghlibrary.net/	2012-11-06
Essex Free Library	Public	Essex, VT	http://www.essex.org/index.asp?Type=B_BASIC&SEC=%7B7184EFBC-C919-43DF-8515-885060313675%7D	
Fair Haven Free Library	Public	Fair Haven, VT	http://fairhavenfree.org/	
Fairlee Public Library	Public	Fairlee, VT	http://www.fairleelibrary.com/	2011-10-10
Gilbert Hart Library	Public	Wallingford, VT	http://www.wallingfordvt.com/community/gilbert-hart-library/	2012-01-23
Groton Free Public Library	Public	Groton, VT	http://grotonlibraryvt.org/	
Hartford Public Library	Public	Hartford, VT	http://www.hartfordvtlibrary.org/	2012-12-17
Hartland Public Library	Public	Hartland, VT	http://www.hartlandlibraryvt.org/	2013-05-13
Haston Library	Public	Franklin, VT	https://hastonlibrary.wordpress.com/	2013-05-13
Highgate Public Library	Public	Highgate, VT	https://highgatelibrary.wordpress.com/	
Huntington Public Library	Public	Huntington, VT	https://sites.google.com/site/huntingtonvtlibrary/	2012-02-13
Ilsley Public Library	Public	Middlebury, VT	http://www.ilsleypubliclibrary.org/	
Jericho Town Library	Public	Jericho Center, VT	http://www.jerichotownlibraryvt.org/	2011-01-03
Johnson Public Library	Public	Johnson, VT	https://johnsonpubliclibrary.wordpress.com/	2011-02-11
Joslin Memorial Library	Public	Waitsfield, VT	http://www.joslinmemoriallibrary.com/	2011-04-02
Lanpher Memorial Library	Public	Hyde Park, VT	http://www.lanpherlibrary.org/	2011-04-18
Lawrence Memorial Library	Public	Bristol, VT	http://www.lawrencelibrary.net/	
Maclure Library	Public	Pittsford, VT	http://www.maclurelibrary.org/	
Marlboro Elementary School Library	School	Marlboro, VT	http://marlboroschool.net/library	2010-10-25
Milton Public Library	Public	Milton, VT	http://www.miltonlibraryvt.org/	2011-10-24
Montgomery Town Library	Public	Montgomery, VT	https://mtlvermont.wordpress.com/	
Moretown Memorial Library	Public	Moretown, VT	https://web.archive.org/web/20151210181935/http://www.moretownvt.org/moretown-library/	
New Haven Community Library	Public	New Haven, VT	http://www.nhcl.org/	
Norwich Public Library	Public	Norwich, VT	http://www.norwichlibrary.org/	2011-06-20
Pawlet Public Library	Public	Pawlet, VT	https://pawletpubliclibrary.wordpress.com/	2012-01-30
Pierson Library	Public	Shelburne, VT	http://www.piersonlibrary.org/	2011-04-25
Quechee Library	Public	Quechee, VT	http://www.quecheeandwilderlibraries.com/home/?page_id=2	
Richmond Free Library	Public	Richmond, VT	http://richmondfreelibraryvt.org/	2011-05-09
Rockingham Free Public Library	Public	Bellows Falls, VT	http://rockinghamlibrary.org/	
Roxbury Free Library	Public	Roxbury, VT	http://roxburyfreelibrary.org/	2013-05-01
St. Albans Free Library	Public	St. Albans, VT	http://www.stalbansfreelibrary.org/	2013-01-14
St. Johnsbury Athenaeum	Public	St. Johnsbury, VT	http://www.stjathenaeum.org/	2011-12-05
Stowe Free Library	Public	Stowe, VT	http://www.stowelibrary.org/	
Tenney Memorial Library	Public	Newbury, VT	http://tenneymemoriallibrary.org/	
Tunbridge Public Library	Public	Tunbridge, VT	http://www.tunbridgelibrary.org/	2011-12-19
Varnum Memorial Library	Public	Jeffersonville, VT	http://thevarnum.org/	2012-03-26
Vernon Free Library	Public	Vernon, VT	http://www.vernonfreelibrary.org/vernon/	2013-02-11
Warren Public Library	Public	Warren, VT	http://www.warrenlibrary.com/warren/	2011-04-02
Warren United Church	Church	Warren, VT	http://www.warrenchurch.org/	2011-04-02
Weathersfield Proctor Library	Public	Ascutney, VT	http://www.weathersfieldproctorlibrary.org/	
West Hartford Library	Public	West Hartford, VT	https://westhartfordlibraryvt.wordpress.com/	
Westford Public Library	Public	Westford, VT	https://westfordpubliclibrary.wordpress.com/	2013-03-11
Wilder Club & Library	Public	Wilder, VT	http://www.quecheeandwilderlibraries.com/home/?page_id=10	
Windsor Public Library	Public	Windsor, VT	http://windsorlibrary.org/	2011-12-01
