= FOLIO (library services platform) =

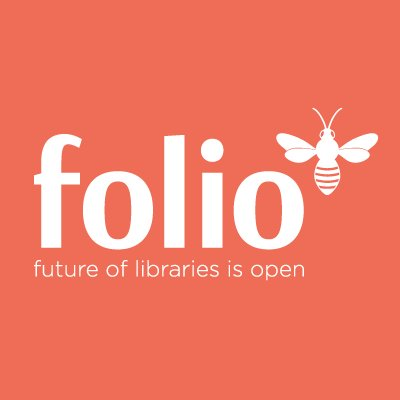
- Developer: FOLIO Community
- Stable release: Sunflower (R1 2025) / 2025-05-23
- Preview release: Trillium / 2025-11-10
- Written in: Java, JavaScript
- Type: Library management system
- License: Apache License 2.0
- Website: www.folio.org
- Repository: github.com/folio-org

FOLIO (stylized as FOLIO, from Latin folium "leaf") is an open-source, cloud-enabled software platform for library management systems developed by the international FOLIO community. Development began in 2015, led by the software company Index Data and funded by EBSCO Information Services. A runnable software platform was made publicly available in September 2016, and an early version including functional library modules was announced for 2018.

== Objectives ==
The software is designed to be easily extensible, capable of being operated either locally or as a multi-tenant cloud system, and to meet the requirements of academic libraries in the areas of metadata management, acquisitions, electronic resource management, circulation, user management, system administration, and integration.

The project aims to provide an open-source alternative to proprietary library systems such as Alma by Ex Libris and WorldShare Management Services (WMS) by OCLC.

== History ==
Development of FOLIO began in 2015, led by Index Data.

- In 2016, the Open Library Foundation was established to provide governance, manage intellectual property, and coordinate community development of the platform.
- By 2018, FOLIO reached an early stage of maturity with the release of its first functional library management modules, enabling pilot implementations in academic library environments.
- In 2019, Chalmers University Library became one of the first academic libraries to adopt FOLIO in a production environment.

During the 2020s, FOLIO saw increasing international adoption, with implementations and migration projects announced by library consortia and academic institutions in Europe and North America.

== Code and architecture ==
The software code is managed on GitHub, and an introduction for prospective software developers is available on dev.folio.org.

Technologies used include Vert.x and JSON for inter-module communication, React and Redux for the user interface, and RAML for the persistence interface.

The software platform—referred to as the "platform"—consists of a user interface framework, a message bus called "Okapi" for inter-process communication between modules, and a system administration layer including a database. Functional modules such as circulation and acquisitions are built on top of this platform.

== Adoption and use ==
FOLIO supports more than 25 languages. Example of usage.

=== Africa ===
- Durban University of Technology
- Open Window Institute (RSA)

=== Asia ===
- Jio Institute (India)
- Shanghai Library

=== Australia ===
- National Library of Australia

=== Europe ===
- Chalmers University Library
- National Széchényi Library
- Suomen Pankki
- Universidad de Zaragoza
- Universitätsbibliothek Leipzig
- Lyon 1 Université

=== North and South America ===
- Cornell University Library
- Library of Congress
- Stanford University Libraries
- Texas A&M University Libraries
- Universidad de Concepción
- Universidad Jorge Tadeo Lozano
- University of Chicago Library

== Open Library Foundation ==
The Open Library Foundation was established in 2016 to manage organization, finances, and intellectual property rights. It is based in the United States and operates as a non-profit organization. In 2016, the community of the Kuali Open Library Environment project joined the foundation, leaving the Kuali Foundation to continue pursuing its goals using the new FOLIO platform.

== See also ==
- Daniel Forsman
- List of free and open-source software packages - integrated library management software

Software:

- Evergreen
- Invenio
- Koha
