= CQL =

As an abbreviation, CQL can refer to:

== Computing ==
- Chess Query Language, a query language for interrogating chess databases
- Contextual Query Language (or common query language), for information retrieval
- Cassandra Query Language, for Apache Cassandra
- Classora Query Language, for Classora Knowledge Base
- Clinical Quality Language, a high-level, domain-specific language focused on clinical quality and targeted at measure and decision support artifact authors.
- CIM Query Language, a query language for the Common Information Model (CIM) standard from the Distributed Management Task Force (DMTF)
- Cypher Query Language, a declarative graph query language that allows for expressive and efficient querying and updating of a property graph.
- Confluence Query Language, for Atlassian Confluence

== Other uses ==
- Chén Qíng Lìng (陈情令), The Untamed, a Chinese TV series
- Conseil québécois du loisir or Quebec Leisure Council, a non-profit umbrella organisation promoting leisure in the province of Quebec, Canada
