= Lawrence Memorial Library =

Lawrence Memorial Library may refer to:

- Lawrence Memorial Library (Bristol, Vermont)
- Lawrence Memorial Library (Climax, Michigan)
- Lawrence Memorial Library (Springfield, Illinois)
