= LibLime =

- Type: Private
- Industry: Computer software
- Founded: 2005
- Headquarters: Maryland, USA
- Products: LibLime KOHA; LibLime Enterprise KOHA ‡biblios.net
- Website: http://liblime.com/ / http://www.ptfs.com/

LibLime is a commercial entity providing implementation and development services around the open source Integrated library system Koha. LibLime was founded in 2005, as part of Metavore Inc. and purchased by Progressive Technology Federal Systems, Inc. (PTFS) in 2010.

== History ==
LibLime was founded in 2005 by Joshua Ferraro, a systems administrator who helped spearhead the migration project of moving the Athens County Public Libraries in Ohio to use OpenSource software called "Koha", a system generally considered to be the earliest open-source ILS still in production. LibLime and Ferraro soon became involved in further developing the product, and Ferraro was elected as the official Koha Project Release Manager for version 3.0.0.

In 2006, LibLime acquired the assets of Skemotah Solutions, another US-based Koha support company.

In March 2007, LibLime acquired the Koha division of Katipo Communications Ltd - the original developers of Koha. Assets involved in the acquisition included existing support contracts with libraries that contracted with Katipo, copyrights on the original Koha source code, and the koha.org domain and Website.

Koha 3.0.0 was released in August 2008 three years after the release of version 2.2.0 (Jan 6 2005).

In July 2008, LibLime acquired select assets of partner CARE Affiliates, Inc. Assets involved in the acquisition included existing support contracts for OpenTranslators and Masterkey, as well as copyrights and trademarks related to OpenTranslators.

In January 2009, the company launched ‡biblios.net, a free cataloging service.

In 2009 a dispute arose between LibLime and other members of the Koha community. The dispute centred on LibLime's apparent reluctance to be inclusive with the content of the http://koha.org/ sites and the non-contribution of software patches back to the community. A number of participants declared that they believed that LibLime had forked the software. A separate web presence, source code repository and community was established at http://www.koha-community.org/ .

In March 2010, LibLime was purchased by PTFS, a US Federal Government contractor.

The dispute with the Koha community deepened in November 2011 when it was reported that LibLime had applied to New Zealand's Ministry of Economic Development for a trademark of the name 'KOHA'. The Horowhenua Library Trust, who originally had Koha developed, has objected to LibLime's proposal, saying that "the Trust had created something really good, and given it away to the world, and that now LibLime wants to take it".

== Products ==
LibLime KOHA open-source integrated library system: A LibLime variant of Koha based on Koha 3.0. Announced May 2011.

LibLime Enterprise KOHA integrated library system: A LibLime variant of Koha based on Koha 3.0. Announced Sept 2009.

== Programs and projects ==
=== Koha open-source integrated library system ===
Koha is a full-featured open-source integrated library system licensed under the GNU General Public License.

LibLime's historical contributions to the project included handling release management and quality assurance. Through the integrated Zebra software (from Index Data, a Danish company), Koha provides advanced search options: full support for Boolean and hierarchically-nested queries; searching by language, year, and library-defined types; sub-type limits based on audience, content, and format which utilize coded values in the MARC record. Also available are re-sort and Amazon-style 'refine by' options. Additionally, users can sort their results by popularity, author, title, date published; narrow search results by branch, subject, or series title; and even limit to currently available items. LibLime developed the integration between Zebra and Koha.

Other major contributions of LibLime to Koha included:

- Koha's Amazon.com module
- Koha's original Z39.50 Server
- MARC21 Authorities support in Koha
- implemented proper handling of MARC8 encoded data

=== ‡biblios.net ===
‡biblios.net is a free cataloguing service.

=== Koha with Class ===
Building on the success of a pilot program at Texas Woman's University in 2006, LibLime's Koha with Class initiative provides library school classrooms with hosted installations of Koha, free of charge. The project has a very active following with dozens of college and universities participating.
