= ‡biblios.net =

Free internet cataloging service

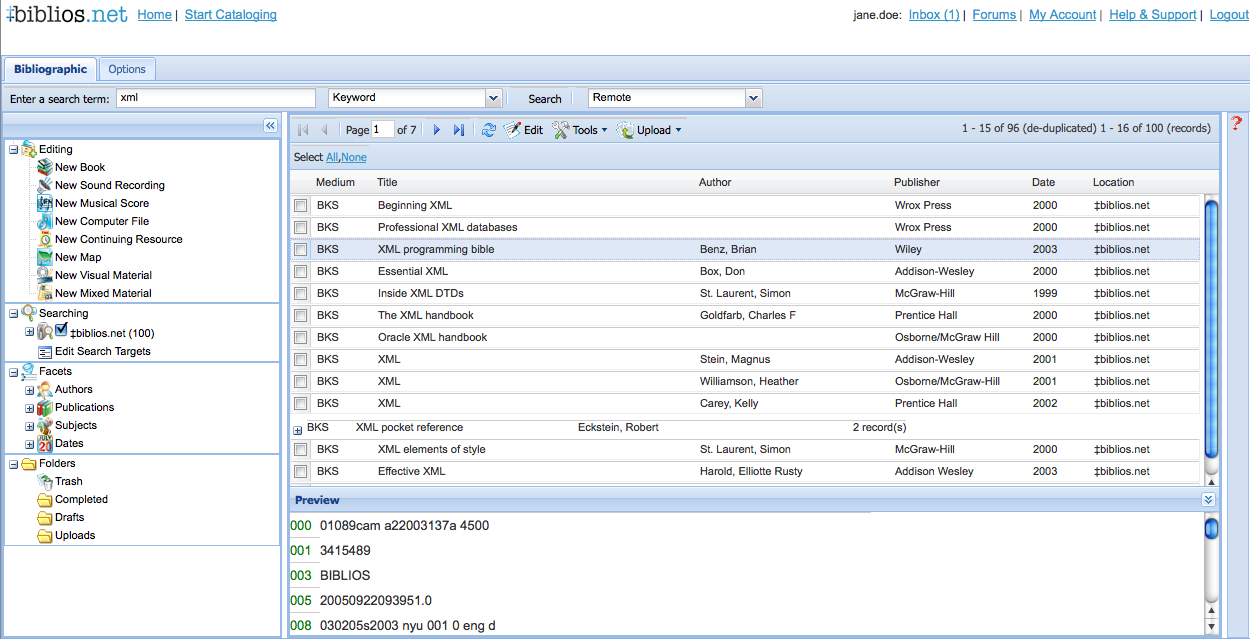
- Screenshot of ‡biblios.net cataloging page.
- Company type: For profit
- Website type: Library Cataloging
- Available in: English
- Headquarters: Columbus, Ohio
- Owner: LibLime
- Website: biblios.net
- Commercial: Yes
- Registration: Required
- Launched: January 19, 2009

‡biblios.net is a free browser-based cataloging service with a data store containing over thirty million records. Records are licensed under the Open Data Commons Public Domain Dedication and License, making the service the world's largest repository of freely-licensed library records. The service was created and is maintained by LibLime.

== Features ==
‡biblios.net (pronounced 'biblios dot net') features a metadata editor with templates, macros, authority auto-completion and embedded context-sensitive help. The central record repository contains 25-million bibliographic records and just under eight-million authority records. The data is maintained by ‡biblios.net users. Catalogers can use and contribute to the database without restrictions because records in ‡biblios.net are freely-licensed under the Open Data Commons Public Domain Dedication and License.

‡biblios.net also includes a built-in federated search system, allowing catalogers to find records from any Z39.50 target. Additionally, there is a central Search Target Registry, seeded with over 2,000 Z39.50 servers, for catalogers to find, create and share Z39.50 targets.

In addition to offering a traditional cataloging interface, ‡biblios.net offers social cataloging features. Built-in forums and private messaging make finding help and communicating with others possible within the software.
