= Libramatic =

- Genre: Integrated library system
- Founded: July 2012
- Owner: BitBaboon
- Website: libramatic.com

Libramatic is a cloud-based library management service provider based in Dublin, Ireland

Libramatic allows librarians to catalog library inventory by scanning an ISBN using a smartphone's camera or by using a USB barcode scanner on a personal computer.

Libramatic officially launched in July 2012 at a startup event in Dublin.

By utilising a correlation of multiple online data sources, it searches for information on that book using an undisclosed algorithm and stores it allowing librarians to circulate books based on an ISBN.

The use of online library management systems has increased drastically since the rise of "cloud" technology. Many modern cloud-based solutions now allow automated cataloging by scanning a book's ISBN. This technology was pioneered by Libramatic, although it is currently in use by systems such as LibraryWorld.
