= Joshua Ferraro =

American entrepreneur and computer scientist

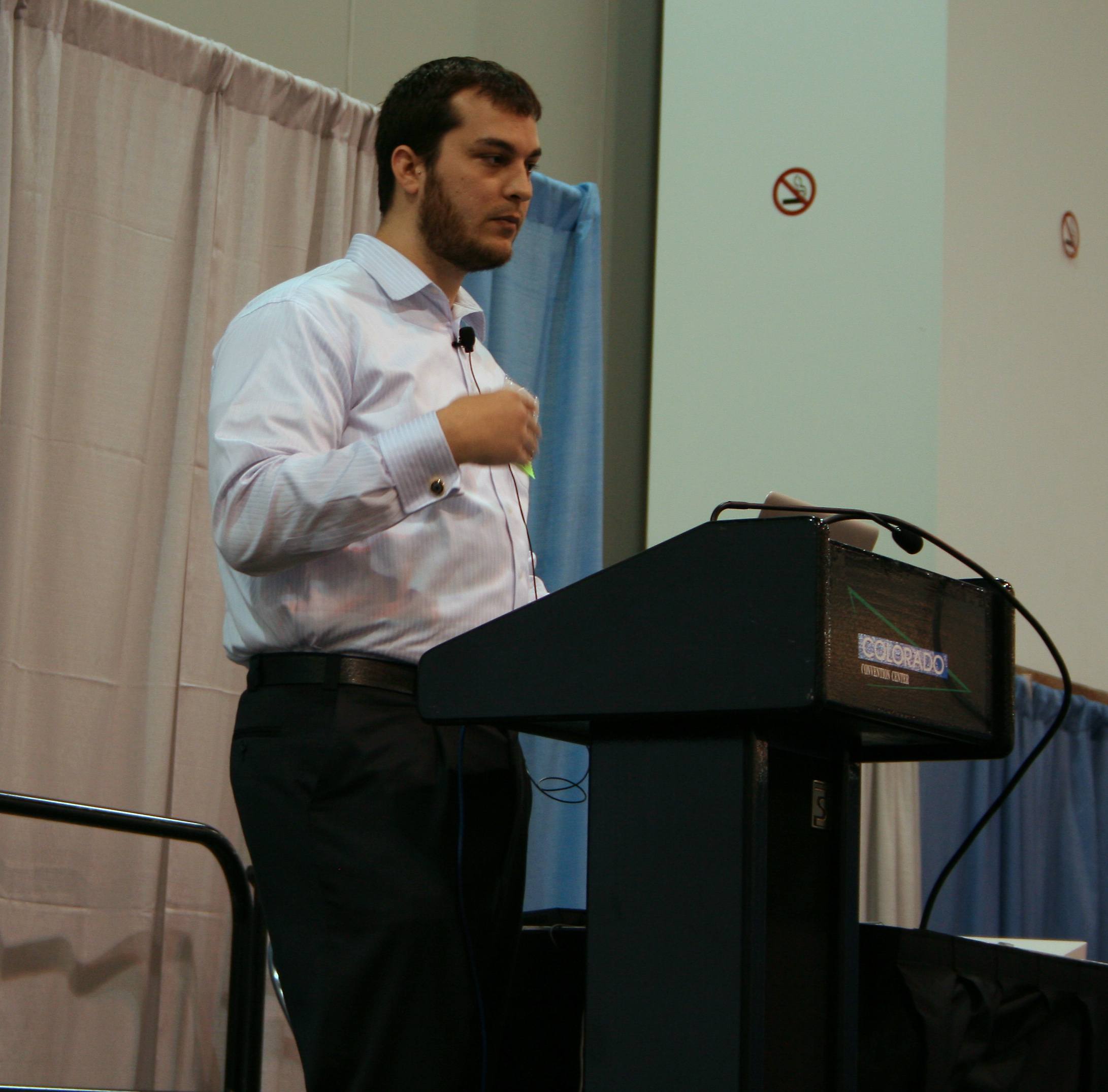
- Joshua Ferraro speaking at a conference of the American Library Association in Denver in January, 2009.

Joshua Ferraro is an American entrepreneur and computer scientist.

Ferraro was the founding CEO of LibLime and grew the company to profitability with over 600 customers under 140 contracts. Under his leadership, LibLime grew rapidly into the largest support organization for the Koha open-source integrated library system (ILS), acquiring key Koha assets including a Koha trademark in United States, copyrights for the original Koha source code, and the Koha.org domain. He was chief architect for ‡biblios.net, the company's free cataloging service and the world's largest database of openly licensed library records. He also successfully navigated the company through a major business process change with the launch of LibLime Enterprise Koha (LLEK), an enterprise edition of Koha distributed only as a cloud computing software as a service solution. LibLime sold to PTFS, Inc. in March, 2010.

== Awards ==
In 2008, Ferraro was named one of Library Journal's "Movers and shakers."

== Publications ==
- Mashing up open data with biblios.net Web services Engard, Nicole, 2009: Library Mashups: Exploring New Ways to Deliver Library Data
