= Tind =

Tind may refer to:

== Places ==
- Tind, Nordland, a village in Moskenes Municipality in Nordland county, Norway
- Tind Municipality, a historic spelling of Tinn Municipality in Telemark county, Norway

== Other ==
- TIND, a subsidiary of Invenio
