= SRW =

SRW may refer to:

- Search/Retrieve Web Service
- Super Robot Wars, a video game series published by Banpresto
