= NewGenLib =

Library management system

- Original authors: Siddhartha Errabolu and L.J.Haravu
- Developer: Verus Solutions
- Release: March 2005
- Stable release: 3.1.2 / May 15, 2015; 11 years ago
- Written in: Java
- Operating system: Linux, Windows
- Type: Integrated library system
- License: GNU General Public License
- Website: verussolutions.biz

NewGenLib is an integrated library management system developed by Verus Solutions Pvt Ltd. Domain expertise is provided by Kesavan Institute of Information and Knowledge Management in Hyderabad, India. NewGenLib version 1.0 was released in March 2005. On 9 January 2008, NewGenLib was declared free and open-source under GNU GPL. The latest version of NewGenLib is 3.1.1 released on 16 April 2015. Many libraries across the globe (mainly from developing countries) are using NewGenLib as their Primary integrated library management system as seen from the NewGenlib discussion forum.

== Modules & Functions ==
NewGenLib has the following main modules:

- Acquisitions
- Technical Processing
- Serials management
- Circulation
- Administration
- MIS Reports
- Task to do today (daily scheduler)
- OPAC

Some advanced functional features:

- Android mobile and tablet capable
- Integration with Twitter helping send messages of transactions directly to users’ Twitter accounts.
- Flexibility of defining own search field in OPAC.
- Enhanced content and interactive OPAC like Availability of Book jackets, Google preview, Comments/ Book reviews, Tagging, Favorite reading list, etc.
- Zotero compliant OPAC
- RSS Feeds in OPAC
- Faceted Browsing (Refining search results)
- Suggestion for other books on the rack
- RFID supports
- Provision for frequently used predefined templates along with freedom of defining own customized data entry templates in Cataloguing
- Configurable SMS system - a proof of transaction.
- Integration with Gmail or paid mailbox account. This enables the automatic sending of email to patrons during issue /return.
- Enhanced Report Module for generating in .csv format with a provision for wide customization.
- Provision for integrating with Vufind SOPAC (Ex: OPAC of the Library of Bangalore University).
- Catalogue can be harvested through Google site map, and thus the visibility of the library can be further improved.

== Technologies Used & Standards Supported ==
NewGenLib uses several open-source components such as PostgreSQL, Apache Tomcat, and Solr Lucene. It is entirely Java-based, platform-neutral, and its presentation, web server, and database layers uses the following technologies.

- Java SE
- Apache Tomcat server
- Spring framework
- Hibernate framework
- Lucene and Solr
- JDOM for XML messaging
- Java Servlets, JavaServer Pages
- Java Mail
- OpenOffice.org for form letters
- JasperReports
- FreeMarker template (from version 3.04 R1)

NewGenLib is platform-independent and can be installed on Linux and Windows operating systems.

Standards supported by NewGenLib

- MARC21 – For bibliographic data

  − Import and Export in ISO 2709, MARC XML

- MARC21 – For authority files

  − Import available in ISO 2709

- MARC21 – Holdings

  − Holdings data structures designed for MARC21 Holdings.

- Z39.76 – Holdings statement display
- MODS 3.0, AGRIS AP

 − Bibliographic records can be exported in MODS 3.0 and AGRIS AP

- ISBD

 − Record display and punctuations as per ISBD rules.

- OAI-PMH

 − Allows harvesting (manual) from external repositories
  − Create Open archive collections, and items, search the repositories, and also act as a data provider
 − Metadata formats: MARC XML, DUBLIN CORE, MODS 3.0 and AGRIS

- SRU/W

 − Federated search engines can search bibliographic databases using this protocol
 − Query language: CQL (Common Query Language), benchmarking Level 1 compliance
 − Profiles used: BATH, and DUBLIN CORE
 − Metadata standards: MARC XML and MODS 3.0

- Unicode 4.0
- Z39.50 Client for federated searching

It is also Zotero Compliant.

== Types of libraries ==
NewGenLib can be used for any type of library. Presently, it is used by Libraries of the following types.

- University Libraries
- College/School libraries
- Public libraries
- Libraries in Research Institutes
- Church libraries
- Libraries in Offices/Corporates

== See also ==
- List of free and open source software packages
