= Lawrence Memorial Library (Bristol, Vermont) =

Library in Vermont, US

- 44°8′8.8″N 73°4′42.5″W
- Location: Bristol, Vermont
- Type: Public library
- Established: January 20, 1893

Other information
- Budget: US$113,932
- Director: Nancy Wilson
- Website: (home page) http://www.lawrencelibrary.net/ (catalog) http://bristol.kohavt.org/

The Lawrence Memorial Library is a public library located in Bristol, Vermont.

== History ==
The Lawrence Memorial Library was established as the Bristol Library on January 20, 1883, when a group of citizens formed the Bristol Library Association. The library was opened to the public on August 5, 1883, in one room over the Patterson Store. It was financed by membership fees, yearly tickets of US$1, private contributions, fundraising entertainments, and a three cents per book borrowing fee.

In March 1901, a town meeting action appropriated $50 to help establish a public library. Appropriations were increased to $200 in 1902 and 1903. In March 1902, the Bristol Library Association turned over its property, which included 1095 books and a large collection of magazines, to the town. The Bristol Public Library was established. Yearly and rental fees ceased.

At the annual town meeting in 1910, William Lawrence stated "I propose to erect a building up to date in every respect, and deed it to the town of Bristol for consideration of $1.00; the building to be used for library purposes only, and to be the property of the town so long as it is so used; that the town shall maintain the same." The townspeople voted to accept Lawrence's offer and appropriated $800 to the library. The building was completed and dedicated January 17, 1911. It was given in memory of Lockie Partch Lawrence, first wife of William Lawrence, and of his second wife, Minnie Peet Lawrence, both of whom had been faithful workers in the library association. At the dedication of the library, attended by over 600 people, Lawrence said, "I am aware that this new library, which we are here to dedicate this night, is not an elaborate affair, but is substantial, plain, modest, like the characters of the lives of those whose memory this new home for the library is to commemorate." As she accepted the library on behalf of the town and the library board of trustees president Mrs. W.W. Rider said, in thanking Lawrence, "Our books will be safe and carefully preserved and accessible to all. How noble is the gift. How inspiring at the present time and for the ages that shall mark it hereafter. May this memorial library ever be precious."

In his will, Lawrence left the town real estate consisting of four tenement houses on Lawrence Lane and a two-tenement house beside the library to help finance the library. The houses were later sold, the money invested, and a portion used to support the annual operation of the library. Ongoing support for the library comes from tax funds, endowment and investment income, and fundraising.

In 1998, using a combination of funds raised through special events and a town appropriation, a handicapped accessible entrance and lift was constructed on the east side of the building. This greatly improved access to the long-unused basement. In 2000, the basement level was renovated for use as a children's room. The project was paid for through fundraising and an appropriation from the State of Vermont. In 2002, grant money funded a renovation of the main floor of the library. During all of these building projects care was taken to maintain the historic integrity of the building.

In 2014 the library joined the Vermont Organization of Koha Automated Libraries (VOKAL) instead, and is now automated using the Koha Integrated Library System.
