= INSPIRE-HEP =

High energy physics research database

INSPIRE-HEP is an open access digital library for the field of high energy physics (HEP). It is the successor of the Stanford Physics Information Retrieval System (SPIRES) database, the main literature database for high energy physics since the 1970s.

== History ==
SPIRES was (in addition to the CERN Document Server (CDS), arXiv and parts of Astrophysics Data System) one of the main Particle Information Resources. A survey conducted in 2007 found that SPIRES database users wanted the portal to provide more services than the, at that time, already 30-year-old system could provide. On the second annual Summit of Information Specialists in Particle Physics and Astrophysics in May 2008, the physics laboratories CERN, DESY, SLAC and Fermilab therefore announced that they would work together to create a new Scientific Information System for high energy physics called INSPIRE. It interacts with other HEP service providers like arXiv.org, Particle Data Group, NASA's Astrophysics Data System. and HEPdata. In April 2010, a beta version of INSPIRE-HEP was freely accessible, in April 2012, it fully replaced SPIRES. A new and upgraded INSPIRE platform was officially released in March 2020. As of 2026, INSPIRE is run by a collaboration consisting of 7 member institutions: CERN, DESY, IN2P3, IHEP, SLAC, Fermilab, and TIB.

== Content ==
INSPIRE-HEP combines the SPIRES-HEP database content with the open source digital library software Invenio and the content of the CERN Document server. In addition to scientific papers, INSPIRE-HEP provides other information such-as citation metrics, plots extracted from papers or internal experiment notes and tools for users to improve metadata like crowdsourcing for author disambiguation. As of March 2025, INSPIRE-HEP contains 1.7 million literature records. INSPIRE provides not only a literature database for the field of High-Energy Physics, but for other HEP-related services:

- HEPNames: a comprehensive directory of people involved in High-Energy Physics
- Institutions: a database compiling over 12000 institutes related to the HEP field; included in the information about each institute is a link to all the papers in INSPIRE-HEP that are associated with the institution as well as a list of people (taken from HEPNames)
- Conferences: a collection of HEP meetings and conferences
- Jobs: a listing of academic and research jobs of interest to the community in high energy physics, nuclear physics, accelerator physics and astrophysics
- Experiments: a database containing summaries of HEP and HEP-related experiments from different labs and locations around the world

== See also ==
- List of academic databases and search engines
