= Search/Retrieve Web Service =

Search/Retrieve Web service (SRW) is a web service for search and retrieval. SRW provides a SOAP interface to queries, to augment the URL interface provided by its companion protocol Search/Retrieve via URL (SRU). Queries in SRU and SRW are expressed using the Contextual Query Language (CQL).

Standards for SRW, SRU, and CQL are promulgated by the United States Library of Congress.

The SRW service and SRU protocol were both created by as part of the ZING (Z39.50 International: Next Generation) initiative as successors to the Z39.50 protocol.

== See also ==
- Z39.50

=== Implementations ===
- refbase
- RefDB
- Te Ara: The Encyclopedia of New Zealand
