= Helen Day Montanari =

American educator philanthropist

- Born: Helen Ranney Day; February 17, 1881; Roxbury, Massachusetts, U.S.
- Died: 1955 (aged 72–73)

Helen Day Montanari (February 17, 1881 – 1955) was an American educator and philanthropist. The Helen Day Memorial Art Center in Stowe, Vermont, rebranded in 2021 as The Current, was named for her.

== Early life ==
Helen Ranney Day was born in 1881 in Roxbury, Massachusetts, to Frank Ashley Day, a Boston banker, and May Emma Ranney. Her mother died when Helen was around eight years old, and her father remarried, to Mary Almeda Ellison.

== Career ==
In the 1940s, Montanari and her partner, Dr. Marguerite Lichtenthaeler (1887–1974), ran an "Aryans-only" inn, the Attic & Barn, in Stowe. For nearly two decades, brochures offering lodging options for visitors to Stowe included those which excluded people of Jewish faith.

Montanari and Lichtenthaeler, who shared intellectual interests, loved to travel, and shared a concern for the quality of life in Stowe, left a $40,000 trust to establish an art center and a library in the town. The Helen Day Memorial Library was founded in 1981, in a building formerly used as Stowe Village School from 1863. Years later, there was a successful campaign to raise the remainder of the money that was needed for the Stowe Free Library and the Helen Day Art Center.

== Personal life ==
Day married Carlo Montanari, a Harvard graduate and member of the Italian Army, on April 20, 1904, the ceremony taking place in Eliot Congregational Church in Eliot, Maine, although another source states it took place in Newton, Massachusetts. They had two children: a son and another Harvard graduate, Franco Vittorio, and daughter, Emma Maria.

In 1938, Montanari was a member of the Appalachian Mountain Club in Boston.

Montanari died in 1955, aged 72 or 73.
