= Brown Public Library =

Public library in Northfield, Vermont, U.S.

Coordinates: 44.147503°N 72.656082°W

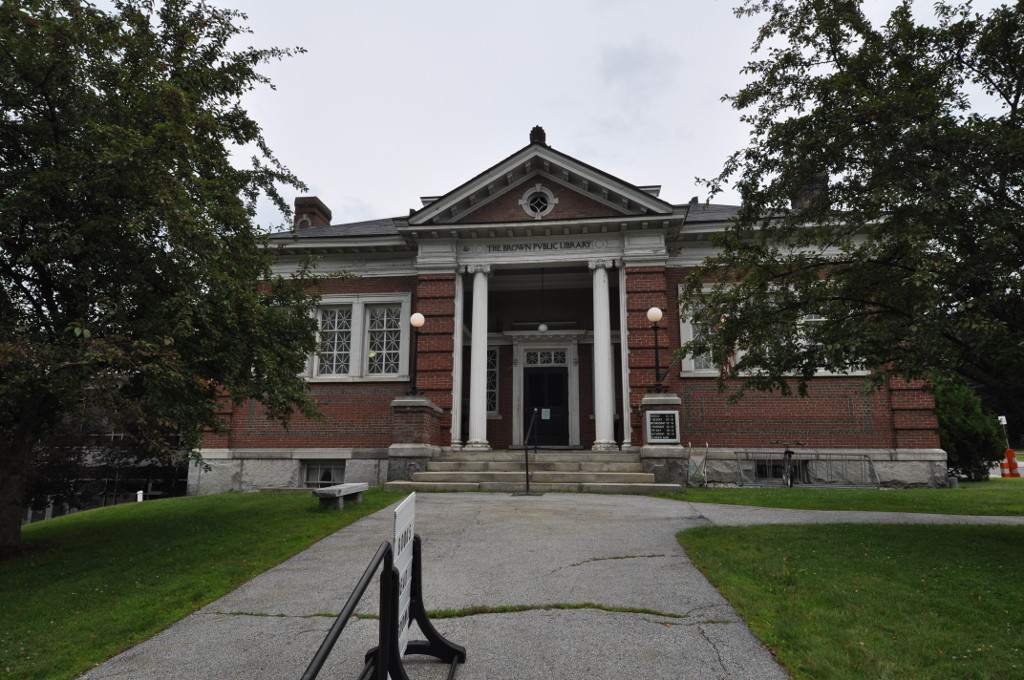

The Brown Public Library is a public library in Northfield, Vermont.

It is a brick building opened in 1906. A recent extension connects it to the building of the Northfield Historical Society, located in the former home of Charles Paine, a 19th-century governor and local businessman. Above the fireplaces in the north and south reading rooms are paintings of historic interest relating to the library and Northfield.

In July 2016, the Brown Public Library was named most beautiful library in the state of Vermont by Tech Insider.

The library shares a unified catalog and circulation system with over 50 other Vermont libraries through the Vermont Organization of Koha Automated Libraries.
