= Daniel Forsman =

Swedish librarian and archivist

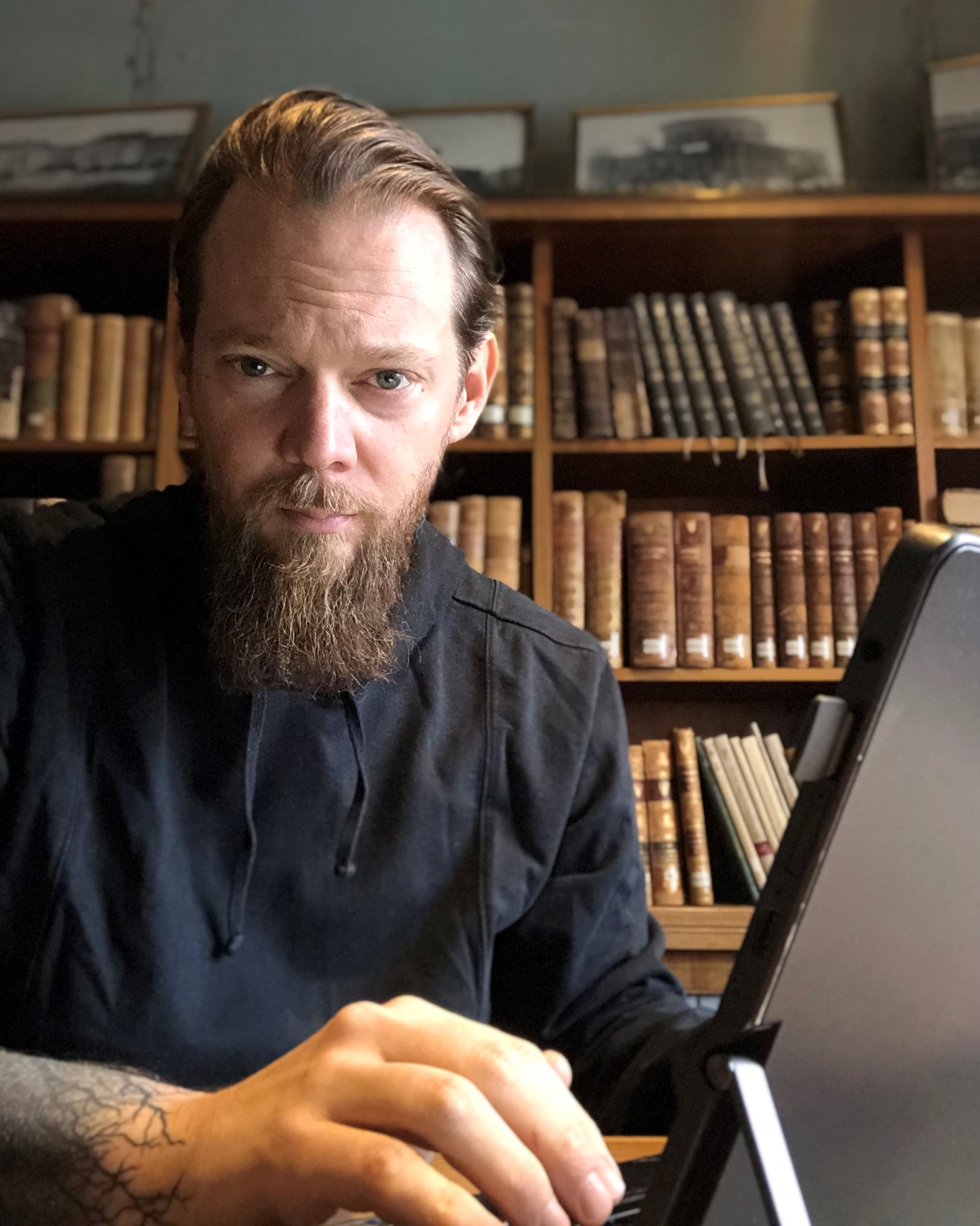
- Daniel Forsman, in the office of the Stockholm City Librarian.
- Alma mater: University of Borås
- Occupation: Director-General of the National Archives (2026–)
- Employer: Chalmers University of Technology (2010–); Jönköping University; Stockholm Public Library (2018–)
- Works: A Year from Now You Will Wish You Had Started Today - Redefining Strategy and Organization for Library Automation and Content, Change as a service - challenges and effects of a new paradigm for library systems and content infrastructure, Introducing agile principles and management to a library organization, Library Analytics: Shaping the Future — A Case of Strategic Library Transformation Using Data Analytics: Chalmers University of Technology, There is no failure except in no longer trying : embedding UX in organizational culture
- Position held: Director-General of the National Archives (2026–), city librarian (2018–2026)

Daniel Forsman (born 1976) is a Swedish librarian. Since 2018, he has served as City Librarian of Stockholm and assumes office as the head of the National Archives of Sweden on 1 March 2026.

Forsman has held several senior leadership positions within Swedish research and public libraries. A significant part of his career was spent at the Chalmers University of Technology Library, where he worked in strategic and managerial roles focusing on digital infrastructure, organizational change, and library systems development.

At Chalmers, Forsman was closely involved in the transition to modern, service-oriented library system architectures and was one of the early advocates for the adoption of FOLIO, an open-source library services platform. The implementation at Chalmers has been cited as an example of a large research library moving away from proprietary systems toward an open, modular, and community-driven infrastructure, aligned with principles of openness and interoperability.

In 2018, Forsman was appointed City Librarian of Stockholm, where he has overseen the strategic development of Stockholm Public Library, including digital services, data-informed management, and organizational transformation.

In 2025, the Government of Sweden announced his appointment as National Archivist of Sweden, with his term beginning in March 2026.

== Research and publications ==
- Forsman, Daniel (2012). "Change as a service – challenges and effects of a new paradigm for library systems and content infrastructure". The Electronic Library. doi:10.1108/01435121211279867
- Forsman, Daniel (2012). "A Year from Now You Will Wish You Had Started Today – Redefining Strategy and Organization for Library Automation and Content".
- Forsman, Daniel "Introducing agile principles and management to a library organization". The Electronic Library
- Forsman, Daniel (nov 2018). "Library Analytics: Shaping the Future — A Case of Strategic Library Transformation Using Data Analytics: Chalmers University of Technology"
- Forsman, Daniel (juni 2022) "There is no failure except in no longer trying : embedding UX in organizational culture" UXLibs

Government offices
Preceded by Karin Åström Iko	National Archivist of Sweden; 2026–	Succeeded by
