= Free Public Library Service (Vermont) =

State agency providing library services to Vermonters

Agency overview
- Formed: November 6, 1894
- Dissolved: March 31, 1970
- Superseding agency: Vermont Department of Libraries
- Jurisdiction: State of Vermont

The Free Public Library Service (FPLS) was one of two state library agencies in Vermont. It was created in 1894 through an act of the State Legislature. The act mandated the creation of a state board of library commissioners, who would offer advice to existing free public libraries. The commission would also offer $100 for towns without libraries to purchase books to start a library, provided they set it up with a trained board of trustees.

FPLS ran a series of regional libraries, maintained a union catalog, and provided for bookmobile and interlibrary loan services in the state between 1894 and 1970. It also oversaw the Dorothy Canfield Fisher Children's Book Award and provided library services to individuals with print disabilities. It merged with the State Library to become the Department of Libraries on March 31, 1970.

== Bookmobile service ==
FPLS began Vermont's first "book-wagon" service in 1922 funded by the state Federation of Women's Clubs. It delivered book and other materials to small libraries, and loaned materials directly to individuals in towns without libraries. By 1940, FPLS has developed regional library services and divided the state into four regions, each with its own bookwagon funded by the Federation of Women's Clubs. In 1957 as a result of funding received through the new federal Library Services Act, FPLS purchased two larger type bookwagons that could hold materials and patrons. In 1970, FPLS merged with the State Library to create the Department of Libraries. The State Board of Libraries decided to discontinue state-operated bookmobile service in 1974.

== FPLS Executive Secretaries ==
Year(s)	Name
1969–1970	James Igoe
1968–1969	Lillian Irons
1965–1968	Elena Horton
1964–1965	Lillian Irons
1957–1964	Jane Hobson
1935–1957	Dorothy Randolph Barre
1928–1935	Elizabeth T. Williams
1924–1928	Mildred C. Cook
1922–1924	Helen M. Richards
1920–1922	Julia C. Carter
1917–1920	Ruth Brown
1910–1917	Rebecca Wright
1904–1910	Frances Hobart
1903–1904	Esther Taber
1901–1903	M. H. Buckham
1901	Charlotte Gibson
1894–1901	Mary L. Titcomb
