= St. Johnsbury Athenaeum =

- Location: St. Johnsbury, Vermont
- Established: 1871

Other information
- Website: http://www.stjathenaeum.org/
- St. Johnsbury Athenaeum
- U.S. National Register of Historic Places
- U.S. National Historic Landmark
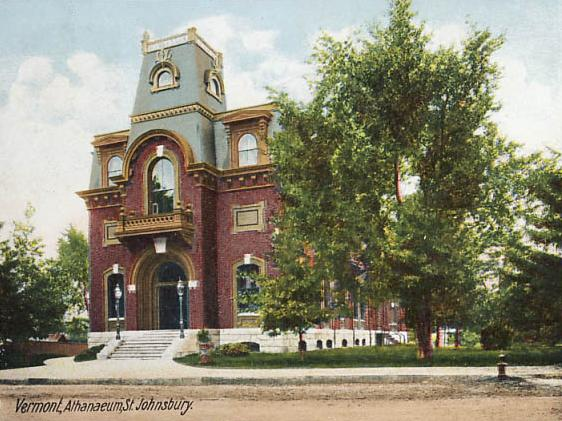
- The Athenaeum in 1906

- Location within Vermont Location within the United States
- Location: St. Johnsbury, Vermont
- Coordinates: 44°25′6.38″N 72°1′15.72″W
- Built: 1871
- Architect: John Davis Hatch III
- Architectural style: Second Empire
- NRHP reference No.: 96000970

Significant dates
- Added to NRHP: July 18, 1996
- Designated NHL: July 18, 1996

The St. Johnsbury Athenaeum (often written St. Johnsbury Athenæum) is a combined library and art gallery, in St. Johnsbury, Vermont. The building in which it is housed is architecturally and historically significant because of its construction. The Athenaeum is also noted for the American landscape paintings and books in its collection and its having been funded by Horace Fairbanks, manufacturer of the world's first platform scale. The art collection contains a number of Hudson River School paintings. This building retains a strong Victorian (French Second Empire) flavor of the 19th century.

== History ==
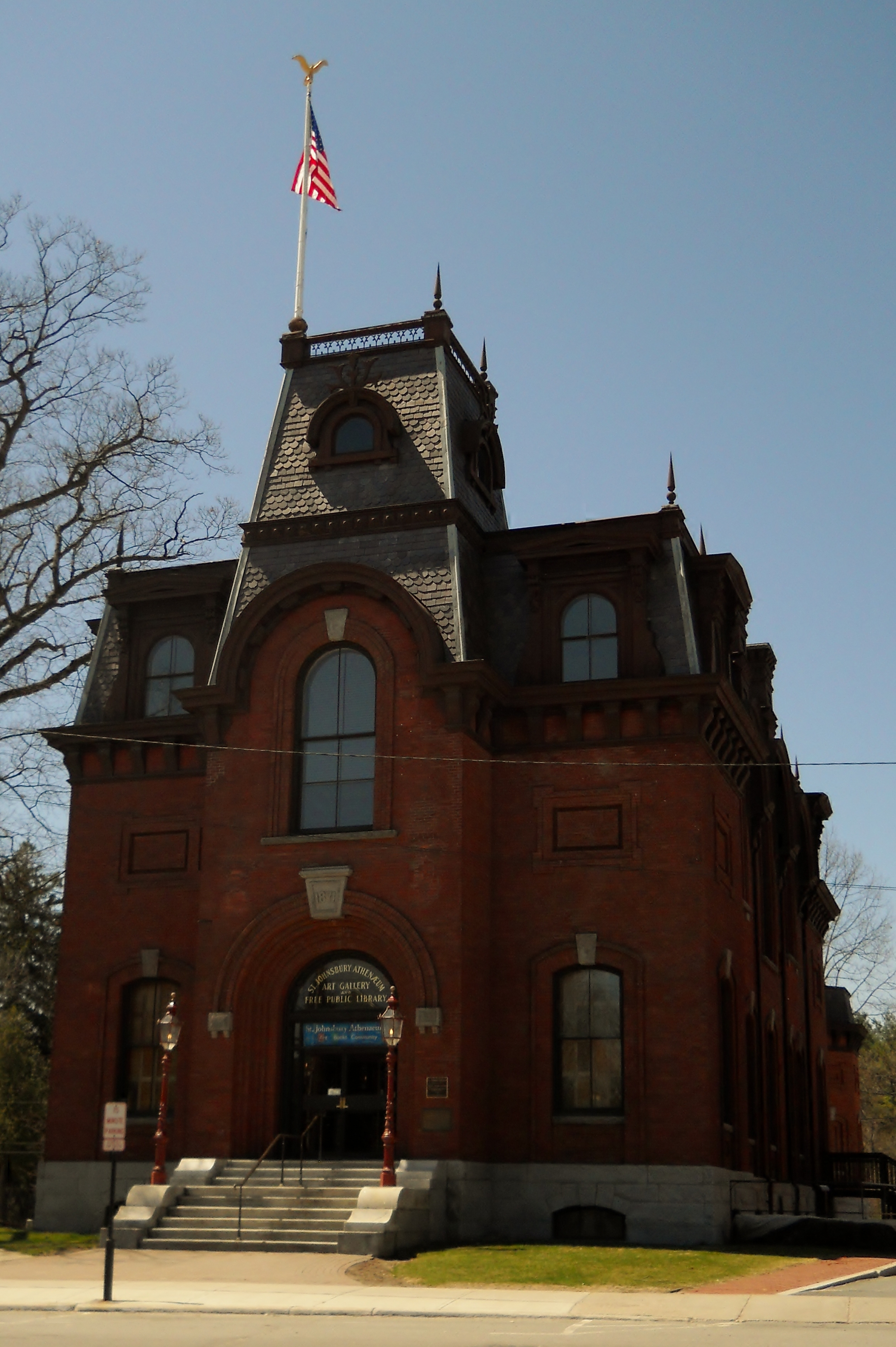
The St. Johnsbury Athenaeum in 2011

When the library opened, the collection consisted of 8,000 books selected by bibliographer William F. Poole.

=== Art Gallery ===
In 1873, Fairbanks added a small art gallery. This is now one of the few art galleries in the United States that features late 19th century Victorian-style design which highlights intricate paint/stencil schemes, detailed moldings, creative natural lighting, and unique painting installations.

The walls and floor are black walnut. The art gallery is lighted naturally from an arched skylight in the ceiling. Cases on two sides of the room contain art books in tooled leather bindings. Gilt-framed paintings are displayed.

One hundred works of art are on display. Besides originals by American artists, there are also copies of European masterpieces. The major part of the collection is by American and European artists from the late eighteenth century to the middle nineteenth century. Hudson River School painters include Asher B. Durand, Jasper Francis Cropsey, Sanford Gifford, a Luminist painter, James and William Hart pastoral landscapes with cattle. Western scenes are portrayed by Samuel Colman and Worthington Whittredge. Dominating the room is a canvas, ten by fifteen feet, of the Domes of Yosemite, by Albert Bierstadt.

European painters represented by original works of art include: Bouguereau ("Raspberry Girl"), Félix Ziem ("Venice"), Charles Euphrasie Kuwasseg, and Louis Pinel de Grandchamp.

== Library ==
The Athenaeum's library shares a unified catalog and circulation system with over 50 other Vermont libraries through the Vermont Organization of Koha Automated Libraries.

== See also ==
- National Register of Historic Places listings in Caledonia County, Vermont
- List of National Historic Landmarks in Vermont
