= Helen Day Memorial Library and Art Center =

Coordinates: 44.46389°N 72.68466°W

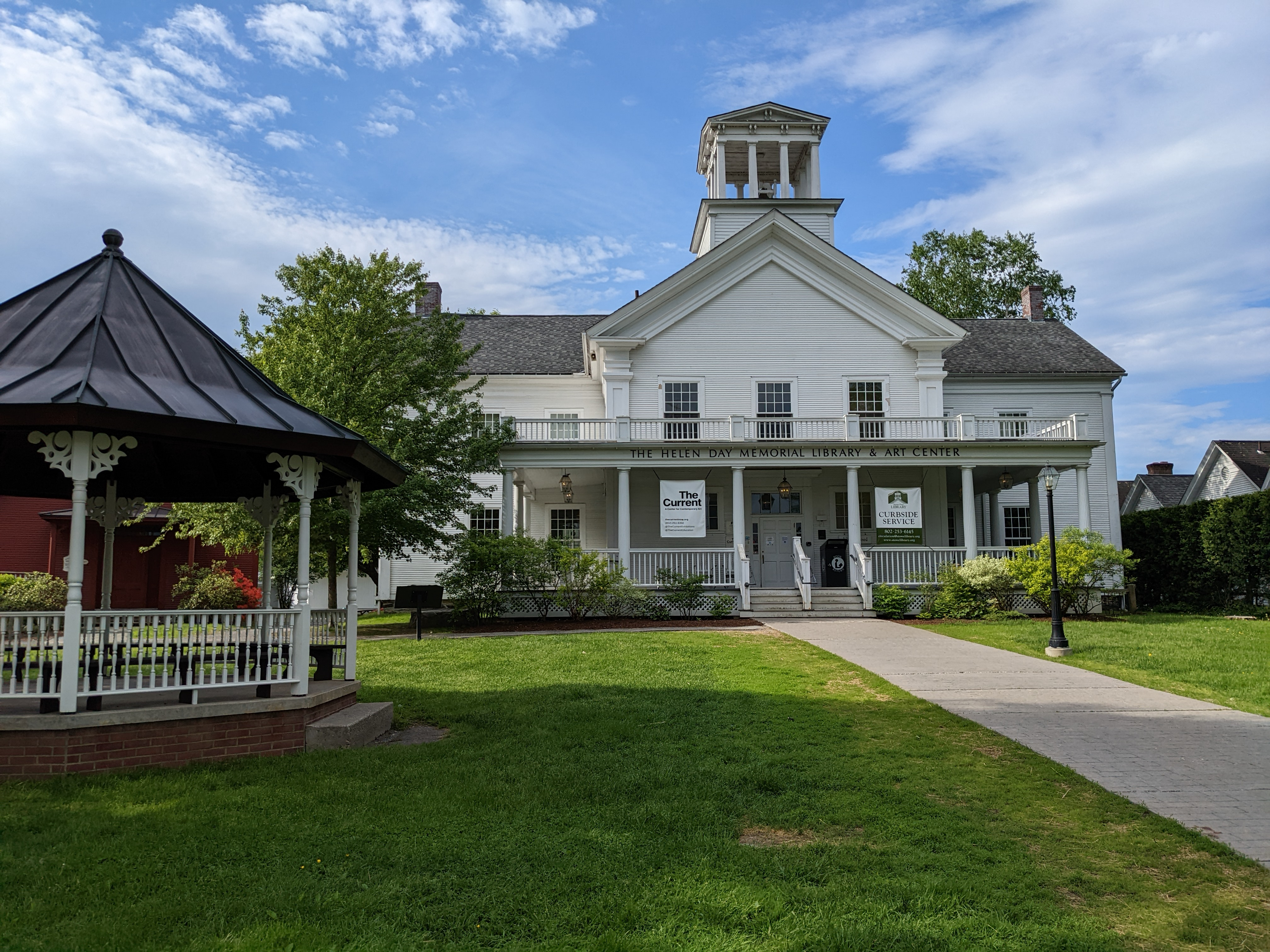
- The Helen Day Memorial Library and Art Center building
- Established: 1981 (45 years ago)
- Location: 90 Pond Street; Stowe, Vermont, United States
- Type: Art Center and Public Library
- Directors: Rachel Moore, The Current; Loren Polk, The Stowe Free Library
- Website: https://www.thecurrentnow.org/ and https://www.stowelibrary.org/about.html

Helen Day Memorial Library and Art Center is a historic building located in Stowe, Vermont, United States. The building houses The Current, a non-profit contemporary arts and education organization, and the Stowe Free Library.

== Structure ==
The building which was built in 1863 as Stowe Village School, is an example of Greek Revival building. It was later used exclusively for upper grades before being abandoned in 1974 when a new high school was built away from the town center. Thanks to a bequest from Helen Day Montanari and the efforts of local preservationists, the building—once known as "Old Yeller"—was restored in 1981 to accommodate both the Stowe Free Library and the Helen Day Art Center (now known as The Current). A major addition to the building was completed in 1994 through local community support, and a modest interior renovation was carried out in 2002 with a grant from the Freeman Foundation of Stowe.

The establishment of the building was made possible by a bequest from Helen Day Montanari and Marguerite E. Lichtenthaeler. Dr. Lichtenthaeler moved to Stowe, Vermont, with Montanari and established a medical practice, continuing to see patients until the age of eighty. Helen Day Montanari, originally from Boston, Massachusetts, shared intellectual interests and a love of travel with Lichtenthaeler, and both women were deeply concerned with the quality of life in their community. Dr. Lichtenthaeler actively supported library appropriations at town meetings, and Montanari left a $40,000 trust upon her death in 1955 for the creation of an art center and a library. Later, a successful campaign raised the remaining funds necessary for the Stowe Free Library and the Helen Day Art Center.

== The Current ==
Established in 1981, The Current hosts exhibitions of visual art by both internationally and nationally recognized artists, as well as local Vermont artists. One of its hallmark events is "Exposed," an annual outdoor sculpture exhibit. In addition to exhibitions, The Current offers art classes in various media for both youth and adults, as well as guided tours, extensive public programs, and access to a free hands-on room and Art Lounge.

== Stowe Free Library ==
Stowe's earliest libraries were subscription-based or membership libraries, common in the early 19th century. In 1866, the Stowe Free Library was founded with a donation of 51 books from visiting summer artists, supplemented by a $100 town appropriation. Stowe became the first town in Vermont to appropriate funds for a library under the 1865 state law.

After moving between several locations, the library found a long-term home in 1904 in the “new” town hall, the Akeley Memorial Building. Seventy-seven years later, it moved to the renovated old high school building at the corner of Pond and School Streets.

The library is operated as a municipal department of the Town of Stowe and is about 90 percent funded by taxes. The remaining income comes from endowment interest, fees, fines, donations, and proceeds from an annual book sale.

== Timeline ==
- 1863: The Greek Revival village school was built and counterpoint to the Stowe Community Church. They shared the same architect
- 1900: Second-story wings added
- 1955: Helen Day Montanari died and left a trust fund in the care of her friend, Dr. Marguerite Lichtenthaeler. The two women shared a dream of a new library and art center for Stowe
- 1974: Stowe High School moved into its new quarters on the Barrows Road. The village school, colloquially known as "Old Yeller", was left vacant
- 1980: Restoration of the vacant school begun. It was to be reincarnated as the Helen Day Memorial Library and Art Center and officially registered on the National Register of Historic Sites
- 1981: The Stowe Free Library officially moved into the first floor of the new building
- 1982: The Helen Day Art Center was officially incorporated and registered with the Secretary of State as a non-profit corporation
- 1994: New additions made
- 2021: The Current: A Center for Contemporary Art moved into the second floor of the building
- 2021: A rebranding exercise changed the official name of the organization to The Current, Inc.
