= Lawrence Memorial Library (Climax, Michigan) =

- Climax Post Office Building
- U.S. National Register of Historic Places
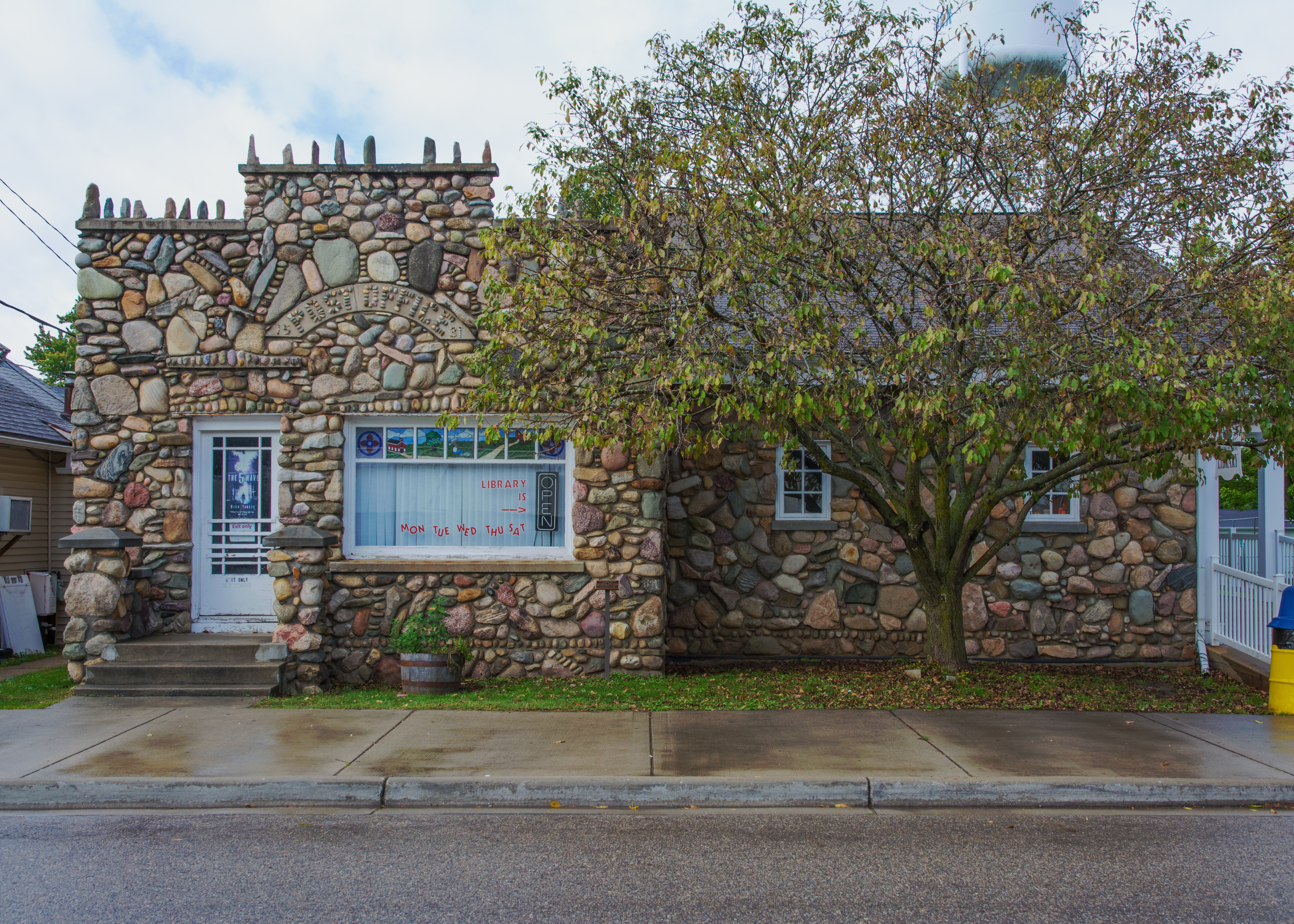
- Old Climax, Mi Post Office, which is now a library

- Location within Michigan Location within the United States
- Interactive map
- Location: 107 N. Main St., Climax, Michigan
- Coordinates: 42.2386°N 85.3361°W
- Built: 1931
- Built by: Willis L. Lawrence, Laverne Harman
- NRHP reference No.: 99000053
- Added to NRHP: January 27, 1999

The Lawrence Memorial Library is a historic library located at 107 North Main Street in Climax, Michigan. The building was originally constructed to house a post office. It was listed on the National Register of Historic Places in 1999.

== History ==
The first post office in Climax was opened in 1836. The area remained unincorporated until the end of the 19th century. In 1896, the first Rural Free Delivery service in Michigan was begun in Climax; one of the original carriers was Willis L. Lawrence. Lawrence continued to work as a carrier; however, the post office had no permanent home. In 1931, Lawrence took it upon himself to construct this building as a permanent post office. Willis did most of the work himself, with mason Laverne Harman doing the stonework. Once completed, Lawrence rented it to the Post Office for a nominal fee. Lawrence retired in 1934, and died in 1935. His widow, Jette, continued to lease the building to the post office. When Jette died in 1963, the Lawrence estate gave the building Village of Climax, with the stipulation that it be used as a public library and local history repository.

A new post office was quickly constructed across the street, and the old post office was remodeled. In 1964, the Lawrence Memorial Library was dedicated. Additions were made to the building in 1975 and 1989/90. The building is also used by the Prairie Historical Society.

== Description ==
The Lawrence Memorial Library is a one-story, flat-roofed, wood-frame structure with a fieldstone exterior. The original building measures 28 feet by 30 feet. It has decorative lintels formed with small stones set vertically; the front also features a decorative crenelation effect across the top. Two additions are attached to the building: a 1975, 24-foot by 24-foot, "English Tudor" style room on one side, and a 1990, 1300-square-feet Neo-Greek Revival style room at the rear.

== See also ==
- List of United States post offices
