= Bradford Public Library =

- Bradford City Hall-Byers Masonic Lodge
- U.S. National Register of Historic Places
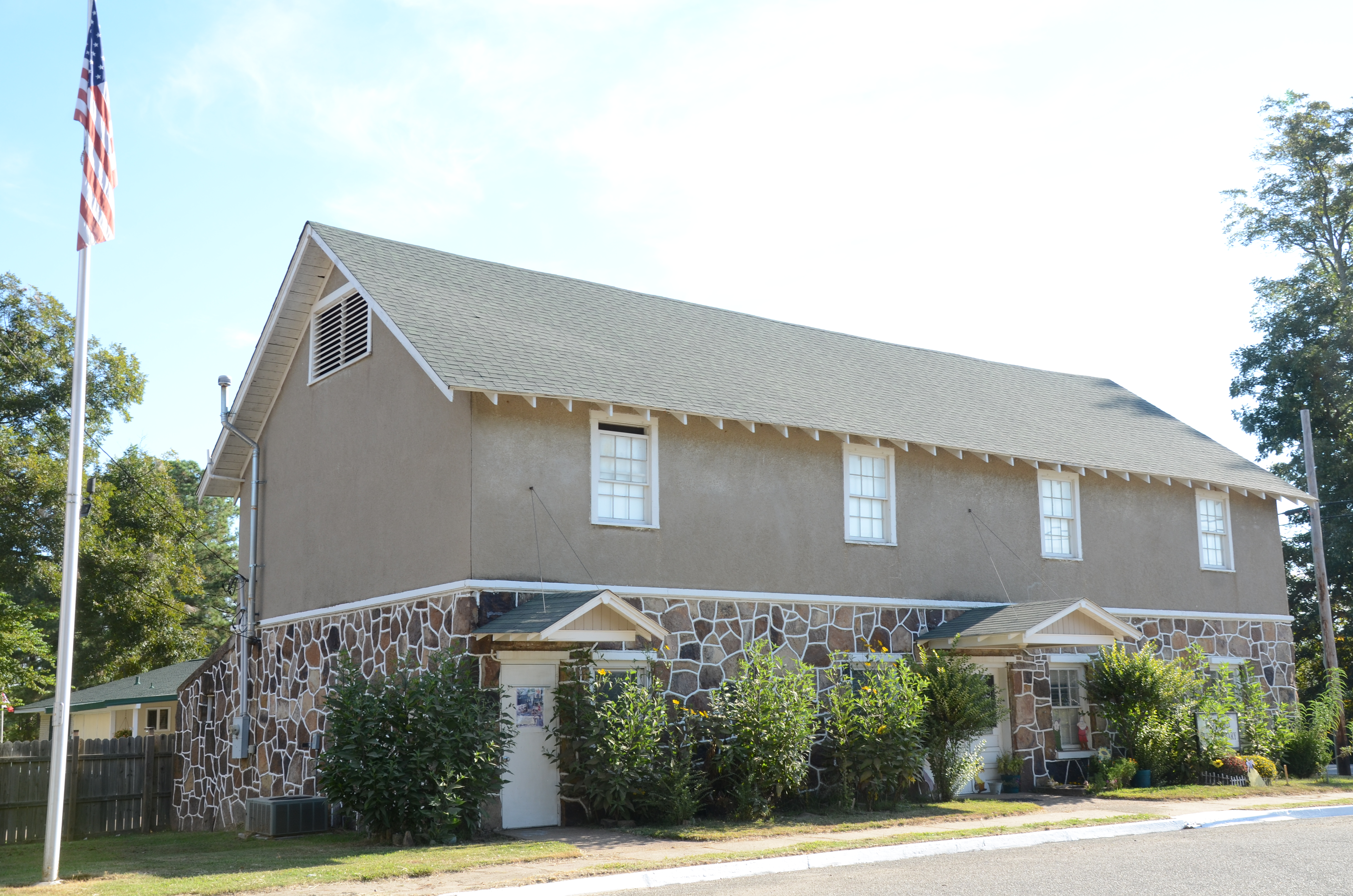

- Location within Arkansas Location within the United States
- Location: 302 W. Walnut St., Bradford, Arkansas
- Coordinates: 35°25′27″N 91°27′19″W
- Area: 0.9 acres (0.36 ha)
- Architect: C.H. Nichols, S. Wilson, Claud Smith
- Architectural style: Bungalow/Craftsman
- NRHP reference No.: 99001260
- Added to NRHP: October 21, 1999

Bradford Public Library, formerly known as the Byers Masonic Lodge and Bradford City Hall, is a historic building in Bradford, Arkansas. Built in 1934 jointly by the Masonic lodge and the city government, the building originally functioned as the city hall and as a Masonic Hall until the lodge moved in 1960. The city hall later moved in 1995. The building was listed on the National Register of Historic Places in 1999, and has been used as a library since 2009.

The building is a two-story structure finished in fieldstone on the first level and stucco on the second. Its gable roof has exposed rafter ends, giving the building a bit of Craftsman styling.

== See also ==
- National Register of Historic Places listings in White County, Arkansas
