= Search/Retrieve via URL =

Search protocol for Internet search queries

Search/Retrieve via URL (SRU) is a standard search protocol for Internet search queries, utilizing Contextual Query Language (CQL), a standard query syntax for representing queries.

SRU, along with the related Search/Retrieve via Web (SRW) service, were created by as part of the ZING (Z39.50 International: Next Generation) initiative as successors to the Z39.50 protocol.

== Example usage ==
Sample code of a complete answer for this SRU Query-URL with URL query version=1.1&operation=searchRetrieve&query=dc.title=Darwinism and CQL query dc.title=Darwinism:

<?xml version="1.0"?>
<sru:searchRetrieveResponse xmlns:sru="https://www.loc.gov/zing/srw/" xmlns:diag="https://www.loc.gov/zing/srw/diagnostic/" xmlns:xcql="https://www.loc.gov/zing/cql/xcql/" xmlns:dc="http://purl.org/dc/elements/1.1/">
  <sru:version>1.1</sru:version>
  <sru:numberOfRecords>4</sru:numberOfRecords>
  <sru:records>
    <sru:record>
      <sru:recordSchema>info:srw/schema/1/dc-v1.1</sru:recordSchema>
      <sru:recordPacking>XML</sru:recordPacking>
      <sru:recordData>
        <sru:dc>
          <sru:title>Darwinism</sru:title>
          <sru:creator>Dennett</sru:creator>
          <sru:subject>The rule of the Local is a basic principle of Darwinism -  it corresponds to the principle that there is no Creator, no intelligent foresight. I 262</sru:subject>
        </sru:dc>
      </sru:recordData>
      <sru:recordNumber>1</sru:recordNumber>
    </sru:record>
    <sru:record>
      <sru:recordSchema>info:srw/schema/1/dc-v1.1</sru:recordSchema>
      <sru:recordPacking>XML</sru:recordPacking>
      <sru:recordData>
        <sru:dc>
          <sru:title>Darwinism</sru:title>
          <sru:creator>McGinn</sru:creator>
          <sru:subject>Design argument/William Paley: organisms have a brilliant design: We have not designed them, so we have to assume that a foreign intelligence did it. Let s call this intelligence "God". So God exists. II 98
DarwinVsPaley: intelligent design does not require a Creator. Selection is sufficient. II 98
Mind/consciousness/evolution/McGinn: evolution does not explain consciousness! nor sensations. II 99
 Reason: sensation and consciousness cannot be explained through the means of Darwinian principles and physics, because if selection were to explain how sensations are supposed to be created by it, it must be possible to mold the mind from matter. II 100
 (s) Consciousness or sensations would have to be visible for selection! (Similar GouldVsDawkins)</sru:subject>
        </sru:dc>
      </sru:recordData>
      <sru:recordNumber>2</sru:recordNumber>
    </sru:record>
    <sru:record>
      <sru:recordSchema>info:srw/schema/1/dc-v1.1</sru:recordSchema>
      <sru:recordPacking>XML</sru:recordPacking>
      <sru:recordData>
        <sru:dc>
          <sru:title>Darwinism</sru:title>
          <sru:creator>Putnam</sru:creator>
          <sru:subject>Rorty: Darwinism / Putnam: he does noit like the image of man as a more complicated animal  (scientistic and reductionist physicalism).
Rorty VI 63</sru:subject>
        </sru:dc>
      </sru:recordData>
      <sru:recordNumber>3</sru:recordNumber>
    </sru:record>
    <sru:record>
      <sru:recordSchema>info:srw/schema/1/dc-v1.1</sru:recordSchema>
      <sru:recordPacking>XML</sru:recordPacking>
      <sru:recordData>
        <sru:dc>
          <sru:title>Darwinism</sru:title>
          <sru:creator>Rorty</sru:creator>
          <sru:subject>Darwinism/Rorty provides a useful vocabulary. "Darwinism": for me is a fable about human beings as animals with special skills and organs. But these organs and skills are just as little in a representational relation to the world as the anteater s snout. VI 69 ff
Darwinism/Rorty: it demands that we consider our doing and being as part of the same continuum, which also includes the existence of amoebae, spiders and squirrels. One way to do that is to say that our experience is just more complex. VI 424</sru:subject>
        </sru:dc>
      </sru:recordData>
      <sru:recordNumber>4</sru:recordNumber>
    </sru:record>
  </sru:records>
</sru:searchRetrieveResponse>

== See also ==
- Search/Retrieve Web Service
