= PMB (software) =

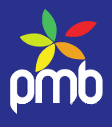
- Logo PMB
- Developer: PMB Services
- Initial release: October 2003; 22 years ago
- Stable release: 7.4.1 / 25 January 2022; 3 years ago
- Repository: forge.sigb.net/redmine/projects/pmb/files
- Written in: PHP
- Operating system: Linux, Windows, Mac OS
- Available in: English, French, Spanish, Italian, Arabic, Dutch and Portuguese
- Type: Integrated library system
- License: CECILL-2.0 (Note: Version 2.0 dated 2005-05-21.)
- Website: www.sigb.net

PMB is a fully featured open source integrated library system. It is continuously developed and maintained by the French company PMB Services.

== Features ==
PMB follows the rules of the library science. The software provides 4 essential features :

- the library management,
- the watch and the documentary products,
- the publication of editorial content
- the electronic document management.

It provides an integrated portal of news and management of Web 2.0 content and is the only ILS that doesn't use a third-party CMS for the management of the portal.

It is multilingual (100% English & French, 80% Spanish and Italian) and even supports Arabic (translation and UTF8 support) since its 3.0.5 version of November 2006. The latest 4.2 version of July 2015 includes a watch unit (Watch&Share) and allows geo-referencing of the collections and several other improvements to the software.

=== Size ===
The software is used with collections up to around 500 000 records. Tests are done with 2 million records to show its capacity to manage bigger collections. It is regularly installed in public libraries networks of 10 to 15 sites.

=== Interoperability ===
PMB allows to use the Z39.50 protocol (in order to import bibliographic records that can be directly integrated in the database from different servers). It manages the UNIMARC cataloguing format and the ISO 2709 record exchange format. It also includes the XML data format. PMB is also OAI server and client. The user's database can be connected to an LDAP directory or any other base of users reachable by web services. It has an API allowing to integrate it into an existing information system. The integration of PMB into a Virtual Learning Environment (VLE) is functional in many French academies.

=== Units/Modules ===
PMB is divided in two modules: the management module and the portal module (or OPAC). The management module includes specific functions for the librarian: circulation (loan/return), catalogue, authorities, editions, SDI (Selective Dissemination of the Information and the watch module Watch&Share), acquisitions, CMS and administration. PMB comes with a user request management feature since 2009. It can, moreover, be completed by the preset addition of an extensions module. At the start, the software was providing a specialized user interface on the catalogue : the OPAC. An improvement to the software in 2012 added a CMS feature offering the ability to make highly customizable portals.

== Requirements ==
It is a web application, based on a web server platform (Apache, Microsoft IIS) + PHP + MySQL or MariaDB, which can therefore work on Linux, Mac OS X or Microsoft Windows .

PMB has its own search engine, supporting phonetic searches without needing any complementary search engine.

PMB is written using PHP programming language. It requires:

- PHP
- Apache web server
- MySQL database
- Web browser

== Documentary languages ==
PMB can integrate different sorting plans: DEWEY, UDC, PCDM or any other custom sorting plan. It includes the management of several thesauri, a feature that is actually in use with thesauri such as: PRISME, BDSP, MOTBIS, DELPHES, Thesaurus du Management, Vie culturelle, etc. It comes with a management of concepts allowing it to respect the ISO 25964-1 standard and therefore the use of indexation languages like RAMEAU or MeSH. It also allows the total implementation of the FRBR model.

== Users ==
PMB is used by big institutions such as local communities, ministries, the constitutional council, regional councils, metro-poles, the Academy of Rennes and every documentation center of Brittany.

Many public libraries networks, secondary schools, the ONISEP (a French work and study information institute) and the INSEE have chosen the software PMB.

The group Radio France has joined the community of PMB users in 2015 for an FRBR migration of its library (including musical partitions).

PMB also equips private groups such as law offices, Grandes écoles, internationally known fashion groups etc.

According to the annual survey of Livres-Hebdo, PMB was the third Integrated library system in France in 2005 in terms of number of installations with 165 installations. Next years' surveys showed the fast progression of the free software in many structures. Since 2011, PMB Services refuses to take part to this survey : the numbers given to Marc Maisonneuve weren't correctly reused and there was an amalgam made with the software BCDI, yet not a free software.

On 1 January 2015, there was more than 6 000 operational installations in the world, for collections sizes going from 300 records to 500 000. Big companies such as Alstom or Orange S.A. now use more free solutions such as PMB. Since 2012, the software is running in a higher education network in Belgium, HENAM-HENALLUX, with more than 400 000 online searchable records.

In France, PMB Services claims to have more than 1 800 clients. The company's official website lists most of them and links their online catalogues.

== History ==
In its early beta stages, the software was known as PhpMyBibli. It was launched in October 2002 by François Lemarchand, director of the Library of Agneaux. The core cataloguing system and foundational application framework were developed during autumn 2002, followed shortly thereafter by the addition of a serials management module.

In 2003, Eric Robert, an IT engineer and advocate of free software, joined François Lemarchand in the development of the project. Robert contributed significantly to the software's evolution by implementing the loan module, UNIMARC import functionality, statistical reporting features, and a Z39.50 client.

Version 1.0 of the software was officially released in December 2003 during an international conference in Rabat, marking its transition into a full-fledged integrated library system (ILS). That same year, the OPAC interface was introduced, developed by Gautier Michelin and Christophe Bliard.

The developers most actively involved at the time—Eric Robert, Gautier Michelin, and Florent Tétart—subsequently established the company PMB Services to professionalize the project. PMB Services offers training and installation services, both on-premise and hosted, as well as support for software deployment, including SaaS options, data migration and recovery, configuration, user training, and portal design.

The first library to implement PMB was the library of Bueil-en-Touraine in France. As of version 4.1, the software had been downloaded over 38,000 times. Version 4.2 was released on 24 July 2015 and had recorded 2,272 downloads by 15 September of that year.

== Development ==
PMB was initially licensed under GNU General Public License, which ensures the free availability of the software. Wiki, mailing lists and BerliOS hosting facilities allow communication between PMB developers and users. PMB is now licensed under CECILL free licence, that ensures legal security in France and other countries with similar legal systems.

== See also ==
- List of free and open source software packages
