= Cathy Delneo =

American librarian and swimmer

Catherine Delneo is an American librarian, the State Librarian of Vermont.

Prior to this role, Delneo was the chief of branches at the San Francisco Public Library, a system in which she started working in 2006. Her first professional job was at the Somerset County Library System in Bridgewater, New Jersey, where she was a librarian for children and teens and later worked as a training coordinator for the system. Delneo began serving as Vermont's State Librarian in February 2022; in this position, she helps support the state's network of approximately 185 public libraries as well as hundreds of school libraries. As the state librarian, Delneo is also the commissioner of the Vermont Department of Libraries, overseeing a budget of $3.2 million in 2022.

Delneo was born and raised in South Burlington, Vermont. She attended Rice High School. She has a Bachelor of Arts in philosophy from Vassar College and a Master of Library and Information Science from Rutgers University. She played cello in the Vermont Youth Orchestra from grades 6 through 12. She is also an avid open water swimmer and ice swimmer. She was the first woman documented to complete a round trip swim around Angel Island in San Francisco in 2013, and has circumnavigated Manhattan in a 12-hour marathon.

Delneo has emphasized the role of libraries in providing access to information and technology, especially for people who do not have a computer or internet connections at home. She has also stated that she wants to make the libraries more accessible so that everyone feels welcome.
