= Vermont Department of Libraries =

Official State Library of Vermont

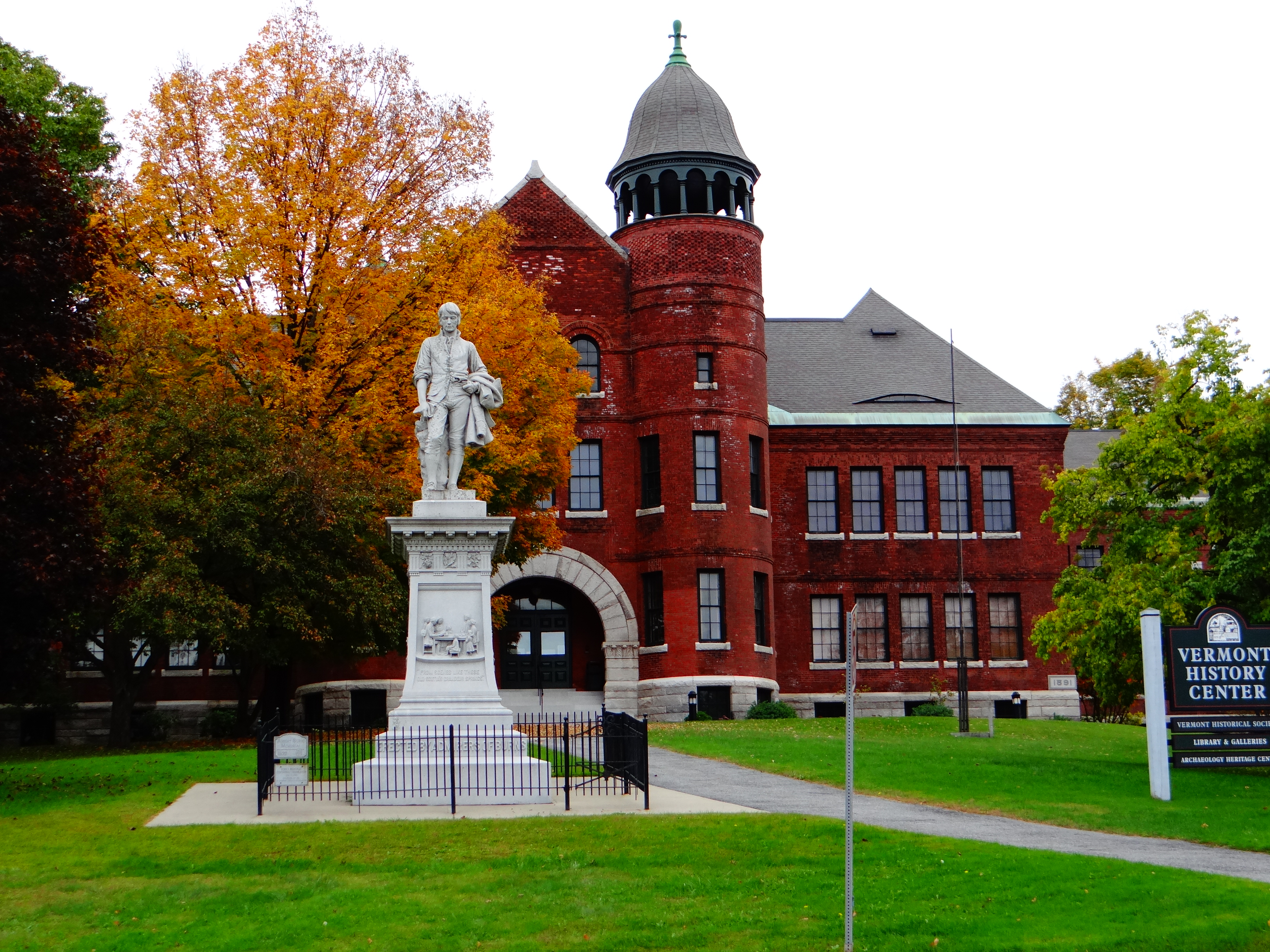

Agency overview
- Formed: March 31, 1970
- Preceding agencies: Vermont State Library; Free Public Library Service
- Jurisdiction: State of Vermont
- Headquarters: 60 Washington Street; Barre, VT 05642
- Agency executive: Catherine Delneo, State Librarian
- Parent agency: Agency of Administration
- Website: libraries.vermont.gov

The Vermont Department of Libraries Is the official state library agency of Vermont located in Barre, Vermont. It is a department under Vermont's Agency of Administration.

== History ==
The State Library came into existence in 1825 when Robert Pierpoint a member of the Council of Censors introduced a resolution for the state to appoint a person to take care of the state's collection of books and public documents. The library was originally only for public documents, legal books and publications for the Supreme Court and legislature. In 1854 the State Librarian received a $200 appropriation to buy books of his choosing.

Until 1969 the state had two library agencies: the State Library, and the Free Public Library Service which ran a series of regional libraries and a bookmobile service. The two units were merged into the Department of Libraries on March 31, 1970. The State Librarian is appointed by the Governor. The State Librarian is advised by a Board of Libraries, the seven members of which are also appointed by the Governor.

== Building ==
The State Library was originally housed inside the Vermont State House. In 1857 the State House burned and the items remaining at the State Library were relocated to a private home before moving back in to the rebuilt State House, and then to its own building. The State Library building was built in 1918 and was located at 111 State St in Montpelier Vermont in a space it shared with the state Supreme Court. The 1927 Flood destroyed nearly 50,000 documents belonging to the State Library. The library later moved next door to 109 State Street (the Pavilion), and in 2018 relocated to Barre, Vermont at the site of the old Spaulding school building in a space it shares with the Vermont Historical Society.

== State Librarians ==
Year	Name
2022–present	Cathy Delneo
2019–2021	Jason Broughton
2017-2019	Scott Murphy
2008-2017	Martha Reid
1997-2008	Sybil McShane
1977-1997	Patricia Klinck
1973-1977	John McCrossan
1972-1973	Kathryn R. Nelson
1969-1972	James Igoe
1967-1969	Marion Burns
1954-1967	Lawrence Turgeon
1925-1952	Harrison Conant
1902-1925	George Wing
1873-1902	Hiram Huse
1858-1873	Charles Reed
1856-1857	Harvey Webster
1855	Charles Herbert Joyce
1853-1854	Frederick Hovey
1849-1852	George Nichols
1848	Cornelius Carpenter
1845-1847	Gustavus Loomis
1842-1844	Asa W. Kenney
1840-1841	A.D. Arms
1839-1840	Jackson Vail
1835-1836	Herman Carpenter
1834-1835	Harrison Page
1832-1833	Farrand F. Merrill
1825-1830	Calvin Keith (unsalaried)

== See also ==
- List of libraries in the United States
