= ByWater Solutions =

Open source software company

ByWater Solutions LLC
- Type: Private
- Industry: Computer software
- Founded: 2009
- Headquarters: Santa Barbara, CA; New Haven, CT, USA
- Products: Koha (Support)
- Website: www.bywatersolutions.com

ByWater Solutions is a privately owned and funded company founded in California in March 2009 by CEO Brendan A. Gallagher and CRO Nathan A. Curulla, which provides full-service support, implementation, hosting, training, and development services for open source services including the Koha Integrated Library System, Aspen Discovery, Libki and Metabase.

== History ==
After the founding of ByWater Solutions in 2009, Gallagher began contributing to the Koha community by way of small developmental fixes. ByWater signed their first contract in June 2009. Since that time, ByWater has grown to a over 50 employees, and supports over 3,000 library sites (including public, school, academic, small non profits and special libraries) around the world. Since its founding, ByWater has also partnered with other open source software companies worldwide to work on improving the Koha, Aspen Discovery and Libki projects both with documentation and developments.

=== Origin of the company name ===
ByWater Solutions is named after a village in J. R. R. Tolkien's epic trilogy The Lord of the Rings. Bywater is a village which is situated near the Shire, the home of Bilbo and Frodo Baggins, who are the two main characters in the story. Bywater was known primarily for the Inn of the Green Dragon, a central meeting place for travelers and adventurers in the story. The Inn was a hub for the collaboration and exchange of news and ideas in the world of Middle Earth, and thus resembles the environment found in Koha and Open Source Software in general. Because of the company's primary dealings with libraries worldwide, the founders thought that it was important to incorporate a literary reference to the name of the company, and being lifelong childhood friends, this literary work has personal value to them both.

=== Partnerships ===
In March 2015, EBSCO Information Services and ByWater Solutions partnered together to allow libraries that use Koha ILS to easily integrate EBSCO Discovery Service. ByWater has expressed their commitment to support the FOLIO Library Services Platform project in partnership with Ebsco. As of July 2023 this partnership has been terminated and ByWater's involvement in FOLIO has been reduced drastically as a result.

In October of 2023, Nick Dimant, one of the original founders of Open Fifth (formerly PTFS Europe), and Ian Bays retired as shareholders and Directors of PTFS Europe. Their outstanding shareholding was purchased by Brendan Gallagher and Nathan Curulla, who joined the board as Directors.
