= Invenio =

Digital library software

- Original author: CERN
- Developers: CERN and external contributors
- Release: 30 June 2006; 20 years ago
- Stable release: 3.1.0 / 12 March 2019; 7 years ago
- Written in: Python, JavaScript
- Operating system: Unix-like, macOS
- Available in: Multi-lingual
- Type: Institutional repository, digital library, digital asset management (DA), research data management, integrated library system
- License: MIT
- Website: inveniosoftware.org
- Repository: github.com/inveniosoftware/invenio

Invenio is a software framework for large-scale digital repositories that provides the tools for managing digital assets in an institutional repository and research data management systems. The software is typically used for open access repositories for scholarly and/or published digital content and as a digital library. It is free and open source software released under an MIT License and freely available for download.

Invenio was initially developed by the European Organization for Nuclear Research (CERN) with both individual and organisational external contributors.

== History ==
Before 1 July 2006, the package was named CDSware, then renamed CDS Invenio, and now known simply as Invenio.

== Standards ==
Invenio complies with standards such as the Open Archives Initiative metadata harvesting protocol (OAI-PMH) and uses JSON/JSONSchema as its underlying bibliographic format.

== Support ==
The service provider TIND Technologies, an official CERN spin-off based in Norway, offers Invenio via a software-as-a-service model. TIND presents itself as focused on library technologies.

Variants of Invenio are offered by TIND for library services as TIND ILS, DA, IR and RDM under a fully hosted and open-core model.

== Users ==
Invenio is used outside of its original home within CERN, including SLAC National Accelerator Laboratory, Fermilab, and the École Polytechnique Fédérale de Lausanne. SPIRES migrated to Invenio in October 2011 with the INSPIRE-HEP site, a joint effort of CERN, DESY, SLAC and FNAL.

In 2014, the package was chosen to be the digital library software of all national universities in the western Africa regional economic community UEMOA which includes eight countries: Benin, Burkina Faso, Côte d'Ivoire, Guinea-Bissau, Mali, Niger, Senegal, Togo.

The research data repository Zenodo at CERN is basically run under Invenio v3, wrapped by a small extra layer of code that is also named Zenodo. To simplify reuse of the Zenodo codebase, several institutions have joined in 2019 to distribute an institution-agnostic package under the name of InvenioRDM.

The German Federal Archives (Bundesarchiv) use Invenio for its record keeping software.

== See also ==
- Digital library
- Institutional repository
