= Koha (software) =

Open source integrated library system

- Original author: Katipo Communications
- Developer: Koha Community
- Release: January 2000; 26 years ago
- Stable release: Koha 26.05.00 / 26 May 2026; 5 months ago
- Written in: Perl, JavaScript
- Operating system: Linux
- Available in: 26 languages
- Type: Integrated library system
- License: GPL-3.0-or-later
- Website: koha-community.org
- Repository: git.koha-community.org/Koha-community/Koha

Koha is an open-source integrated library system (ILS), used world-wide by public, school and special libraries, but also in some larger academic libraries. The name comes from a Māori term for a gift or donation.

== Features ==
Koha is a web-based ILS, with a SQL database (MariaDB or MySQL preferred) back end with cataloguing data stored in MARC and accessible via Z39.50 or SRU. The user interface is very configurable and adaptable and has been translated into many languages. Koha has most of the features that would be expected in an ILS, including:

- Various Web 2.0 facilities like tagging, comment, social sharing and RSS feeds
- Union catalog facility
- Customizable search
- Online circulation
- Barcode printing
- Patron card creation
- Report generation
- Patron self registration form through OPAC
- Electronic resource management (ERM)

== History ==
Koha was created in 1999 by Katipo Communications for the Horowhenua Library Trust in New Zealand, and the first installation went live in January 2000.

From 2000, companies started providing commercial support for Koha, building to more than 50 today.

In 2001, Paul Poulain (of Marseille, France) began adding many new features to Koha, most significantly support for multiple languages. By 2010, Koha has been translated from its original English into French, Chinese, Arabic and several other languages. Support for the cataloguing and search standards MARC and Z39.50 was added in 2002 and later sponsored by the Athens County Public Libraries. Poulain co-founded BibLibre in 2007.

In 2005, an Ohio-based company, Metavore, Inc., trading as LibLime, was established to support Koha and added many new features, including support for Zebra sponsored by the Crawford County Federated Library System. Zebra support increased the speed of searches as well as improving scalability to support tens of millions of bibliographic records.

In 2007 a group of libraries in Vermont began testing the use of Koha for Vermont libraries. At first a separate implementation was created for each library. Then the Vermont Organization of Koha Automated Libraries (VOKAL) was organized to create one database to be used by libraries. This database was rolled out in 2011. Fifty-seven libraries have chosen to adopt Koha and moved to the shared production environment hosted and supported by ByWater Solutions. Another consortium of libraries in Vermont, the Catamount Library Network has also adopted Koha (also hosted by ByWater Solutions). Previously automated Vermont libraries used software from Follett, or other commercial software vendors.

In 2010 the King's Fund, supported by PTFS Europe, completed their migration to Koha after an extensive feasibility study.

In 2011 the Spanish Ministry of Culture began maintenance of KOBLI, a tailored version of Koha based on an earlier report. The project was concluded in 2018.

In 2014 the Ministry of Culture (Turkey) started to use Koha–Devinim in 1,136 public libraries with more than 17 million items and around 2 million active users. Specialized libraries such as music libraries have adopted Koha because its open-source nature offers easier customization for their particular use cases.

A 2017 Library Technology Reports article claimed that Koha "holds the position as the most widely implemented open source integrated library system (ILS) in the world". According to ohloh (now OpenHub), in 2019 Koha had a "[v]ery large, active development team" and a "[m]ature, well-established codebase", with hundreds of contributors and over 20 monthly contributors each month from 2011 to 2019.

== Dispute with LibLime / PTFS ==
In 2009 a dispute arose between LibLime and other members of the Koha community. The dispute centred on LibLime's apparent reluctance to be inclusive with the content of the sites and the non-contribution of software patches back to the community. A number of participants declared that they believed that LibLime had forked the software and the community. A separate web presence, source code repository and community was established. The fork continued after March 2010, when LibLime was purchased by PTFS.

In November 2011, LibLime announced they had been granted a provisional trademark on the use of the name koha in New Zealand by Intellectual Property Office of New Zealand. The Koha community and Catalyst IT Ltd (NZ) successfully appealed against the provisional trademark grant, with a decision handed down in December 2013 and with LibLime to pay costs.

== Releases ==
Koha releases follow a regular, calendar based, pattern with monthly maintenance releases and bi-annual feature releases.

Current and historic releases
| Version | Release date | Supported until |
|---|---|---|
| 26.05 | 2026-05-27 (stable) | 2027-11 |
| 25.11 | 2025-12-06 (oldstable) | 2027-05 |
| 25.05 | 2025-05-27 (oldoldstable) | 2026-11 |
| 24.11 LTS | 2024-11-26 (oldoldoldstable) | 2028-05 |
| 24.05 | 2024-05-28 | 2025-11 |
| 23.11 | 2023-11-30 | 2025-05 |
| 23.05 | 2023-05-31 | 2024-11 |
| 22.11 LTS | 2022-11-25 | 2026-05 |
| 22.05 | 2022-05-28 | 2023-11 |
| 21.11 | 2021-11-25 | 2023-05 |
| 21.05 | 2021-05-28 | 2022-11 |
| 20.11 | 2020-11-27 | 2022-05 |
| 20.05 | 2020-05-31 | 2021-11 |
| 19.11 | 2019-11-27 | 2022-11 |
| 19.05 | 2019-05-30 | 2020-11 |
| 18.11 | 2018-11-27 | 2020-05 |
Legend: Unsupported Supported Latest version

Each Koha release has a version number that consists of the year and month number of the release. Koha 22.11 was the first release with Long Term Support / LTS.

== Awards ==
- 2000 winner of the Not for Profit section of the 2000 Interactive New Zealand Awards
- 2000 winner of the LIANZA / 3M Award for Innovation in Libraries
- 2003 winner of the public organisation section of the Les Trophées du Libre
- 2004 winner Use of IT in a Not-for-Profit Organisation Computerworld Excellence Awards
- 2014 Finalist Open Source Software Project New Zealand Open Source Awards

== See also ==
- List of free and open-source software packages
