= Integrated library system =

Software for library collections

An integrated library system (ILS), also known as a library management system (LMS), is a type of enterprise resource planning system designed for libraries. It is utilized to track items owned by the library, orders placed, invoices paid, and patrons who have borrowed materials.

An ILS is typically composed of three components: a relational database, software for interacting with that database, and two graphical user interfaces (one for patrons and one for staff). Most ILSes separate software functions into discrete programs, known as modules, with each module integrated with a unified interface. Examples of modules might include:

- acquisitions (ordering, receiving, and invoicing materials)
- cataloging (classifying and indexing materials)
- circulation (lending materials to patrons and receiving them back)
- serials (tracking magazine, journals, and newspaper holdings)
- online public access catalog or OPAC (public user interface)

Each patron and item has a unique ID in the database that allows the ILS to track its activity.

== History ==
=== Pre-computerization ===
Prior to computerization, library tasks were performed manually and independently from one another. Selectors ordered materials with ordering slips, cataloguers manually catalogued sources and indexed them with the card catalog system (in which all bibliographic data was kept on a single index card), fines were collected by local bailiffs, and users signed books out manually, indicating their name on clue cards which were then kept at the circulation desk. Early mechanization came in 1936, when the University of Texas began using a punch card system to manage library circulation. While the punch card system allowed for more efficient tracking of loans, library services were far from being integrated, and no other library task was affected by this change.

=== 1960s: the influence of computer technologies ===
The next big innovation came with the advent of MARC standards in the 1960s, which coincided with the growth of computer technologies – library automation was born. From this point onwards, libraries began experimenting with computers, and, starting in the late 1960s and continuing into the 1970s, bibliographic services utilizing new online technology and the shared MARC vocabulary entered the market. These included OCLC (1967), Research Libraries Group (which has since merged with OCLC), and the Washington Library Network (which became Western Library Network and is also now part of OCLC).

The Intrex Retrieval System ran on CTSS starting in the late 1960s. Intrex was an experimental, pilot-model machine-oriented bibliographic storage and retrieval system with a database that stored a catalog of roughly 15,000 journal articles. It was used to develop and test concepts for library automation. A deployment of three Intrex BRISC CRT consoles for testing at the MIT Engineering Library in 1972 showed that it was preferred over two other systems, ARDS and DATEL.

=== 1970s–1980s: the early integrated library system ===
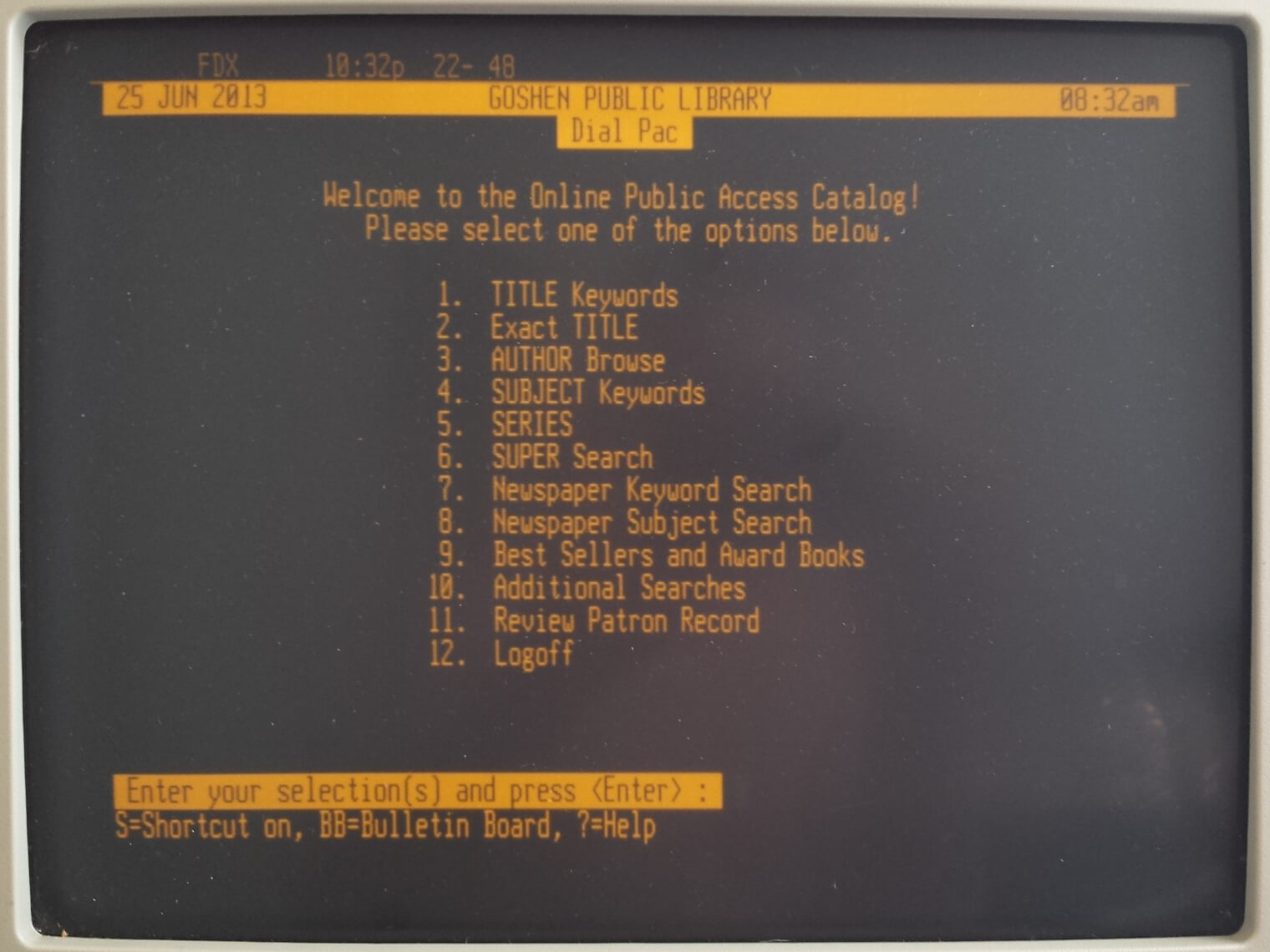
Screenshot of a Dynix menu

The 1970s can be characterized by improvements in computer storage, as well as in telecommunications. As a result of these advances, "turnkey systems on microcomputers", known more commonly as integrated library management systems (ILS) finally appeared. These systems included necessary hardware and software which allowed the connection of major circulation tasks, including circulation control and overdue notices. As the technology developed, other library tasks could be accomplished through ILS as well, including acquisition, cataloguing, reservation of titles, and monitoring of serials.

=== 1990s–2000s: the growth of the Internet ===
With the evolution of the Internet throughout the 1990s and into the 2000s, ILSs began allowing users to more actively engage with their libraries through OPACs and online web-based portals. Users could log into their library accounts to reserve or renew books, as well as authenticate themselves for access to library-subscribed online databases. Education for librarians responded with new focus on systems analysis. Inevitably, during this time, the ILS market grew exponentially. By 2002, the ILS industry averaged sales of approximately US$500 million annually, compared to just US$50 million in 1982.

=== Mid 2000s–present: increasing costs and customer dissatisfaction ===
By the mid to late 2000s, ILS vendors had increased not only the number of services offered but also their prices, leading to some dissatisfaction among many smaller libraries. At the same time, open-source ILS was in its early stages of testing. Some libraries began turning to such open-source ILSs as Koha and Evergreen. Common reasons noted were to avoid vendor lock-in, avoid license fees, and participate in software development. Freedom from vendors also allowed libraries to prioritize needs according to urgency, as opposed to what their vendor can offer. Libraries which have moved to open-source ILS have found that vendors are now more likely to provide quality service in order to continue a partnership since they no longer have the power of owning the ILS software and tying down libraries to strict contracts. This has been the case with the SCLENDS consortium; following the success of Evergreen for the Georgia PINES library consortium, the South Carolina State Library along with some local public libraries formed the SCLENDS consortium in order to share resources and to take advantage of the open-source nature of the Evergreen ILS to meet their specific needs. By October 2011, just 2 years after SCLENDS began operations, 13 public library systems across 15 counties had already joined the consortium, in addition to the South Carolina State Library.

Librarytechnology.org does an annual survey of over 2,400 libraries and noted in 2008 2% of those surveyed used open-source ILS, in 2009 the number increased to 8%, in 2010 12%, and in 2011 11% of the libraries polled had adopted open-source ILSs. The following year's survey (published in April 2013) reported an increase to 14%, stating that "open source ILS products, including Evergreen and Koha, continue to represent a significant portion of industry activity. Of the 794 contracts reported in the public and academic arena, 113, or 14 percent, were for support services for these open source systems."

=== 2010s–present: the rise of cloud based solutions ===
The use of cloud-based library management systems has increased drastically since the rise of cloud technology started. According to NIST, cloud computing can include a variety of "characteristics (e.g. self-service, resource pooling, and elasticity), management models (e.g. service, platform, or infrastructure focus), and deployment models (e.g. public, private)", and this is also true of cloud-based library systems.

== Software criteria ==
=== Distributed software vs. web service ===
Library computer systems tend to fall into two categories of software:

- that purchased on a perpetual license
- that purchased as a subscription service (software as a service).

With distributed software the customer can choose to self-install or to have the system installed by the vendor on their own hardware. The customer can be responsible for the operation and maintenance of the application and the data, or the customer can choose to be supported by the vendor with an annual maintenance contract. Some vendors charge for upgrades to the software. Customers who subscribe to a web (hosted) service upload data to the vendor's remote server through the Internet and may pay a periodic fee to access their data.

=== Data entry assistance based on ISBN ===
Many applications can reduce a major portion of manual data entry by populating data fields based upon the entered ISBN using MARC standards technology via the Internet.

=== Bar code scanning and printing ===
With most software, users can eliminate some manual entry by using a barcode scanner. Some software is designed, or can be extended with an additional module, to integrate scanner functionality. Most software vendors provide some type of scanner integration, and some print bar-code labels.

== Comparison of open-source ILS platforms ==
Software	Developer	Year of release	Year of latest stable release	Written in	Main purpose	License
Koha	Koha Community	2000	2024	Perl	ILS	GPL-3.0-or-later
PMB	PMB development team	2002	2024	PHP	ILS	CECILL-2.0
NewGenLib	Verus Solutions	2005	2024	Java	ILS	GPL
Evergreen	Georgia Public Library Service (GPLS)	2006	2024	Perl, C, XUL	ILS	GPL-2.0-or-later
OpenBiblio	OpenBiblio development team	2002	2024	PHP	ILS	GPL-2.0-or-later
Senayan (perangkat lunak) (Senayan Library Management System (SLiMS))	Senayan Developers Community	2002	2026	PHP	ILS	GPL-3.0-or-later

== See also ==
- Database management system
- Public library ratings
