= Rent-A-Girlfriend season 2 =

2022 Japanese anime season

Rent-A-Girlfriend
- Season 2
- First home media volume cover for the season
- No. of episodes: 12

Release
- Original network: MBS, TBS
- Original release: July 2 – September 17, 2022

Season chronology
- ← Previous; Season 1 Next → Season 3

Rent-A-Girlfriend is a Japanese anime television series based on the manga series of the same name by Reiji Miyajima. The second season featured returning staff and casts, with Studio Comet cooperating in production with TMS Entertainment. The season aired from July 2 to September 17, 2022. (Note: MBS and TBS listed the season premiere as airing on July 1 at 25:25, which is effectively July 2 at 1:25 a.m. JST.) The opening theme song is "Himitsu Koi-Gokoro" (ヒミツ恋ゴコロ; lit. 'Secret Love Heart'), performed by Chico with HoneyWorks, while the ending theme song is "Ienai" (言えない; lit. 'Can't Say'), performed by Miminari featuring Asmi. The season adapts manga content from the 7th volume to the 12th volume (chapters 51–102).

== Episodes ==
No. overall	No. in season	Title (Note: The ruby text glossed over the Japanese episode titles are merely character abbreviations and have no actual significance besides shortening the pronunciation. Despite being officially promoted as part of each title card, they do not appear in the episodes.)	Directed by	Written by	Storyboarded by	Original release date
13	1	"Dream and Girlfriend"; Transliteration: "Yume to Kanojo" (Japanese: 夢と彼女(ユメカノ))	Kazuomi Koga	Mitsutaka Hirota	Kazuomi Koga	July 2, 2022
While in his apartment, Kazuya recalls Chizuru telling him a famous director will be scouting the upcoming play she is in. On the day of the play, Kazuya decides to watch it. Unbeknownst to him, Sumi is also watching it nearby. During the play, which is titled The Heron Princess, Chizuru plays the role of Nene, a kunoichi, and her performance is acclaimed by the audience. Once the play is over with, Sumi attempts to approach Kazuya, but she decides against it. Meanwhile, Chizuru is confident backstage until she learns the director chose to recruit Shiori, who played the role of the princess, due to their long-term friendship. Later that day, Kazuya and Chizuru run into each other. When Chizuru criticizes herself for being talentless, Kazuya tells her how amazing she is. In her apartment, Chizuru receives a call from Umi and Shiori, who praise her performance. She then becomes distraught until she sees Kazuya has set up a date request.
14	2	"The Usual Girlfriend"; Transliteration: "Itsumo no Kanojo" (Japanese: いつもの彼女(オフカノ))	Kyōhei Suzuki	Mitsutaka Hirota	Kyōhei Suzuki	July 9, 2022 (Note: This episode aired at 1:45 a.m. JST, 20 minutes after the regular air time.)
Kazuya hangs out with his friends before he heads to work, where he asks and receives advice from his boss. After work, Kazuya meets up with Chizuru. During their outing, Chizuru tells Kazuya that he has no obligation to keep paying her. She also expresses her concern towards Mami and Ruka. Meanwhile, Kazuya recalls making a promise with Ruka that he could continue dating Chizuru in exchange that he took her to see Chizuru's play. Once her shift is over with, Chizuru decides to take Kazuya to a batting cage. Later that night, they go to the hospital to visit Chizuru's grandmother. While they are alone, her grandmother reveals to Kazuya that despite Chizuru's strong demeanor, she is actually needy and lonely. As such, she asks him to be there for Chizuru. When they head home, Kazuya wonders how he can help Chizuru. Just then, she shows up at his door.
15	3	"The Return of the Girlfriend"; Transliteration: "Sairai no Kanojo" (Japanese: 再来の彼女(サイカノ))	Yoshitsugu Kimura	Rie Uehara	Naoyuki Kuzuya	July 16, 2022
Chizuru reveals she has lost her key before she walks inside Kazuya's apartment. Kazuya becomes flustered about the situation until he sees Chizuru go out onto the balcony to check her backdoor. However, this leads to an awkward moment between the two when he saves her from falling. Just then, Mami unexpectedly shows up, which causes them to hide. Once she finally leaves, Mami wonders where Kazuya was until she realizes she saw Chizuru's purse. Meanwhile, when Chizuru decides to head to the landlord's, Kazuya tells her that she can rely on him if she cannot turn to her parents or friends. This ultimately allows them to open up about their respective family situation and dreams. Sometime later, they briefly run into each other on campus, much to Kazuya's delight. Afterward, he is approached by Mami while he is alone.
16	4	"Night and Girlfriend"; Transliteration: "Yoru to Kanojo" (Japanese: 夜と彼女(バンカノ))	Fumio Maezono	Rie Uehara	Naoyuki Kuzuya	July 23, 2022 (Note: This episode aired at 1:30 a.m. JST, 5 minutes after the regular air time.)
Mami asks Kazuya if she is responsible for him renting Chizuru, which he awkwardly denies. She then tells him that he should get a real girlfriend. Once they part ways, Mami insults Kazuya for lying to her before she approaches Kibe in the hallway. After work, Ruka decides to cook a meal for Kazuya at his apartment. Later on, they learn a typhoon has hit the area. Because of the weather, Ruka stays over for the rest of the night. While they are together, Kazuya notices how cute Ruka is until she inadvertently pulls out a condom. When he tries to go to sleep, she snuggles next to him. As Ruka criticizes herself for being a nuisance, Kazuya admits that while he is elated she told him she likes him, he declines having sex with her. The next morning, Ruka leaves Kazuya's apartment and loudly thanks him for last night. Kazuya is relieved when he believes Chizuru is still asleep. Unbeknownst to him, she heard the whole thing.
17	5	"Birthday and Girlfriend"; Transliteration: "Tanjōbi to Kanojo" (Japanese: 誕生日と彼女(バーカノ))	Shinya Une	Rie Uehara	Shinya Une	July 30, 2022
Three days later, Kazuya and Chizuru run into each other outside where Kazuya notices Chizuru is acting distant. When he returns to his apartment, he learns that Chizuru's birthday is in four days. On Chizuru's birthday, Kazuya decides to rent Sumi. During the outing, he asks her advice in terms of what Chizuru would like for a birthday present. Sumi ultimately takes Kazuya to the roof of a department store. There, it is revealed Chizuru is performing in a hero show. Just before they part ways, Sumi asks Kazuya when is his birthday, which he tells her. Later that night, Chizuru returns home where she finds Kazuya's present, a box of umeboshi, which she enjoys. Meanwhile, Kazuya wonders if he made the right choice.
18	6	"Booze and Girlfriend"; Transliteration: "Sake to Kanojo" (Japanese: 酒と彼女(エンカノ))	Yūki Morita	Mitsutaka Hirota	Masaki Ōzora	August 6, 2022
Kazuya and Chizuru meet outside where Chizuru thanks Kazuya for the birthday present. When he attempts to rent her for the following week, she reveals she will be too busy hanging out with her friends. On campus, Kazuya's friends invite him to a drinking party. Later that night, Kazuya and Chizuru encounter each other at the party, much to their surprise. During the party, Chizuru's friends drunkenly tease her for being an introvert and remove her glasses. However, Kazuya's friends are too drunk to recognize who Chizuru really is. They then play a drinking game where Kazuya realizes that Chizuru will most likely blow her cover due to being a first time drinker. As such, he intentionally loses on her behalf. Once the party is over with, Kazuya is too drunk to move, which results in Chizuru escorting him home. There, she comforts him before he passes out.
19	7	"Ex and Girlfriend"; Transliteration: "Moto Kano to Kanojo" (Japanese: 元カノとカノジョ(トリカノ))	Ken Andō & Fumio Maezono	Rie Uehara	Naoyuki Kuzuya	August 13, 2022
The next morning, a hungover Kazuya cannot remember what happened the previous night. He then heads to school where he hangs out with the group from the drinking party. When he returns home, he discovers Chizuru was indeed in his apartment. At work, Ruka is disappointed to learn that Chizuru does not believe she and Kazuya had sex. Just then, Mami shows up, revealing Kibe told her about Kazuya's job. Once Ruka figures out who Mami is, she calls her out and claims she is Kazuya's girlfriend now. When a stunned Mami later wonders about the situation concerning Kazuya while she is on the train, Chizuru arrives inside holding the same purse Mami saw in Kazuya's apartment. After a tense conversation, they part ways. That night, Mami decides to follow the Twitter account of Kazuya's grandmother.
20	8	"Youth and Girlfriend"; Transliteration: "Seishun to Kanojo" (Japanese: 青春と彼女(コスカノ))	Mizuki Iwadare	Rie Uehara	Kazuomi Koga	August 20, 2022
Kazuya is eating dinner when he receives a call from Ruka, who apologizes for how she acted towards Mami. Elsewhere, Mami engages Kazuya's grandmother on Twitter. Back in Kazuya's apartment, he discovers Chizuru has been promoted. Sometime later, Kazuya and Chizuru have an outing at Tokyo Dome City where both are wearing high school uniforms. After a while, they avoid running into Sumi when they spot her at a clothing store. They then head to an arcade where they have their pictures taken inside a photo booth. However, Kazuya is unable to retrieve them due to Chizuru noticing two girls are wearing the same uniform as her. Once they head back outside, they ride the Ferris wheel. After Kazuya buys the commemorative photo, Chizuru informs him another producer watched the play she was in and has scouted her. Kazuya wonders how he can help her until she achieves her dream.
21	9	"Kiss and Girlfriend"; Transliteration: "Kisu to Kanojo" (Japanese: キスと彼女(ジッカノ))	Yurika Fukaya	Fumi Tsubota	Yurika Fukaya	August 27, 2022
Once Kazuya's grandmother learns Chizuru's birthday has already passed, she decides to turn Kazuya's birthday party into a combined party. When Kazuya invites Chizuru over to his family's house, she informs him that she will arrive there after she visits her grandmother at the hospital. The next day, Kazuya is approached by Ruka when he heads to the party after he inadvertently revealed he was going there with Chizuru. After they show up at his family's house, Ruka uses the opportunity to create a favorable impression. Meanwhile, Chizuru is at the hospital with her grandmother. When she calls Kazuya, Ruka eventually interrupts them to tell her to do not bother coming over. She then receives her grandmother's permission to attend the party. After a while, Chizuru arrives and she pays her respect to the family altar, much to everyone's shock. When Kazuya heads to the bathroom later on, Ruka gives him a kiss.
22	10	"Ring and Girlfriend"; Transliteration: "Yubiwa to Kanojo" (Japanese: 指輪と彼女(リンカノ))	Shūto Yamanaka, Shinya Une & Yurika Fukaya	Fumi Tsubota	Naoyuki Kuzuya	September 3, 2022
After a long, passionate kiss, Ruka tells Kazuya she does not want to lose and she has no regrets. Once they return to the party, Kazuya's grandmother attempts to give Chizuru the family's engagement ring. Realizing the situation has gone out of control, Kazuya decides to tell everyone that he and Chizuru broke up. Just as he is about to do so, Chizuru receives a call from the hospital. When Chizuru, Kazuya, and his grandmother arrive there, Chizuru's grandmother is seemingly fine. However, Chizuru is informed by the doctor that her grandmother does not have much time left. Because of this, Kazuya wants to reveal the truth to her, but Chizuru refuses. Afterward, Kazuya's grandmother gives Chizuru the ring. Sometime later, Kazuya and Ruka have an outing where Ruka announces a truce. That night, while Kazuya wonders what he is supposed to do, Sumi is ready to meet him.
23	11	"Guide and Girlfriend"; Transliteration: "Omotenashi to Kanojo" (Japanese: お饗しと彼女(モテカノ))	Fumio Maezono	Fumi Tsubota	Masaki Ōzora	September 10, 2022
While on their balconies, Chizuru informs Kazuya that Sumi wants to see him. A few days later, he meets up with Sumi where he notices she is wearing a high school uniform, revealing she saw him and Chizuru at Tokyo Dome City. They then head to a marine mammal park. There, Sumi acts as Kazuya's guide. After a while, she takes him to a dolphin show where she attempts to confess her feelings. That night, they head to a popular romantic spot where Kazuya becomes flustered until Sumi hands him a birthday present. When she wonders what is wrong, he reveals the situation concerning Chizuru, which causes them to be emotional. Before they part ways, Kazuya thanks Sumi for having a good time. Once she leaves, he finds the inspiration needed to help Chizuru.
24	12	"Girlfriend and Me"; Transliteration: "Kanojo to Ore" (Japanese: 彼女と俺(イツカノ))	Kazuomi Koga	Mitsutaka Hirota	Kazuomi Koga	September 17, 2022
After another failed audition, Chizuru thinks about her grandfather. In a flashback, her grandfather told her dreams always came true. He then took her to a shrine where he told her about a legend. Once she discovered her grandmother was formerly an actress, Chizuru decided to become one as well. Her ecstatic grandfather promised he was going to watch her. Sometime later, Chizuru was devastated when she found out he got injured in a car accident. Remembering the legend, she went to the shrine to pray for his survival. However, his injuries were too severe. Before he died, her grandfather told her that her dream would come true. Back in the present, Chizuru is distraught when Kazuya arrives at her door to tell her they can make a movie together using crowdfunding so her grandmother can watch it. After a while of contemplating, a tearful Chizuru agrees to do it.

== Home media release ==
=== Japanese ===
DMM.com (Japan – Region 2/A)
Vol.	Episodes	Cover art	Release date	Ref.
1	13–15	Chizuru Mizuhara	October 26, 2022	
2	16–18	Mami Nanami	November 30, 2022	
3	19–21	Ruka Sarashina	December 21, 2022	
4	22–24	Sumi Sakurasawa	January 25, 2023	

=== English ===
Crunchyroll (North America – Region 1/A)
Season	Discs	Episodes	Cover art	Release date	Ref.
2	2	13–24	Chizuru Mizuhara, Mami Nanami, Ruka Sarashina and Sumi Sakurasawa	September 26, 2023	
