= Rent-A-Girlfriend season 3 =

2023 Japanese anime season

Rent-A-Girlfriend
- Season 3
- First home media volume cover for the season
- No. of episodes: 12

Release
- Original network: MBS, TBS
- Original release: July 8 – September 30, 2023

Season chronology
- ← Previous; Season 2 Next → Season 4

Rent-A-Girlfriend is a Japanese anime television series based on the manga series of the same name by Reiji Miyajima. The third season features Shinya Une replacing Kazuomi Koga as director. The season aired from July 8 to September 30, 2023. (Note: MBS and TBS listed the season premiere as airing on July 7 at 25:23, which is effectively July 8 at 1:23 a.m. JST.) The opening theme song is "Renai Miri Film" (恋愛ミリフィルム; lit. 'Love Millimeter Film'), performed by Halca. (Note: "Renai Miri Film" is used as an insert song in episode 48.) The first ending theme song (from episodes 25–31 and 34–36) is "End Roll" (エンドロール), while the second ending theme song (from episodes 32–33) is "End Roll (Ballad Version)" (エンドロール (Ballad Version)), (Note: "End Roll (Ballad Version)" is heard during the end credits of episodes 32 and 33.) both performed by Amber's. The season adapts manga content from the 13th volume to the 19th volume (chapters 105–167).

== Episodes ==
No. overall	No. in season	Title (Note: The ruby text glossed over the Japanese episode titles are merely character abbreviations and have no actual significance besides shortening the pronunciation. Despite being officially promoted as part of each title card, they do not appear in the episodes.)	Directed by	Written by	Storyboarded by	Original release date
25	1	"Home Cooking and Girlfriend"; Transliteration: "Teryōri to Kanojo" (Japanese: 手料理と彼女(オムカノ))	Shinya Une	Mitsutaka Hirota	Shinya Une	July 8, 2023
While Kazuya and Chizuru are having a conversation concerning the flaws of the crowdfunding campaign on their balconies, their new neighbor interrupts them. The next day, Kazuya is on campus when he runs into said neighbor, who introduces herself as Mini Yaemori. Later that night, Chizuru comes over to Kazuya's apartment to talk about the project. When she notices he is hungry, she makes some omurice. Just as Chizuru is ready to leave, Ruka shows up.
26	2	"Girlfriend Next Door"; Transliteration: "Rinshitsu no Kanojo" (Japanese: 隣室の彼女(トナカノ))	Akira Mano	Mitsutaka Hirota	Shinya Une	July 15, 2023 (Note: This episode aired at 1:38 a.m. JST, 15 minutes after the regular air time.)
When Ruka confronts Kazuya and Chizuru, Chizuru is forced to reveal the movie they are making. Ruka agrees to allow them to do it on the condition she gets to help out as well. The next day, Kazuya has a meeting with a representative of the crowdfunding company while Chizuru visits her grandmother at the hospital. Kazuya later tells Chizuru the campaign has been approved. During an outing with Ruka, she sends him a link to a web novel site as a reference for the script. That night, Mini unexpectedly drags Kazuya inside her apartment. When she learns the truth concerning his and Chizuru's relationship, Mini admires Kazuya and calls him her master.
27	3	"Expert and Girlfriend"; Transliteration: "Keikensha to Kanojo" (Japanese: 経験者と彼女(サクカノ))	Kyōhei Suzuki	Mitsutaka Hirota	Yumeko Iwaoka	July 22, 2023
Chizuru approves of the script Kazuya gives her after she reads it. The next day, Kazuya and Chizuru meet up with a fellow college student named Tabuse. While Kazuya is away, Tabuse tells Chizuru the lengths Kazuya went to convince him to join the project. In Kazuya's apartment, Mini decides to help out with the campaign when he reveals it has stalled. During a meeting with Kazuya, Chizuru and Ruka, Mini explains the aspects needed to make the campaign a success. Kazuya later has a hard time handing out flyers for the movie until Sumi joins him. Elsewhere, Mini and Chizuru are collecting backer rewards in Chizuru's apartment before they have a conversation about Kazuya's true feelings for Chizuru.
28	4	"D-Day and Girlfriend"; Transliteration: "Saishūbi to Kanojo" (Japanese: 最終日と彼女(ギリカノ))	Taiki Nishimura	Mitsutaka Hirota	Koichi Ohata	July 29, 2023
Chizuru dismisses Mini's claim that Kazuya loves her. The next morning, Chizuru asks Umi to help with the campaign, while Kazuya and Mini have a conversation about Chizuru. During a meeting with Kazuya and Mini, Chizuru reveals Umi said he will retweet the campaign. She also reveals he has invited her to see a play on the last day of it. Despite his suspicion, Kazuya reluctantly agrees to the arrangement. A week later, Chizuru has an outing with Umi where he makes a pass at her. After she rejects his advances, he asks her if she has fallen in love with Kazuya, which she gives a vague answer. Elsewhere, Kazuya, Mini, and Ruka are handing out flyers when Chizuru joins them. That night, the campaign successfully reaches its goal.
29	5	"Filming and Girlfriend"; Transliteration: "Satsuei to Kanojo" (Japanese: 撮影と彼女(エイガノ))	Yorihide Mada	Rie Uehara	Tetsuji Takayanagi	August 5, 2023
Filming begins during summer break. When Kazuya attempts to get rid of a cicada that is disrupting the shoot, he falls off a bridge and into the river. Nonetheless, the scene is filmed. Once filming resumes, Chizuru tells Kazuya while on a break she has never regretted meeting him. Tabuse later asks Kazuya to go on a trip with Chizuru to film the final scene together. Deciding to approach Mini, she claims she will book a reservation at a resort inn for him, herself, Chizuru, and Ruka. The following Wednesday, Kazuya and Chizuru are at the station where Kazuya receives a call from Mini, who informs him of the plan she concocted to ensure he and Chizuru are alone together. When they arrive in Iiyama, a flustered Chizuru is unable to say anything.
30	6	"Final Scene and Girlfriend"; Transliteration: "Rasuto Shīn to Kanojo" (Japanese: ラストシーンと彼女(ラスカノ))	Akira Mano	Mitsutaka Hirota	Koichi Ohata	August 12, 2023 (Note: This episode aired at 1:28 a.m. JST, 5 minutes after the regular air time.)
Kazuya and Chizuru arrive at the Madarao Resort Hotel where they learn Mini has only reserved a room for two. They later do a test run after scouting the area. Before filming the final scene that night, Chizuru thanks Kazuya for helping her make the movie, explaining why it means so much to her. In their room, Chizuru becomes flustered when she notices Kazuya has fallen asleep. The next morning, a tired Chizuru lays her head on Kazuya's shoulder during a bus ride. Once they are back in Iiyama, they are confronted by Ruka, who reveals she found out about their trip thanks to Mini. While Chizuru is away, Ruka asks Kazuya to promise he will do anything she wants on her birthday.
31	7	"Kazuya and Girlfriend"; Transliteration: "Kazuya to Kanojo" (Japanese: 和也と彼女(ナマカノ))	Kyōhei Suzuki & Naoyuki Kuzuya	Rie Uehara	Kyōhei Suzuki	August 19, 2023
Ruka arrives at Kazuya's apartment to celebrate her birthday. They then head to the pool. Later that night, she becomes annoyed when she discovers he did not get her a gift while they are having dinner. When they head to a seaside park, they have a conversation. Before parting ways, Ruka asks Kazuya if she can address him without an honorific, which he complies. Elsewhere, Sumi notices Chizuru walking inside the hospital to visit her grandmother. While in the waiting room, they run into each other. Once Sumi leaves, Chizuru tells her grandmother the movie's screening is coming up soon. She also reminisces about what Kazuya did during filming. When her grandmother mentions that what she just said is a sign she has fallen in love with Kazuya, Chizuru denies it.
32	8	"Family and Girlfriend"; Transliteration: "Kazoku to Kanojo" (Japanese: 家族と彼女(ツミカノ))	Hidehiko Kadota	Rie Uehara	Masaki Ōzora	September 2, 2023 (Note: Episode 32 was delayed a week from its originally scheduled air date of August 26, 2023.)
Mini is shocked when she learns Kazuya and Chizuru did not have sex during their trip. Chizuru soon comes out of her apartment to talk about the screening. Just then, Ruka shows up and she addresses Kazuya without an honorific in front of Chizuru and Mini. Sometime later, Kazuya, Chizuru, and her grandmother check out the theater where the movie will be screened. After having separate conversations with Kazuya and Chizuru, her grandmother reminisces about what her husband said about Chizuru's dream. Unfortunately, she is rushed back to the hospital following a collapse. There, Chizuru reveals her grandmother does not have much time left. Concerned she is putting on a brave face, Kazuya wonders if they should tell her grandmother the truth about their relationship, which Chizuru refuses. He then leaves once he sees a notification on his phone.
33	9	"Parting and Girlfriend"; Transliteration: "Owakare to Kanojo" (Japanese: お別れと彼女(セイカノ))	Akira Mano	Mitsutaka Hirota	Masaki Ōzora	September 9, 2023
A distraught Chizuru is with her grandmother when Kazuya walks in. Chizuru becomes furious until he projects the movie in the room, which her grandmother watches a portion of. An emotional Chizuru is embraced by her grandmother before they say their goodbyes. Sometime later, Kazuya meets up with Mini where they have a conversation about Chizuru. The next day, Kazuya recalls Chizuru claiming she was fine after her grandmother died. He then attends the wake with his grandmother, who tells him that he needs to be there for Chizuru. That night, he decides to set up a date request.
34	10	"Spontaneous Trip and Girlfriend"; Transliteration: "Toppatsu Ryokō to Kanojo" (Japanese: 突発旅行と彼女(トツカノ))	Hisaya Takabayashi	Rie Uehara	Tetsuji Takayanagi	September 16, 2023
Once Sumi meets up with Kazuya, they head to a café where Kazuya asks for advice in terms of what he should do to help Chizuru. Sumi spontaneously decides to take him to the beach in Fujisawa. When they arrive there, they visit the Enoshima Sea Candle. Later that afternoon, Sumi reveals the reason they went on the trip was to make sure Kazuya had fun. At work, when Kazuya informs Ruka of the death of Chizuru's grandmother, she inadvertently inspires him when she mentions what she wants if she was in Chizuru's situation. As such, he asks his boss if he can get an advance on his pay, which the latter complies. After a while, Kazuya prepares a cheer up date for Chizuru.
35	11	"Girlfriend and Boyfriend"; Transliteration: "Kanojo to Kareshi" (Japanese: 彼女と彼氏(カノカレ))	Akira Mano	Mitsutaka Hirota	Koichi Ohata	September 23, 2023
Once Chizuru meets up with Kazuya, they head to a department store where Kazuya buys a new outfit for Chizuru. After holding hands, they watch a movie together, which Chizuru greatly enjoyed. While they are eating lunch, Chizuru once again claims she is fine before she thanks Kazuya for what he did at the hospital. They then head to the free climbing gym to do some bouldering. Later that evening, they arrive at a restaurant where Chizuru is in a good mood until she sees a young girl with her grandmother. Finally, they head to the park to light some sparklers. While Kazuya goes to get some water, Chizuru reminisces about her grandparents. When Kazuya returns, he notices how distraught Chizuru truly is.
36	12	"Ideal Girlfriend and Girlfriend"; Transliteration: "Risō no Kanojo to Kanojo" (Japanese: 理想の彼女と彼女(カレカノ))	Shinya Une	Mitsutaka Hirota	Shinya Une	September 30, 2023 (Note: This episode aired at 1:43 a.m. JST, 20 minutes after the regular air time.)
Chizuru pretends she is fine when Kazuya approaches her. As she is ready to leave, Kazuya tells her what his ideal girlfriend is. Hearing this causes Chizuru to finally grieve in front of him. The next day, Kazuya and Mini have a conversation about what happened before the former heads out. When he returns, Kazuya runs into a seemingly unfazed Chizuru. Inside her apartment, however, she confesses the truth about her relationship with Kazuya and how lonely she felt to her grandparents' altar. A week later, after the movie is screened, Tabuse reveals to Chizuru how Kazuya was able to show it at the hospital. Kazuya and Chizuru then hang out together. Meanwhile, Ruka puts on a maid outfit, Sumi walks her dog, Mini streams her latest video, and Kibe meets up with Kazuya's grandmother and Mami.

== Home media release ==
=== Japanese ===
DMM.com (Japan – Region 2/A)
Vol.	Episodes	Release date	Cover art	Ref.
1	25–30	November 29, 2023	Chizuru Mizuhara	
2	31–36	December 20, 2023	Chizuru Mizuhara	

=== English ===
Crunchyroll, LLC (North America – Region 1/A)
Season	Discs	Episodes	Cover art	Release date	Ref.
3	2	25–36	Chizuru Mizuhara, Mami Nanami, Ruka Sarashina, Sumi Sakurasawa and Mini Yaemori	September 3, 2024	
