= Rent-A-Girlfriend season 4 =

2025 Japanese anime season

Rent-A-Girlfriend
- Season 4
- Key visual for the fourth season
- No. of episodes: 12

Release
- Original network: MBS, TBS, CBC TV
- Original release: July 5 (Note: Episodes from this season had an advanced streaming release on DMM TV, D Anime Store, and Crunchyroll four days before their televised airings.) – September 20, 2025

Season chronology
- ← Previous; Season 3 Next → Season 5

Rent-A-Girlfriend is a Japanese anime television series based on the manga series of the same name by Reiji Miyajima. In July 2024, a fourth season was announced. The main staff and cast from the previous seasons once again reprised their roles, with Kazuomi Koga returning as director after being absent from the previous season. Originally scheduled to be released in two split cours, the fourth season ended up being released as a single cours, airing from July 5 to September 20, 2025, on the Animeism programming block on MBS, TBS and CBC Television, as well as additional airings days later on RKB, HBC, BS-TBS and AT-X. (Note: MBS and TBS listed the season premiere as airing on July 4 at 26:23, which is effectively July 5 at 2:23 a.m. JST.) The season adapts manga content from the 20th volume through the beginning of the 25th volume (chapters 168–214).

The opening theme song is "Umitsuki", performed by ClariS, while the ending theme song is "Boku no Vega" (ぼくのベガ; lit. 'My Vega'), performed by Regal Lily.

== Episodes ==
No. overall	No. in season	Title (Note: The ruby text glossed over the Japanese episode titles are merely character abbreviations and have no actual significance besides shortening the pronunciation. Despite being officially promoted as part of each title card, they do not appear in the episodes.)	Directed by	Written by	Storyboarded by	Original release date
37	1	"Routine and Girlfriend"; Transliteration: "Nichijō to Kanojo" (Japanese: 日常と彼女(ニッカノ))	Kazuomi Koga	Mitsutaka Hirota	Kazuomi Koga	July 5, 2025
Kazuya is in his apartment before he heads to campus. There, he runs into Kuri and Mini. After class, Kazuya arrives at work where he is greeted by Ruka wearing a maid outfit. While they are alone together, she clings onto him. The next day, they meet up at the local public bath. When he returns to his apartment, Kazuya receives a text message from Chizuru asking if he is free over the weekend. As a result, they ultimately agree to hang out at a café on Saturday morning. On the day of, they have a conversation about Ruka before Chizuru attempts to pay Kazuya back for the cheer up date. Just as Chizuru is ready to leave, Kazuya asks her if she wants some lunch.
38	2	"Sigh and Girlfriend"; Transliteration: "Tameiki to Kanojo" (Japanese: 溜め息と彼女(タメカノ))	Akiko Nakano	Mitsutaka Hirota	Kenichi Kasai	July 12, 2025
After a while of contemplating, Chizuru agrees to have lunch with Kazuya. They then head inside a nearby Saizeriya. An hour later, an inebriated Chizuru asks Kazuya if he is in love with her, which he is unable to answer. Once they leave, they have a conversation about their relationship and grandmothers. At their apartment complex, Kazuya musters up the courage to confess his feelings until he is interrupted by his friends. Unbeknownst to him, Chizuru is flustered about the situation. That night, Kibe informs Kazuya about how Mami is now working for his grandmother as an advisor. The next day, he runs into Mami where she tells him not to worry as she has not said anything to his grandmother. Afterward, Kazuya briefly runs into Chizuru and her friends as well.
39	3	"Daikanyama and Girlfriend"; Transliteration: "Daikanyama to Kanojo" (Japanese: 代官山と彼女(ダイカノ))	Akiko Nakano	Mitsutaka Hirota	Shinya Une	July 19, 2025
While hanging her laundry, Chizuru receives a text from Umi inviting her and Kazuya to a dinner party to celebrate the movie's success. She then informs Kazuya about it, which will take place in Daikanyama. On October 25, they arrive at the party. An hour later, Kazuya and Umi have a private conversation where the latter asks the former his interpretation of the phrase Chizuru previously used regarding if she had feelings for him. Unaware of the context, Kazuya believes that the girl in question has fallen in love. When he catches up with Chizuru, Kazuya repeats what Umi said, much to her embarrassment. Umi proceeds to have a separate private conversation with Chizuru. Once they leave, Kazuya and Chizuru talk about Mami, his grandmother, and if Chizuru is thinking about entering a real relationship. After that conversation, Kazuya becomes certain that he is in love with Chizuru and no one else.
40	4	"Decision and Girlfriend"; Transliteration: "Ketsui to Kanojo" (Japanese: 決意と彼女(キメカノ))	Marie Koizumi	Rie Uehara	Hiroshi Matsuzono	July 26, 2025
At work, Kazuya asks Ruka to break up with him, which she refuses. Later that night, he attempts to confess to Chizuru again. However, she runs inside her apartment. The next day, they have a conversation where Chizuru expresses her concern about Mami's ulterior motive. As a result, Kazuya hangs out with Kibe on campus to find out what Mami has been up to. After an awkward moment between the two, Kibe reassures Kazuya by revealing how much his grandmother truly cares for him. He also tells Kazuya that he should be honest with her. Meanwhile, Chizuru runs into Mami where the latter escorts the former to a local Mister Donut just as Sumi leaves the building.
41	5	"Promised Time and Girlfriend"; Transliteration: "Sonotoki to Kanojo" (Japanese: その時と彼女(バッカノ))	Hiroshi Kimura	Rie Uehara	Susumu Nishizawa	August 2, 2025
Mami reveals she knows everything, including Chizuru's real name and acting career. She proceeds to insult Kazuya, claiming she is on Chizuru's side. Elsewhere, Kazuya is even more determined to confess his feelings. When he runs into Chizuru, he is interrupted by Ruka's phone call. Later that afternoon, Ruka shows up at his apartment. Meanwhile, Chizuru is at the batting cage where she expresses her concern about Mami. Back in Kazuya's apartment, Ruka attempts to dissuade him from asking Chizuru out. Chizuru and Kazuya's grandmother soon arrive and the latter invites everyone to a trip to Spa Resort Hawaiians. Afterward, Ruka confronts Chizuru inside Chizuru's apartment. She then presents a torn condom wrapper, claiming she had sex with Kazuya. Once she leaves, it is revealed Ruka lied about the situation.
42	6	"Family Trip and Girlfriend"; Transliteration: "Kazoku Ryokō to Kanojo" (Japanese: 家族旅行と彼女(タビカノ))	Hidehiko Kadota	Mitsutaka Hirota	Hiroshi Matsuzono	August 9, 2025
In Kazuya's apartment, Kazuya still wants to confess to Chizuru to ensure he does not disappoint his grandmother. Meanwhile, Chizuru is conflicted over Kazuya and Ruka's relationship. The next day, Kazuya and Chizuru run into each other before the latter hurriedly leaves. Sometime later, everyone, including Kazuya's family, Kibe and Kuri, are ready to go to Spa Resort Hawaiians. Before they leave, Kazuya and Kuri have a private conversation about how they are going to handle the awkward situation they find themselves in. Kazuya then asks Ruka to behave herself. When he meets up with Chizuru, she reveals she still has his family's engagement ring in her possession. Once the group finally arrives at the resort, Mami is waiting for them in the lobby, much to Kazuya and Chizuru's shock.
43	7	"Hawaiians and Girlfriend"; Transliteration: "Hawaianzu to Kanojo" (Japanese: ハワイアンズと彼女(ハワカノ))	Akiko Nakano	Rie Uehara	Hiroshi Matsuzono	August 16, 2025
When Kazuya confronts his grandmother, she reveals that Mami told her about certain details she was previously unaware of concerning Chizuru. She then arranges it so Kazuya and Chizuru are staying in the same room. Meanwhile, Kuri learns Ruka is no longer working as a rental girlfriend. In their room, Chizuru runs to the bathroom when she realizes Kazuya is going to confess. A jealous Ruka soon shows up and invites them to the pool. After a while, Kibe and Kazuya have a conversation about why Kazuya's grandmother was so excited about coming to the resort. Once Chizuru and Ruka arrive in their bikinis, Kazuya, Kibe and Kuri cannot stop gazing at them. Just before Kazuya and Chizuru are ready to go down the water slide together, the latter notices that the strings for her top feel loose.
44	8	"Strings and Girlfriend"; Transliteration: "Himo to Kanojo" (Japanese: 紐と彼女(ポロカノ))	Marie Koizumi	Mitsutaka Hirota	Daigo Kinoshita	August 23, 2025 (Note: This episode aired at 2:28 a.m. JST, 5 minutes after the regular air time.)
An anxious Kazuya is held onto by Chizuru. Once they reach the bottom, Chizuru recalls the conversation she had with Mami about Kazuya prior to them arriving at the resort. She then realizes she has lost her top before Kazuya retrieves it for her. After he helps her, Kazuya compliments Chizuru's bikini. While they are walking around, Chizuru asks Kazuya if something happen with Ruka, much to the latter's confusion. They soon spot Mami and Kazuya's grandmother are alone together and are relieved when they discover Mami has not revealed the true nature of their relationship. Sometime later, as they are hanging out with their friends, Kazuya takes Mami aside and apologizes to her for lying about not seeing Chizuru anymore, which she seemingly accepts. When they return, Mami notices Ruka's reaction when Kibe inquires about Chizuru and Ruka's friendship.
45	9	"For My First Time and Girlfriend"; Transliteration: "Hajimete no Kinen to Kanojo" (Japanese: 初めて記念と彼女(ハツカノ))	Hiroshi Kimura	Rie Uehara	Hiroshi Matsuzono	August 30, 2025 (Note: This episode aired at 3:28 a.m. JST, 1 hour and 5 minutes after the regular air time.)
One hour ago, a distracted Ruka wondered about the situation involving Kazuya, Chizuru, Kuri, and Mami. In the present, while everyone is hanging out, Ruka tricks Kazuya into being alone with her. When they return to the water park, Ruka is approached by Mami. Following the conversation, Ruka is with Chizuru. When Chizuru returns the torn condom wrapper to Ruka, the latter is elated that the former seemingly believes her lie that she had sex with Kazuya. When he shows up, however, he vehemently denies it. He reiterates this when Chizuru asks him about it. Later on, Chizuru reminisces about something her grandmother said to her while the group is watching a Polynesian show.
46	10	"Ring Finger and Girlfriend"; Transliteration: "Kusuriyubi to Kanojo" (Japanese: 薬指と彼女(ユビカノ))	Akiko Nakano	Rie Uehara	Hiroshi Matsuzono	September 6, 2025
Chizuru, Ruka, and Kazuya's grandmother are hanging out together in the outdoor bath where the latter gives Chizuru a heartfelt speech about how she is not alone. Meanwhile, Kazuya has a conversation with his father about Chizuru and how lies can be beneficial. Ruka later wonders if she should reveal the truth to Kazuya's grandmother, but she decides against it. Instead, she sleeps in Kazuya and Chizuru's room. Once they are finally alone, Chizuru informs Kazuya she is going to give him a discount. When the latter apologizes for the inconvenience, the former thanks him for the invite. Kazuya's mother soon asks Chizuru to join her after her son leaves. They have a conversation about Kazuya's grandmother before they head near a church inside the resort. There, Kazuya's mother explains her family's history. She then tells Chizuru that she can talk to her about anything. Unbeknownst to them, they are being followed by Mami, who heard everything.
47	11	"Guilt and Girlfriend"; Transliteration: "Zaiakukan to Kanojo" (Japanese: 罪悪感と彼女(ギルカノ))	Marie Koizumi	Mitsutaka Hirota	Daigo Kinoshita	September 13, 2025
The next morning, Kazuya and Chizuru have a brief conversation before Ruka clings onto Kazuya after waking up. As everyone is eating breakfast, Kazuya is even more determined to confess to Chizuru. Mami soon calls out Chizuru regarding her behavior while they are in the bathroom. When Kazuya's grandmother shows up, Mami shockingly covers for Chizuru. Once Kazuya is finally alone with Chizuru, he notices something is off with her. She proceeds to express her concern about Mami. However, they are interrupted by Kazuya's grandmother, which causes Chizuru to head to the church. When Kazuya follows his grandmother, the latter apologizes to the former over how she has been treating him. Elsewhere, Mami decides she is going to handle the situation herself after she receives a text from Kazuya's grandmother.
48	12	"Paradise and Girlfriend"; Transliteration: "Rakuen to Kanojo" (Japanese: 楽園と彼女(ケッカノ))	Akiko Nakano	Mitsutaka Hirota	Shinya Une	September 20, 2025
Chizuru is alone thinking about the situation she and Kazuya find themselves in when she receives a text from Mami. Meanwhile, a frustrated Kazuya decides that he is going to confess to Chizuru no matter what happens. Once he finally catches up to her, he attempts to do just that. However, a frantic Chizuru suddenly runs off when she receives another text from Mami. She soon arrives in the lobby where she meets up with Mami, who again claims that she is still on Chizuru's side before she proceeds to offer a payment. Elsewhere, Kazuya is dejected about the apparent rejection.

== Home media release ==
=== Japanese ===
DMM.com (Japan – Region 2/A)
Vol.	Episodes	Release date	Cover art	Ref.
1	37–42	December 24, 2025	Chizuru Mizuhara	
2	43–48	January 28, 2026	Chizuru Mizuhara	

=== English ===
Crunchyroll, LLC (North America – Region 1/A)
Season	Discs	Episodes	Cover art	Release date	Ref.
4	2	37–48	Chizuru Mizuhara, Mami Nanami, Ruka Sarashina, Sumi Sakurasawa and Mini Yaemori	August 11, 2026	
