= Rent-A-Girlfriend season 1 =

2020 Japanese anime season

Rent-A-Girlfriend
- Season 1
- First home media volume cover for the season
- No. of episodes: 12

Release
- Original network: MBS, TBS
- Original release: July 11 – September 26, 2020

Season chronology
- Next → Season 2

Rent-A-Girlfriend is a Japanese anime television series based on the manga series of the same name by Reiji Miyajima. The first season was produced by TMS Entertainment and directed by Kazuomi Koga, with Mitsutaka Hirota handling series composition, Kanna Hirayama designing the characters, and Hyadain composing the music. The Peggies performed the opening theme song "Centimeter" (センチメートル). Halca performed the first ending theme song "Kokuhaku Bungee Jump" (告白バンジージャンプ; lit. 'Confession Bungee Jump') starting from episodes 2–6 and 8–11, (Note: "Kokuhaku Bungee Jump" is used as an insert song in episode 12.) while Halca also performed the second ending theme song "First Drop" for episode 7, (Note: "First Drop" by Halca is heard during the end credits of episode 7.) and Sora Amamiya performed the third ending theme song "Kimi wo Tousite" (君を通して; lit. 'Through You') for episode 12. It aired from July 11 to September 26, 2020, on the Super Animeism programming block on MBS and other networks. (Note: MBS and TBS listed the series premiere as airing on July 10 at 25:25, which is effectively July 11 at 1:25 a.m. JST.) The season adapts manga content from the 1st volume to the 6th volume (chapters 1–50).

== Episodes ==
No. overall	No. in season	Title (Note: The ruby text glossed over the Japanese episode titles are merely character abbreviations and have no actual significance besides shortening the pronunciation. Despite being officially promoted as part of each title card, they do not appear in the episodes.)	Directed by	Written by	Storyboarded by	Original release date
1	1	"Rent-a-Girlfriend"; Transliteration: "Rentaru Kanojo" (Japanese: レンタル彼女(レンカノ))	Fumihiro Ueno	Mitsutaka Hirota	Kazuomi Koga	July 11, 2020
Kazuya Kinoshita is a college student who is dumped by his girlfriend Mami Nanami after a month of dating. To cure his depression, he rents a girlfriend named Chizuru Mizuhara, but is dissatisfied by how inauthentic she acts. Their second date consists of him calling her out, which leads to her revealing her true colors. Kazuya is then called to the hospital due to his grandmother getting hospitalized once again, and Kazuya's family is shocked to see his new "girlfriend" with him upon visiting. When Kazuya's grandmother decides to go tell the other elder women, Chizuru panics as one of them is her own grandmother. After leaving the hospital, Kazuya is prepared to move on with his love life, but that is stopped short when he and Chizuru find out that they attend the same college.
2	2	"Ex-Girlfriend and Girlfriend"; Transliteration: "Moto Kano to Kanojo" (Japanese: 元カノと彼女(モトカノ))	Takashi Tanasawa	Mitsutaka Hirota	Motoki Nakanishi	July 18, 2020
Chizuru runs away after she and Kazuya encounter each other. Once the coast is clear, she tells him to not say anything. The next morning, they find out they live next door at their apartment complex. After Kazuya receives a call from his grandmother, he begs Chizuru to help him out, but she refuses. When Kazuya's grandmother comes over to his apartment, she is disappointed Chizuru has not shown up. When Chizuru hears this, she arrives with a cooked meal. Afterward, Chizuru agrees to be Kazuya's "girlfriend" for one hour every Wednesday. A week later, Kazuya encounters Mami again for the first time since they broke up. Kazuya then goes with Chizuru to meet his grandmother. After visiting her, they are spotted by his friends, who invite them over to a drinking party. At the party, Kazuya notices Mami is there too, and she proceeds to insult him. Chizuru angrily calls out Mami, but Kazuya stands up for Mami. Once the party is over, Kazuya is walking home alone when Mami asks him if he wants to head to her place.
3	3	"Beach and Girlfriend"; Transliteration: "Umi to Kanojo" (Japanese: 海と彼女(ナツカノ))	Taku Yamada	Mitsutaka Hirota	Naoyuki Kuzuya	July 25, 2020
When Kazuya asks Mami about her new boyfriend, she claims that she lied because he brought Chizuru with him. She then claims that her brother is at her place, so they cannot go there. However, when Mami insults Chizuru, Kazuya defends Chizuru before he runs off. When he arrives at his apartment, Kazuya apologizes to Chizuru for what happened earlier. She tells him that it is alright and if he needs her, she will be there for him. Sometime later, Kazuya and his friends head to the beach in the Izu Peninsula. While she is alone, Mami is shown to be very jealous of Kazuya and Chizuru's relationship. Later, as Mami attempts to bring up all the good times she and Kazuya had when they were dating, Chizuru shows up in her university guise. During a shopping trip, Kazuya and Chizuru get into an argument, which draws Mami's attention. Chizuru quickly changes and pretends she and Kazuya are on a date, much to Mami's surprise. Chizuru attempts to leave, but she is forced to stay, which causes Kazuya to brag to his friends about how they met. When he goes swimming, Mami kisses him.
4	4	"Friends and Girlfriend"; Transliteration: "Tomodachi to Kanojo" (Japanese: 友達と彼女(マサカノ))	Akira Yamada	Mitsutaka Hirota	Masaki Ōzora	August 1, 2020
While Mami is kissing Kazuya, he remembers when they first met. When they return to the group, Kazuya receives a call from his grandmother informing him that she will be discharged from the hospital. After taking the call, Kazuya announces he and Chizuru are going to break up, which leads to a fight between him and Yoshiaki Kibe. Kibe then calls out Mami for her behavior. Afterward, Chizuru tells Kazuya that he did nothing wrong. Later, Kibe catches up with Chizuru and they have a conversation about Kazuya. He tells her that he has known Kazuya since they were little and despite his flaws, Kazuya is a good guy at heart. He then gives her a couple of ferry tickets he bought. On the ferry, Kazuya receives a call from Mami. While he is on the phone, a delirious Chizuru falls overboard. After he hears what happened from the other passengers, Kazuya immediately goes after her.
5	5	"Hot Springs and Girlfriend"; Transliteration: "Onsen to Kanojo" (Japanese: 温泉と彼女(イマカノ))	Taku Yamada	Fumi Tsubota	Naoyuki Kuzuya	August 8, 2020
While Kazuya is able to rescue Chizuru, he ends up in bad shape after they return to the surface. A distraught Chizuru then saves his life by performing CPR. When he is discharged from the hospital, his friends give him a ride home. At their apartment complex, Kazuya tells Chizuru that he already made an arrangement for next week and he will place the payment in her post box. He also apologizes to her once more for all that has happened. Inside his apartment, Kazuya realizes that he has developed romantic feelings towards Chizuru. Sometime later, Kazuya and his family head to a hot springs resort. Once they arrive there, Kazuya learns that Chizuru's grandmother is staying at the resort as well. Kazuya and Chizuru then find out they are sharing the same room thanks to their grandmothers. After they confront their grandmothers, Chizuru decides she might as well enjoy the situation. When she leaves to take a bath, she runs into Kazuya's grandmother, who explains that it is the anniversary of her husband's death. When she returns to her room, Chizuru enjoys herself and she allows Kazuya to stay with her.
6	6	"Girlfriend and Girlfriend"; Transliteration: "Kanojo to Kanojo" (Japanese: 彼女と彼女(カノカノ))	Shinya Une	Rie Uehara	Masaki Ōzora	August 15, 2020
As they are laying down, Kazuya tells Chizuru that while he believes he is a problematic client, he wants to keep renting her. Chizuru responds that he can rent her for a little while longer. A few days later, Kazuya announces to his friends that he and Chizuru are still dating. After going out on a date, Kazuya and Chizuru run into Shun "Kuri" Kuribayashi, who claims to have a girlfriend. He then sets up a double date. While he is alone, Kazuya runs into a girl. The following Saturday at a free climbing gym, Kuri introduces his girlfriend named Ruka Sarashina, the same girl Kazuya previously ran into. Later, while they are alone, Ruka asks Chizuru if she is a rental girlfriend. When Kuri goes to the bathroom, Ruka asks Kazuya and Chizuru to kiss. Chizuru pretends to kiss Kazuya, but Ruka is not convinced. Kazuya then pretends that Chizuru has to leave to visit her grandmother. Afterward, Kazuya follows Kuri and Ruka. When Kuri drops Ruka off, Kazuya is still concerned she might reveal the truth to Kuri, so he follows her inside the station. When he does, she confronts him.
7	7	"Provisional Girlfriend and Girlfriend"; Transliteration: "Kari Kano to Kanojo" (Japanese: 仮カノと彼女(カリカノ))	Kazuomi Koga	Mitsutaka Hirota	Naoyuki Kuzuya	August 22, 2020
After the confrontation, Kazuya continues to follow Ruka. Just as she is about to trip down a flight of stairs, Kazuya grabs her in order to break her fall. When he begs Ruka to not say anything, she reveals she is a rental girlfriend as well. Kazuya later tells Chizuru this, much to her annoyance. At the campus, Ruka shows up while Kazuya is waiting for Kuri. As they are hiding, Ruka checks her phone. Once they are spotted by Kuri, Ruka reveals the truth about their relationship, much to Kuri's chagrin. When Kazuya tells Chizuru what happened, Ruka shows up. She promises she will not say anything as long as she goes out with Kazuya, revealing she likes him. A conflicted Kazuya gets Chizuru to distract Ruka so he can leave to tell Kuri the truth about the situation. When Ruka catches up with him, she becomes despondent. Chizuru then tells Kazuya to go out with Ruka. It is revealed that Ruka has a low heart rate and Kazuya is the first person to elevate it. Kazuya agrees to go out with Ruka for a trial period.
8	8	"Christmas and Girlfriend"; Transliteration: "Kurisumasu to Kanojo" (Japanese: クリスマスと彼女(クリカノ))	Hidehiko Kadota	Fumi Tsubota	Naoyuki Kuzuya	August 29, 2020
Exhausted due to Ruka's clinginess, Kazuya decides to book Chizuru for Christmas Eve, but her schedule is marked as busy. On Christmas Eve, he fortuitously sees her with an attractive guy named Umi, and stalks them while getting exponentially more upset. Later that night, Kazuya is finally spotted by Chizuru, who reveals she works as a rental girlfriend to practice acting and clears up the misconceptions he has about her and Umi. She then gives Kazuya a phone case as a Christmas present.
9	9	"Lies and Girlfriend"; Transliteration: "Uso to Kanojo" (Japanese: 嘘と彼女(ウソカノ))	Naoyuki Kuzuya	Mitsutaka Hirota	Masaki Ōzora	September 5, 2020
Kazuya is working part-time at a karaoke bar. It is then revealed what happened after Christmas Eve. While on a date with Chizuru, she point blank asked him if he had feelings for her, which he reluctantly denied. Afterward, they ran into Ruka, who left with Kazuya. Inside a love hotel, he told her the truth about the situation with Chizuru. When Ruka tried to seduce him, a flustered Kazuya went to the bathroom. Ruka looked at his phone while he was away. On New Year's Day, Kazuya and Chizuru were having an outing with his family when Ruka showed up. When his grandmother confronted him, he somehow convinced her that Ruka was a pathological liar. In a restaurant, Ruka noticed the uneasiness at the table. At a shrine, Ruka attempted to reveal to truth about Chizuru to Kazuya's grandmother while they were alone, but she could not do it. She then told Kazuya she would not give up her attempt to be his girlfriend. Afterwards, it is revealed that Ruka will be working at the same karaoke bar as Kazuya.
10	10	"Friend's Girlfriend"; Transliteration: "Tomodachi no Kanojo" (Japanese: 友達の彼女(トモカノ))	Takashi Tanasawa & Yoshitsugu Kimura	Rie Uehara	Naoyuki Kuzuya	September 12, 2020
At the karaoke bar, Ruka tells Kazuya how serious she is about wanting to be his girlfriend. Kibe then shows up and he tells Kazuya that Kuri has been acting weird, posting things like he will "never fall in love again". Ruka does not give it much thought when Kazuya confronts her about it. That night, Kazuya asks Chizuru for a favor. A few days later, an embarrassed Kuri is waiting at the station when Chizuru shows up. She reveals that she is a rental girlfriend, much to Kuri's confusion. Once the date is over, Kuri thanks her and Kazuya for cheering him up. Afterward, Kazuya reveals the truth to Kuri. When Kuri asks Chizuru if she would never fall for a client, she reminisces when Kazuya asked her to go out with Kuri in order to cheer him up, answering vaguely. On their balconies, Chizuru asks Kazuya to help her by renting a shy girl she is mentoring named Sumi Sakurasawa. She then tells him that she is there for him until he forgets about Mami.
11	11	"Truth and Girlfriend"; Transliteration: "Shinjitsu to Kanojo" (Japanese: 真実と彼女(シンカノ))	Taku Yamada	Rie Uehara	Osamu Yamasaki	September 19, 2020
Sumi introduces herself by explaining her daily routine. At the station, Kazuya meets Sumi. As they are walking, Mami spots them. Kazuya sees for himself just how shy Sumi truly is. When he questions why she is a rental girlfriend, she uses hand signals to reveal her answer. Sumi later thanks Kazuya after he stopped her from getting harassed. It is then revealed that Mami was watching them. When Kazuya returns from the bathroom, he sees that Mami is sitting at their table. While they are alone, Mami tells him that he is more of a ladies' man than she thought. Once the date is over with, Kazuya praises Sumi. At her house, a jealous Mami finds out that Sumi is a rental girlfriend. Sometime later, Kazuya is hanging out with his friends when he spots Chizuru. That night, Kazuya and Chizuru have a conversation on their balconies where she thanks him for helping Sumi. She then reveals that she landed a role in a play. The next day, Chizuru is waiting for her client when Mami shows up.
12	12	"Confession and Girlfriend"; Transliteration: "Kokuhaku to Kanojo" (Japanese: 告白と彼女(コクカノ))	Kazuomi Koga	Mitsutaka Hirota	Kazuomi Koga	September 26, 2020
Kazuya agrees to go on a date with Ruka. Later at their job, just as he is about to ask her to be his girlfriend, he spots Mami and Chizuru heading into one of the rooms. Mami attempts to pay Chizuru, but she refuses. Mami then reveals how long she has known about Chizuru's occupation. Meanwhile, Kazuya finds out that Mami knows the true nature of his and Chizuru's relationship. Once they leave, he fakes an illness so he can follow them. When he finds them, Kazuya overhears their conversation. That night, Kazuya thanks Chizuru for speaking up for him. When she apologizes to him for not getting him a girlfriend, he confesses that he wants her. When questioned, he reluctantly says that he meant as a rental girlfriend. Inside her apartment, Chizuru becomes flustered. The next morning, everyone is out doing their own thing.

== Home media release ==
=== Japanese ===
DMM.com (Japan – Region 2/A)
Vol.	Episodes	Cover art	Release date	Ref.
1	1–3	Chizuru Mizuhara	October 10, 2020	
2	4–6	Mami Nanami	November 25, 2020	
3	7–9	Ruka Sarashina	December 23, 2020	
4	10–12	Sumi Sakurasawa	January 27, 2021	

=== English ===
Sentai Filmworks (North America – Region 1/A)
Season	Discs	Episodes	Cover art	Release date	Ref.
1	2	1–12	Chizuru Mizuhara	December 14, 2021	
