= Rent-A-Girlfriend season 5 =

2026 Japanese anime season

Rent-A-Girlfriend
- Season 5
- Key visual for the fifth season
- No. of episodes: 12

Release
- Original network: MBS, TBS, CBC TV
- Original release: April 11 (Note: Episodes were released on DMM TV and Crunchyroll three days before their televised airings.) – June 27, 2026

Season chronology
- ← Previous; Season 4

Rent-A-Girlfriend is a Japanese anime television series based on the manga series of the same name by Reiji Miyajima.

A fifth season, which was originally intended to be the second cours of the previous season, aired from April 11 to June 27, 2026. (Note: MBS, TBS, and CBC listed the season premiere at 26:23 on April 10, 2026, which is effectively April 11 at 2:23 a.m. JST.) The opening theme song is "Non Scenario Etude" (ノンシナリオ・エチュード) performed by Sora Amamiya, while the ending theme song is "204-gōshitsu" (204号室; "Room 204") performed by Nakigoto. For the ending of episode 52, an acoustic version of "Boku no Vega" (ぼくのベガ; lit. 'My Vega'), performed by Regal Lily, was used.

== Episodes ==
No. overall	No. in season	Title (Note: The ruby text glossed over the Japanese episode titles are merely character abbreviations and have no actual significance besides shortening the pronunciation. Despite being officially promoted as part of each title card, they do not appear in the episodes.)	Directed by	Written by	Storyboarded by	Original release date
49	1	"Ex-Girlfriend, Nanami Mami"; Transliteration: "Moto Kano, Nanami Mami" (Japanese: 元カノ、七海麻美(マエカノ))	Akira Mano	Mitsutaka Hirota	Hiroshi Matsuzono	April 11, 2026
Mami recalls how her father controlled every aspect of her life growing up. In high school, she met a boy named Taro Urashima, who became her boyfriend. She was genuinely happy until she discovered her father placed her in an arranged marriage. When Mami objected, her father forced Taro to break up with her. As a result, she believes that she was simply being rebellious and anytime she sees a couple, she has the urge to break them up. In the present, Chizuru declines Mami's payment. Instead, she agrees to tell Kazuya's grandmother the truth. After prying about Chizuru's grandmother and the engagement ring, Mami proceeds to insult Kazuya once more. This causes Chizuru to change her mind and she begs Mami to not say anything. Elsewhere, Ruka and Kuri have an awkward conversation where the latter admits to being happy to see the former again.
50	2	"Rental Girlfriend"; Transliteration: "Rentaru no Kanojo" (Japanese: レンタルの彼女(カリカノ))	Hiroshi Kimura	Mitsutaka Hirota	Hiroshi Kimura & Aleksei Iatsutko	April 18, 2026
Kazuya receives a call from Ruka reminding him that he was supposed to meet her. Seemingly accepting Chizuru's apparent rejection, he arrives at the pool. While hanging out with Ruka, Kibe and Kuri, Kazuya has intrusive thoughts about Chizuru. Afterward, Chizuru joins the group. Once Kibe and Kuri leave, Kazuya and Chizuru have an awkward conversation concerning how they will handle their situation following the trip. Chizuru then recalls Mami's reaction when she begged the latter to not say anything. Later that day, Mami subtlety drops her phone with Chizuru's rental girlfriend profile on it in front of everyone.
51	3	"The End of the Girlfriend"; Transliteration: "Owari no Kanojo" (Japanese: 終わりの彼女(オワカノ))	Akiko Nakano	Rie Uehara	Hiroshi Matsuzono	April 25, 2026
Kazuya's grandmother discovers that Chizuru's profile is indeed real. Kazuya is nearly able to brush it off until his father recalls previously seeing him hand Chizuru some money outside their apartment complex. Mami proceeds to make the situation worse when she pretends she can no longer cover up the truth. She then goes one step further by making it seem like Chizuru has been using Kazuya the whole time. In a flashback, Kazuya and Chizuru's grandmothers had a conversation about how happy they were over their grandchildren's relationship. Back in the present, Kibe punches Kazuya. Afterward, he reveals the actual reason why Kazuya's grandmother organized the trip to the resort. A distraught Chizuru is unable to say anything when she is asked to speak in her defense, which causes Kazuya to stand up for her.
52	4	"Climax and Girlfriend"; Transliteration: "Kuraimakkusu to Kanojo" (Japanese: クライマックスと彼女(クラカノ))	Akiko Nakano	Mitsutaka Hirota	Kazuomi Koga	May 2, 2026
In a flashback, Kazuya promised Chizuru that he would protect her if his grandmother ever learned that she lied to her grandmother about their relationship. Back in the present, Kazuya claims that he and Chizuru started dating for real a week before her grandmother died. A skeptical Mami tells them to prove it by kissing. When Ruka and Kuri try to cover for them, Kibe mentions that he no longer wants to be tricked as he has always valued his friendship with Kazuya. After a while, Chizuru walks up to Kazuya and kisses him.
53	5	"Legitimate Girlfriend"; Transliteration: "Shōshinshōmei no Kanojo" (Japanese: 正真正銘の彼女(ガチカノ))	Marie Koizumi	Rie Uehara	Daigo Kinoshita	May 9, 2026
After kissing Kazuya, Chizuru confesses that she is indeed a rental girlfriend and she apologizes to everyone. She then states that she is legitimately Kazuya's girlfriend now. When Mami expresses skepticism for a second time, Chizuru gives Kazuya another kiss. A couple of hours later, Kazuya and Chizuru come clean to Kazuya's grandmother about almost all the details of their relationship. During dinner, Chizuru heads to the restroom. While she is away, Kazuya and Kuri have a conversation about what transpired. Elsewhere, Chizuru is confronted by an enraged Mami. Chizuru proceeds to tell Mami that she needs to stop lying to herself. Once she is alone, it revealed that despite how she come across when she is with Kazuya, Chizuru is very conflicted about her own feelings for him.
54	6	"Long Time No Girlfriend"; Transliteration: "Hisashiburi no Kanojo" (Japanese: 久しぶりの彼女(ヒサカノ))	Akiko Nakano	Mitsutaka Hirota	Hiroshi Matsuzono	May 16, 2026
Two days later, Kazuya is back in his apartment thinking about the kiss. He attempts to speak to Chizuru, but she ghosts him. After three months, Kazuya is depressed. When Mini returns from her vacation in India to visit him, she learns what happened. Kazuya proceeds to dismiss her claim that Chizuru does not hate him at all. That night, Mini runs into Chizuru. Inside Chizuru's apartment, Chizuru explains why she is ghosting Kazuya. Mini tells her that this was the wrong thing to do and she should get back in contact with Kazuya.
55	7	"Valentine's and Girlfriend"; Transliteration: "Barentain to Kanojo" (Japanese: バレンタインと彼女(バレカノ))	Hiroshi Kimura	Rie Uehara	Hiroshi Matsuzono	May 23, 2026
Kazuya is still depressed inside his apartment when Mini shows up. She proceeds to explain to him what Chizuru told her. Later that night, Kazuya is relieved when Chizuru contacts him for the first time since she ghosted him. On March 1, Kazuya and Chizuru meet each other in Harajuku. After a while, Chizuru gives Kazuya a box of chocolates. She then apologizes for ghosting him. In turn, Kazuya is finally able to ask Chizuru if there is more to the situation than she is letting on. Just as he is about to leave, Chizuru stops him and admits that her feelings for him are conflicted. She also admits that due to her job, he might not be in love with the real her. As a result, Chizuru tells Kazuya to give her a little more time.
56	8	"Investigation and Girlfriend"; Transliteration: "Chōsa to Kanojo" (Japanese: 調査と彼女(ウサカノ))	Marie Koizumi & Ryōko Takemura	Mitsutaka Hirota	Daigo Kinoshita	May 30, 2026
Kazuya thinks about what Chizuru said. He then informs Mini what happened. Meanwhile, Chizuru is also thinking about the same thing as Kazuya. That night, Chizuru arrives inside Kazuya's apartment where she asks how things are going between him and Ruka. Once she hears his response, Chizuru states that she does not want to hurt Ruka any more than she already has. As a result, she promises to come up with a solution in regards to their situation. Afterward, they watch one of Mini's videos. Just before Chizuru heads inside her apartment, Kazuya tells her that he will wait for her no matter how long it takes.
57	9	"Bra and Girlfriend"; Transliteration: "Bura to Kanojo" (Japanese: ブラと彼女(ブラカノ))	Akira Mano	Rie Uehara	Hiroshi Matsuzono	June 6, 2026
At the laundromat, Kazuya briefly runs into Chizuru before he notices a bra is still in the washing machine. He then starts panicking when she returns until the latter gives him tickets to her upcoming play. Afterward, Kazuya discovers the bra actually belongs to an older female acquaintance. Sometime later, Ruka expresses her joy over Kazuya breaking out of his depression while both are at work. Kazuya and Chizuru proceed to text each other throughout the day. On April 7, Kazuya is on campus talking about Chizuru with his friends. Once they are alone, Kazuya apologizes to Kibe for lying to him. Meanwhile, Mami is nearby thinking about what Chizuru said. Outside their apartment complex, Chizuru asks Kazuya to come over to her grandmother's house.
58	10	"Childhood Home and Girlfriend"; Transliteration: "Sodatta Ie to Kanojo" (Japanese: 育った家と彼女(イクカノ))	Hiroshi Kimura	Mitsutaka Hirota	Hiroshi Kimura	June 13, 2026
Chizuru explains that she needs Kazuya's help getting her grandmother's house in order. Once they arrive there, Kazuya notices several things before they start cleaning up the house. Chizuru is reminded of her grandfather while she watches Kazuya. Kazuya soon comes across an altar for both Chizuru's grandfather and mother. As they are taking a break, Kazuya reassures Chizuru that is okay to keep pictures of her mother regardless if she does not remember her. Just then, an earthquake occurs, which causes Kazuya to fall on top of Chizuru. Following the awkward moment between the two, Kazuya leaves the room. Once they are finally done, Kazuya and Chizuru have a conversation about their ideal married life. When they head back to their apartment complex, Mini informs them that due to the damage caused by the earthquake, everyone has to move. Afterward, the trio go their separate ways.
59	11	"Moving and Girlfriend"; Transliteration: "Hikkoshi to Kanojo" (Japanese: 引っ越しと彼女(コシカノ))	Akiko Nakano	Rie Uehara	Daigo Kinoshita	June 20, 2026
Kazuya is at his family's house thinking about both Chizuru and finding a new place to live. Meanwhile, Chizuru returns to her grandmother's house. That night, Kazuya meets up with Mini before they head to an izakaya. There, Mini sends a picture of Kazuya to Chizuru via their group chat. Much to their surprise, Chizuru asks if she can join them. After a while, Chizuru arrives at the izakaya. While drinking together, Kazuya asks Chizuru how she truly feels about their current situation. Her response catches him off guard. Elsewhere, Sumi enjoys a bottle of umeshu Chizuru gave her on her birthday.
60	12	"Loneliness and Girlfriend"; Transliteration: "Sabishisa to Kanojo" (Japanese: 寂しさと彼女(サビカノ))	Akiko Nakano	Mitsutaka Hirota	Hiroshi Matsuzono	June 27, 2026
Chizuru downplays Mini's suggestions that she and Kazuya should live together and share another kiss. Once the trio leaves the izakaya, Kazuya is too inebriated to move. While Mini is looking for a taxi, Chizuru squats next to Kazuya. Just as she is about to kiss him, he blurts out that he loves her. Mini soon returns to retrieve them. The next night, Kazuya is informed by Chizuru that they along with Mini will be living together as roommates for a month.

== Home media release ==
=== Japanese ===
DMM.com (Japan – Region 2/A)
Vol.	Episodes	Cover art	Release date	Ref.
1	49–54	Chizuru Mizuhara (Note: Mami Nanami and Ruka Sarashina will be featured separately in alternate cover art for the first volume, while Sumi Sakurasawa and Mini Yaemori will be featured separately in alternate cover art for the second volume.)	November 25, 2026	
2	55–60	Chizuru Mizuhara	January 27, 2027	
