= Keishi =

- Gender: Male

Origin
- Origin: Japanese
- Meaning: Different meanings depending on the kanji used

Keishi (written: 啓志, 啓示, 啓視 or 圭志) is a masculine Japanese given name. Notable people with the name include:

- Keishi Edogawa (江戸川 啓視), a pen name of author Takashi Nagasaki
- Hamanoshima Keishi (濱ノ嶋 啓志; born 1970), Japanese sumo wrestler
- Keishi Handa (半田 圭史; born 1977), Japanese former basketball player
- Keishi Ishikawa (石川 京侍朗; born 1994), Japanese racing driver
- Keishi Kameyama (亀山 敬司; born 1960/61), Japanese billionaire businessman
- Keishi Kusumi (楠美 圭史; born 1994), Japanese footballer
- Keishi Otani (大谷 圭志; born 1983), Japanese footballer
- Keishi Ōtomo (大友 啓史; born 1966), Japanese film director and screenwriter
- Keishi Suzuki (鈴木 啓示; born 1947), Japanese baseball player
