= Kameyama =

Kameyama may refer to:

- Emperor Kameyama (1249–1305), emperor of Japan 1259–1274
- Kameyama, Mie, a city in Mie prefecture, Japan

== People with the surname ==
- Cíntia Kameyama (1965–), a Brazilian botanist, known by the botanical author abbreviation Kameyama
- Keishi Kameyama, Japanese businessman
- Sukekiyo Kameyama (亀山 助清, 1954–2013), Japanese voice actor
- Kameyama Yoshiharu (龜山 嘉治, d. 1865), Japanese nativist scholar
