= Stationflow =

2020 video game developed by DMM Games

- cover art of the game
- Developer: DMM Games
- Publisher: DMM Games
- Director: Szabó Marcell
- Producer: Tak Fujii
- Designer: Szabó Marcell
- Programmer: Katsuura Kirill
- Artist: Matthew Hope
- Platform: Microsoft Windows macOS
- Release: WW: 15 April 2020
- Genres: Casual, Simulation
- Mode: Single-player

Stationflow (stylised as STATIONflow) is a casual-simulation video game developed and published by DMM Games. It was released for Microsoft Windows on 15 April 2020.

== Gameplay ==
Unlike Mini Metro, which focus on the design of metro lines, Stationflow is a video game that simulates the flow of metro passengers, which requires players to build a metro station. Players have to provide the facilities, signage, and connections between entry points and train tracks in a station map up to nine floors.

== Development and release ==
Stationflow was developed and published by Japanese video game developer DMM Games. It was available worldwide on 15 April 2020 on Microsoft Windows.

== Reception ==
Reception

Aggregate score
Aggregator	Score
Metacritic	74/100

Stationflow received "mixed or average" reviews, according to review aggregator Metacritic.

Jamie Latour of The Gamer rated the game 4 stars out of five. He praised the game is "addictive", but not pleased with the finicky UI.

Daniel Weissenberger said the concept of the game along with its simplicity led to success, but also mentioned that "the [construction] system doesn't allow for overlapping shapes, demanding the player be exact and precise with each new area to be excavated."
