= AKB49: Ren'ai Kinshi Jōrei =

Japanese manga series

- Cover of the first tankōbon volume as published by Kodansha

AKB49〜恋愛禁止条例〜
- Manga
- Written by: Motoazabu Factory
- Illustrated by: Reiji Miyajima
- Published by: Kodansha
- Magazine: Weekly Shōnen Magazine
- Original run: August 25, 2010 – January 20, 2016
- Volumes: 29

AKB49: Ren'ai Kinshi Jōrei (AKB49〜恋愛禁止条例〜; lit. 'AKB49: Ordinance Against Love') (Note: The subtitle refers to rules forbidding talent from getting into romantic relationships.) is a Japanese manga series based on the female idol group AKB48. The manga is illustrated by Reiji Miyajima and based on the original work by Motoazabu Factory. It is told through the eyes of the 12th generation kenkyūsei member Minoru Urayama. Real AKB48 members also appear occasionally in the story as supporting characters.

AKB49: Renai Kinshi Jourei was serialized in Kodansha's Weekly Shōnen Magazine from August 2010 to January 2016. It was collected into twenty-nine tankōbon volumes. In 2014, the first five volumes were adapted into a stage play that ran for a week in September 2014. Various members of the 48 group family made up the cast.

== Plot ==
The story follows Minoru Urayama, a high school boy who has no dreams. Minoru's crush, Hiroko Yoshinaga, dreams of becoming a member of the idol group AKB48. In order to help her with her auditions, Minoru secretly enters with her, cross-dressed as a girl named Minori Urakawa. His plan works and Hiroko is picked, but much to his dismay so is his girl alias, Minori! The story then follows Minori (Minoru) and Hiroko as they overcome the numerous trials of the idol world while Minoru tries to keep his secret from getting exposed and get Hiroko to the very top.

== Characters ==
Minoru Urayama (浦山 実, Urayama Minoru) / Minori Urakawa (浦川 みのり, Urakawa Minori)
The main male character in the story and a 12th generation Kenkyūsei member of the female idol group AKB48. He is also known by his female name "Minori Urakawa" in this story. 167 cm tall, Minoru has a younger sister.
Initially, Minoru had no interest in AKB48, and because of this, was laughed at by his classmates who were big fans of the group. However, wanting to help Hiroko, his classmate whom he had a secret crush on, Minoru cross-dressed and participated in an audition together with her. Unwittingly, after he helped Hiroko pass her audition, he was selected by AKB48's producer Yasushi Akimoto to become a member of the group. Almost nobody suspected that he was a male, because he had a face that looked "pretty". He was often mistaken for another AKB48 member Sae Miyazawa by Yuko Oshima. Mayu Watanabe is the only member who suspected him as a boy, but she was convinced by his explanation that he looked like one because he worked in a butler café.
Unbeknownst to everyone, including Minoru, Producer Akimoto also knew that Minoru/Minori was a male, but because he felt that Minoru made up for the traits that other girls were lacking, Minoru was allowed to remain in the group. In Chapter 93 of the manga, Atsuko Maeda also knew that he was a male, but tells Minori/Minoru that she'll never reveal the secret. Minoru unveiled himself and his "Minoru" persona to Aki-P at the ending of Chapter 204, however the rest of the meeting remained unknown. On Chapter 253, Hiroko somehow found out about his/her identity, due to a massive search. He unveiled their identity in front of all members of AKB48, Togasaki, and whole stage crew on Chapter 256.
They used to be a member of a newly-created stand-alone unit "Gekoku Jou" with Hiroko Yoshinaga and Ai Okabe. Currently a full-time member of Team A and co-current member of SKE, NMB, and HKT as national member alongside Hiroko.
Hiroko Yoshinaga (吉永 寛子, Yoshinaga Hiroko)
A 12th generation Kenkyūsei member of AKB48. She is a big fan of the idol group, especially one of the lead member Atsuko Maeda. She would get very angry with anyone who criticized Maeda. She passed the 12th generation Kenkyūsei audition because she spoke out in defense of Maeda when Minoru criticized Maeda when he was asked the question "which is your favorite AKB48 member?".
As a person who dislikes sports, Hiroko is frequently tired out by the dance trainings that all kenkyūseimembers have to go through, to the extent that she is injury-prone. However, Hiroko is also hard-working, and she frequently stayed back after the practice sessions to continue dancing with Minoru. As the series progressed, her hard work paid off with her dancing abilities improving very much.
She to be a member of the standalone unit "Gekoku Jou" with Minoru Urayama and Ai Okabe. She is also a full-time member of Team K and co-current member of SKE, NMB, and HKT as national member alongside Minori.
During Senbatsu Election in Chapter 212, following an agreement between Minoru Urayama and Yasushi Akimoto, Yoshinaga was elected to number 8 and became the center in next single after Senbatsu Election single.
Ai Okabe (岡部 愛, Okabe Ai)
An 11th generation kenkyūsei member of AKB48. Despite being talented in dancing and singing, she is also ambitious and self-centered, which caused her to view "Minori" with enmity after he replaced her as center in enkyūsei performances, and even tried to sabotage him inside and outside performances. As the series progressed, while remaining aloof from the other kenkyūsei members, she was forced to admit that Minoru made a better center than her due to his charisma and hard-working attitude.
She used to be a member of the standalone unit "Gekoku Jou" with Minoru Urayama and Hiroko Yoshinaga. She is former a member of Team B. Announced Graduation on Chapter 202.
Haruko Mizuno (水野 春子, Mizuno Haruko)
A 12th generation kenkyūsei member of AKB48.Hailing from Fukuoka, she stays in a dormitory designated for AKB48 kenkyūsei members and became roommates with Hiroko after the latter was rendered homeless after a confrontation with her father. Revealed to be a former boss of a ladies biker gang back in Fukuoka.
Taichi Kijima (喜嶋 太一, Kijima Taichi)
The tall manager of the standalone unit "Gekoku Jou". He acts clumsy and accident-prone, but dedicated to his work and sincerely believed in fostering the unit to its utmost. He is also described as "someone who completely understands the pains and regrets of an idol".
Tadamoto Kisaki (妃 忠祖, Kisaki Tadamoto)
A mysterious old man who seems to be a janitor, he is later revealed to be the director of Queen Records, the company that manages "Gekoku Jou".

=== Real life characters ===
Minami Takahashi (高橋 みなみ, Takahashi Minami)
AKB48 team A's captain.
Haruna Kojima (小嶋 陽菜, Kojima Haruna)
AKB48 team A member.
Mariko Shinoda (篠田 麻里子, Shinoda Mariko)
AKB48 team A member.
Atsuko Maeda (前田 敦子, Maeda Atsuko)
AKB48 team A member. In the series, she is portrayed as another hard-working member who is credited with making the group famous. However, after she was not enthusiastic in some concerts, people started to criticize her as "lazy", and her popularity starts to drop. She is Hiroko Yoshinaga's idol in the group, which led her to become kenkyūsei member.
Rino Sashihara (指原 莉乃, Sashihara Rino)
AKB48 team A member.
Rie Kitahara (北原 里英, Kitahara Rie)
AKB48 team B member.
Sayaka Akimoto (秋元 才加, Akimoto Sayaka)
AKB48 team K's captain.
Minami Minegishi (峯岸 みなみ, Minegishi Minami)
AKB48 team K member.
Tomomi Itano (板野 友美, Itano Tomomi)
AKB48 team K member.
Sae Miyazawa (宮澤 佐江, Miyazawa Sae)
AKB48 team K member, she was cast to play the role of Minoru in the 2014 stage adaptation.
Yuko Oshima (大島 優子, Ōshima Yūko)
AKB48 team K member, she was first introduced in this manga when Minoru Urayama accidentally stumbled into the AKB48 dressing room and surprised her. In an interview, Yūko said that "when she read the manga, she felt like she was in that dressing room as illustrated by the author."
Yuki Kashiwagi (柏木 由紀, Kashiwagi Yuki)
The leader of AKB48 team B.
Mayu Watanabe (渡辺 麻友, Watanabe Mayu)
AKB48 team B member.
Yasushi Akimoto (秋元 康, Akimoto Yasushi)
The producer of AKB48, is also featured in this manga as the producer of this group.
Tomonobu Togasaki (戸賀崎 智信, Togasaki Tomonobu)
The manager of the AKB48 Theater.

== Media ==
=== Manga ===
AKB49: Renai Kinshi Jourei was first announced by AKB48 producer Yasushi Akimoto on August 5, 2010. It was serialized in Kodansha's Weekly Shōnen Magazine from August 25 of the same year to January 5, 2016. Kodansha released 29 tankōbon volumes from December 17, 2010, to March 17, 2016.

AKB49: Renai Kinshi Jourei is the first manga to be based on the group AKB48, but some of its members have been featured in the manga Den no Uyugi Club and Ugirino.

==== Volume list ====
| No. | Japanese release date | Japanese ISBN |
|---|---|---|
| 1 | December 17, 2010 | 978-4-06-384425-2 |
| 2 | March 17, 2011 | 978-4-06-384465-8 |
| 3 | June 17, 2011 | 978-4-06-384511-2 |
| 4 | 16 September 2011 | 978-4-06-384554-9 |
| 5 | November 17, 2011 | 978-4-06-384586-0 |
| 6 | January 17, 2012 | 978-4-06-384618-8 |
| 7 | March 16, 2012 | 978-4-06-384648-5 |
| 8 | May 17, 2012 | 978-4-06-384676-8 |
| 9 | July 17, 2012 | 978-4-06-384709-3 |
| 10 | 14 September 2012 | 978-4-06-384740-6 |
| 11 | November 16, 2012 | 978-4-06-384769-7 |
| 12 | February 15, 2013 | 978-4-06-384816-8 |
| 13 | April 17, 2013 | 978-4-06-384849-6 |
| 14 | 17 June 2013 | 978-4-06-384881-6 |
| 15 | August 16, 2013 | 978-4-06-394914-8 |
| 16 | October 17, 2013 | 978-4-06-394945-2 |
| 17 | December 17, 2013 | 978-4-06-394985-8 |
| 18 | February 17, 2014 | 978-4-06-395010-6 |
| 19 | April 17, 2014 | 978-4-06-395053-3 |
| 20 | June 17, 2014 | 978-4-06-395106-6 |
| 21 | September 17, 2014 | 978-4-06-395189-9 |
| 22 | November 17, 2014 | 978-4-06-395245-2 |
| 23 | February 17, 2015 | 978-4-06-395291-9 |
| 24 | April 17, 2015 | 978-4-06-395373-2 |
| 25 | June 17, 2015 | 978-4-06-395417-3 |
| 26 | September 17, 2015 | 978-4-06-395487-6 |
| 27 | November 17, 2015 | 978-4-06-395537-8 |
| 28 | January 15 2016 | 978-4-06-395582-8 |
| 29 | March 17, 2016 | 978-4-06-395624-5 |

=== Stage play ===
The first five volumes of the manga were adapted for a stage play, directed by Isamu Kayano. The play was performed from September 11 to September 16, 2014, in Shibuya AiiA Theater in Tokyo. Various members of AKB48 and its sister groups were cast for the musical, with Sae Miyazawa taking the male lead role of Minoru. Other main cast roles are played by Akari Suda (Ai Okabe), Mako Kojima, and Nana Owada (sharing the role of Hiroko). On January 10, 2015, it was announced that a second edition of the musical would be performed by March in Nagoya, this time focusing on a cast of actors chosen exclusively from sister group SKE48. The main cast roles would be played by Nao Furuhata (as Minoru Urayama), Akane Takayanagi (as Ai Otabe), Ryoha Kitagawa and Ami Miyamae (double cast as Hiroko Yoshinaga).
