= Keishi Kameyama =

Japanese businessman

- Born: 1960 or 1961 (age 64–65)
- Occupation: Businessman
- Title: Founder and Chairman, DMM.com
- Spouse: Married
- Children: 2

Keishi Kameyama (亀山 敬司, Kameyama Keishi; born 1960/61) is a Japanese billionaire businessman, chairman of the internet company DMM.com, who made his initial fortune in pornography.

In 1999, Kameyama founded DMM.com, and is its chairman.

DMM started in pornography and "adult entertainment", and has "grown into a vast collection of enterprises".

In August 2017, Kameyama had an estimated net worth of US$3.5 billion.

Kameyama is married, with two children.
