= List of Rent-A-Girlfriend chapters =

Written and illustrated by Reiji Miyajima, the manga series Rent-A-Girlfriend began serialization in Kodansha's Weekly Shōnen Magazine on July 12, 2017, and has been compiled into forty-eight volumes as of November 2026. The series is licensed in North America by Kodansha USA, which released the first volume in English on June 2, 2020. Kodansha published an anthology of the series on August 17, 2020.

A spin-off manga series, titled Rent-A-(Really Shy!)-Girlfriend (彼女、人見知ります, Kanojo, Hitomishirimasu), also written and illustrated by Miyajima, has been serialized in Kodansha's Magazine Pocket app since June 21, 2020. The series focuses on the character Sumi Sakurasawa. It has been compiled into three volumes as of May 2022. Individual chapters of the series are called ratings.

== Volumes ==
=== Rent-A-Girlfriend ===
No.	Original release date	Original ISBN	English release date	English ISBN
1	October 17, 2017	978-4-06-510221-3	June 2, 2020	978-1-63-236997-0 (print); 978-1-64-659565-5 (digital)
Covers chapters in Weekly Shōnen Magazine from 2017 issue 32 to 36/37: 1. "My 'Girlfriend,' Chizuru Mizuhara" (「彼女」，水原千鶴, Kanojo, Mizuhara Chizuru); 2. "My Girlfriend" (俺の彼女, Ore no Kanojo); 3. "The Girl Next Door" (隣の彼女, Tonari no Kanojo); 4. "My Ex, Mami Nanami" (「元カノ」，七海麻美, 'Moto Kano', Nanami Mami); 5. "My Girlfriend and My Ex" (元カノと彼女, Moto Kano to Kanojo)
After having been dumped by his girlfriend, college student Kazuya Kinoshita uses an online app to hire a girl for a date, and meets the beautiful and stylish Chizuru Mizuhara. However, after reading the comments from previous customers that she acts nice to all her clients, he gets upset and starts criticizing her behavior on their next date. Chizuru pulls him aside and criticizes him back for giving her a low rating and for embarrassing her in public. While they are arguing, he gets news that his grandmother Nagomi had collapsed; he leaves immediately and Chizuru is forced to follow him to the hospital too. Although it turns out to be nothing serious, his grandmother is elated to see that he finally has a girlfriend. They agree to part ways afterwards, but discovers that they attend the same college, where Chizuru dresses up like a nerd to avoid attention. Kazuya rents Chizuru again for another hospital visit, but they discover Chizuru's grandmother has also been staying there. At home, they discovers that they are next door neighbors, and have to deal with Nagomi visiting. Kazuya requests Chizuru to let him rent her once a week to keep up appearances with his family, but on one of their dates, they bump into Kazuya's friends, who invites them to a drinking party that includes his ex, Mami Nanami. At the party, Mami talks about Kazuya's flaws until Chizuru tells her to stop it.
2	December 15, 2017	978-4-06-510580-1	August 25, 2020	978-1-63-236998-7 (print); 978-1-64-659406-1 (digital)
Covers chapters in Weekly Shōnen Magazine from 2017 issue 38 to 46: 6. "My Girlfriend and Broken Hearts" (失恋と彼女, Shitsuren to Kanojo); 7. "My Girlfriend and the Sea (1)" (海と彼女 ①, Umi to Kanojo 1); 8. "My Girlfriend and the Sea (2)" (海と彼女 ②, Umi to Kanojo 2); 9. "My Girlfriend and the Sea (3)" (海と彼女 ③, Umi to Kanojo 3); 10. "My Girlfriend and the Sea (4)" (海と彼女 ④, Umi to Kanojo 4); 11. "My Girlfriend and the Pocky Game" (ポッキーげームと彼女, Pokkīgēmu to Kanojo); 12. "My Girlfriend and a Street-Punk Fight" (彼女とガキのケンカ, Kanojo to Gaki no Kenka); 13. "My Friend and My Girlfriend" (友達と彼女, Tomodachi to Kanojo); 14. "My Girlfriend and the Sea (5)" (海と彼女 ⑤, Umi to Kanojo 5)
3	February 16, 2018	978-4-06-510970-0	October 20, 2020	978-1-64-651063-4 (print); 978-1-64-659838-0 (digital)
Covers chapters in Weekly Shōnen Magazine from 2017 issue 46 to 2018 issue 2/3: 15. "My Girlfriend and the Sea (6)" (海と彼女 ⑥, Umi to Kanojo 6); 16. "My Girlfriend and the Impulse" (衝動と彼女, Shōdō to Kanojo); 17. "My Girlfriend and the Hot Spring (1)" (温泉と彼女 ①, Onsen to Kanojo 1); 18. "My Girlfriend and the Hot Spring (2)" (温泉と彼女 ②, Onsen to Kanojo 2); 19. "My Girlfriend and the Hot Spring (3)" (温泉と彼女 ③, Onsen to Kanojo 3); 20. "My Girlfriend and His Girlfriend (1)" (彼女と彼女 ①, Kanojo to Kanojo 1); 21. My Girlfriend and His Girlfriend (2)" (彼女と彼女 ②, Kanojo to Kanojo 2); 22. My Girlfriend and His Girlfriend (3)" (彼女と彼女 ③, Kanojo to Kanojo 3); 23. My Girlfriend and His Girlfriend (4)" (彼女と彼女 ④, Kanojo to Kanojo 4)
4	April 17, 2018	978-4-06-511207-6	December 8, 2020	978-1-64-651064-1 (print); 978-1-64-659890-8 (digital)
Covers chapters in Weekly Shōnen Magazine from 2018 issue 4/5 to 13: 24. "My Girlfriend and His Girlfriend (5)" (彼女と彼女 ⑤, Kanojo to Kanojo 5); 25. "My Girlfriend and His Girlfriend (6)" (彼女と彼女 ⑥, Kanojo to Kanojo 6); 26. "My Girlfriend and His Girlfriend (7)" (彼女と彼女 ⑦, Kanojo to Kanojo 7); 27. "My Girlfriend and His Girlfriend (8)" (彼女と彼女 ⑧, Kanojo to Kanojo 8); 28. "'My Girlfriend,' Ruka Sarashina" (「彼女」、更科るか, 'Kanojo', Sarashina Ruka); 29. "Christmas and My Girlfriend (1)" (クリスマスと彼女 ①, Kurisumasu to Kanojo 1); 30. "Christmas and My Girlfriend (2)" (クリスマスと彼女 ②, Kurisumasu to Kanojo 2); 31. "Christmas and My Girlfriend (3)" (クリスマスと彼女 ③, Kurisumasu to Kanojo 3); 32. "My Two Girlfriends (1)" (２人の彼女 ①, Futari no Kanojo 1)
5	June 15, 2018	978-4-06-511621-0	March 9, 2021	978-1-64-651089-4 (print); 978-1-63-699068-2 (digital)
Covers chapters in Weekly Shōnen Magazine from 2018 issues 14 to 23: 33. "My Two Girlfriends (2)" (２人の彼女 ②, Futari no Kanojo 2); 34. "My Two Girlfriends (3)" (２人の彼女 ③, Futari no Kanojo 3); 35. "My Two Girlfriends (4)" (２人の彼女 ④, Futari no Kanojo 4); 36. "My Two Girlfriends (5)" (２人の彼女 ⑤, Futari no Kanojo 5); 37. "My Girlfriend and the Chicken (1)" (臆病者と彼女 ①, Okubyōmono to Kanojo 1); 38. "My Girlfriend and the Chicken (2)" (臆病者と彼女 ②, Okubyōmono to Kanojo 2); 39. "My Girlfriend and the Chicken (3)" (臆病者と彼女 ③, Okubyōmono to Kanojo 3); 40. "My Girlfriend and the Pair of Panties" (彼女とパンツ, Kanojo to Pantsu); 41. "My Girlfriend and the Promise on the Balcony" (彼女とベランダの約束, Kanojo to Beranda no Yakusoku)
6	September 14, 2018	978-4-06-512239-6	June 1, 2021	978-1-64-651090-0 (print); 978-1-63-699112-2 (digital)
Covers chapters in Weekly Shōnen Magazine from 2018 issues 24 to 31: 42. "My Unqualified Girlfriend (1)" (不適合の彼女 ①, Futekigō no Kanojo 1); 43. "My Unqualified Girlfriend (2)" (不適合の彼女 ②, Futekigō no Kanojo 2); 44. "My Girlfriend and the Promise on the Balcony (2)" (彼女とベランダの約束 ②, Kanojo to Beranda no Yakusoku 2); 45. "My Girlfriend and the Break-Off Point (1)" (彼女と引き際 ①, Kanojo to Hikigiwa 1); 46. "My Girlfriend and the Break-Off Point (2)" (彼女と引き際 ②, Kanojo to Hikigiwa 2); 47. "My Girlfriend and My Ex (2)" (元カノと彼女 ②, Moto Kano to Kanojo 2); 48. "My Girlfriend and My Ex (3)" (元カノと彼女 ③, Moto Kano to Kanojo 3); 49. "The Confession and My Girlfriend" (告白と彼女, Kokuhaku to Kanojo); Bonus: "Rent-A-Girlfriend × Senryu Girl" (番外編 彼女､お借りします×川柳少女, Bangai-hen Kanojo, Okarishimasu × Senryū Shōjo)
7	November 16, 2018	978-4-06-512994-4	July 20, 2021	978-1-64-651091-7 (print); 978-1-63-699330-0 (digital)
Covers chapters in Weekly Shōnen Magazine from 2018 issues 32 to 41: 50. "My Dreams and My Girlfriend 1" (夢と彼女 ①, Yume to Kanojo 1); 51. "My Dreams and My Girlfriend 2" (夢と彼女 ②, Yume to Kanojo 2); 52. "My Dreams and My Girlfriend 3" (夢と彼女 ③, Yume to Kanojo 3); 53. "My Dreams and My Girlfriend 4" (夢と彼女 ④, Yume to Kanojo 4); 54. "Side Story: Sumi Sakurasawa's Observation Diary" (番外編 桜沢墨かんさつにっき, Bangai-hen Sakurazawa Sumi Boku Kansatsu Nikki); 55. "My Girlfriend and My Father" (彼女と父親, Kanojo to Chichioya); 56. "My 'Girlfriend,' Chizuru Ichinose 1" (「彼女」，一ノ瀬ちづる ①, 'Kanojo', Ichinose Chizuru 1); 57. "My 'Girlfriend,' Chizuru Ichinose 2" (「彼女」，一ノ瀬ちづる ②, 'Kanojo', Ichinose Chizuru 2); 58. "My 'Girlfriend,' Chizuru Ichinose 3" (「彼女」，一ノ瀬ちづる ③, 'Kanojo', Ichinose Chizuru 3)
8	January 17, 2019	978-4-06-513937-0	September 21, 2021	978-1-64-651092-4 (print); 978-1-63-699383-6 (digital)
Covers chapters in Weekly Shōnen Magazine from 2018 issues 42 to 50: 59. "My 'Girlfriend,' Chizuru Ichinose 4" (「彼女」，一ノ瀬ちづる ④, 'Kanojo', Ichinose Chizuru 4); 60. "My 'Girlfriend,' Chizuru Ichinose 5" (「彼女」，一ノ瀬ちづる ⑤, 'Kanojo', Ichinose Chizuru 5); 61. "My 'Girlfriend,' Chizuru Ichinose 6" (「彼女」，一ノ瀬ちづる ⑥, 'Kanojo', Ichinose Chizuru 6); 62. "That Night and My Girlfriend 1" (夜と彼女 ①, Yoru to Kanojo 1); 63. "That Night and My Girlfriend 2" (夜と彼女 ②, Yoru to Kanojo 2); 64. "That Night and My Girlfriend 3" (夜と彼女 ③, Yoru to Kanojo 3); 65. "That Night and My Girlfriend 4" (夜と彼女 ④, Yoru to Kanojo 4); 66. "The Birthday and My Girlfriend 1" (誕生日と彼女 ①, Tanjōbi to Kanojo 1); 67. "The Birthday and My Girlfriend 2" (誕生日と彼女 ②, Tanjōbi to Kanojo 2)
9	March 15, 2019	978-4-06-514446-6	October 5, 2021	978-1-64-651093-1 (print); 978-1-63-699493-2 (digital)
Covers chapters in Weekly Shōnen Magazine from 2018 issue 51 to 2019 issue 9: 68. "The Birthday and My Girlfriend 3" (誕生日と彼女 ③, Tanjōbi to Kanojo 3); 69. "The Birthday and My Girlfriend 4" (誕生日と彼女 ④, Tanjōbi to Kanojo 4); 70. "Alcohol and My Girlfriend 1" (酒と彼女 ①, Sake to Kanojo 1); 71. "Alcohol and My Girlfriend 2" (酒と彼女 ②, Sake to Kanojo 2); 72. "Alcohol and My Girlfriend 3" (酒と彼女 ③, Sake to Kanojo 3); 73. "Alcohol and My Girlfriend 4" (酒と彼女 ④, Sake to Kanojo 4); 74. "The Hangover and My Girlfriend" (二日酔いと彼女, Futsukayoi to Kanojo); 75. "My Ex-Girlfriend and My 'Girlfriend' 1" (元カノと仮カノ ①, Moto Kano to Kari Kano 1); 76. "My Ex-Girlfriend and My 'Girlfriend' 2" (元カノと仮カノ ②, Moto Kano to Kari Kano 2)
10	May 17, 2019	978-4-06-515139-6	December 21, 2021 (digital); December 28, 2021 (print)	978-1-63-699587-8 (digital); 978-1-64-651094-8 (print)
Covers chapters in Weekly Shōnen Magazine from 2019 issues 10 to 18: 77. "My Ex-Girlfriend and My 'Girlfriend' 4" (元カノと彼女 ④, Moto Kano to Kanojo 4); 78. "My Girlfriend and My Dream Date 1" (彼女と夢のデート ①, Kanojo to Yume no Dēto 1); 79. "My Girlfriend and My Dream Date 2" (彼女と夢のデート ②, Kanojo to Yume no Dēto 2); 80. "My Girlfriend and My Dream Date 3" (彼女と夢のデート ③, Kanojo to Yume no Dēto 3); 81. "My Girlfriend and My Dream Date 4" (彼女と夢のデート ④, Kanojo to Yume no Dēto 4); 82. "My Girlfriend and My Dream Date 5" (彼女と夢のデート ⑤, Kanojo to Yume no Dēto 5); 83. "My Girlfriend, My House, and the Kiss 1" (彼女と実家とキス ①, Kanojo to Jikka to Kisu 1); 84. "My Girlfriend, My House, and the Kiss 2" (彼女と実家とキス ②, Kanojo to Jikka to Kisu 2); 85. "My Girlfriend, My House, and the Kiss 3" (彼女と実家とキス ③, Kanojo to Jikka to Kisu 3)
11	August 16, 2019	978-4-06-515727-5	March 15, 2022	978-1-64-651392-5 (print); 978-1-63-699689-9 (digital)
Covers chapters in Weekly Shōnen Magazine from 2019 issues 19 to 28: 86. "My Girlfriend, My House, and the Kiss 4" (彼女と実家とキス ④, Kanojo to Jikka to Kisu 4); 87. "My Girlfriend, My House, and the Kiss 5" (彼女と実家とキス ⑤, Kanojo to Jikka to Kisu 5); 88. "My Girlfriend, My House, and the Kiss 6" (彼女と実家とキス ⑥, Kanojo to Jikka to Kisu 6); 89. "My Girlfriend, My House, and the Kiss 7" (彼女と実家とキス ⑦, Kanojo to Hikka to Kisu 7); 90. "My Girlfriend and the Limit 1" (彼女と期限 ①, Kanojo to Kigen 1); 91. "My Girlfriend and the Limit 2" (彼女と期限 ②, Kanojo to Kigen 2); 92. "My Girlfriend and What I'm Capable of 1" (彼女と僕にできること ①, Kanojo to Boku ni Dekiru Koto 1); 93. "My Girlfriend and What I'm Capable of 2" (彼女と僕にできること ②, Kanojo to Boku ni Dekiru Koto 2); 94. "My Girlfriend and What I'm Capable of 3" (彼女と僕にできること ③, Kanojo to Boku ni Dekiru Koto 3)
12	October 17, 2019	978-4-06-517162-2	April 12, 2022	978-1-64-651393-2 (print); 978-1-68-491283-4 (digital)
Covers chapters in Weekly Shōnen Magazine from 2019 issues 29 to 36/37: 95. "My Girlfriend and What I'm Capable of 4" (彼女と僕にできること ④, Kanojo to Boku ni Dekiru Koto 4); 96. "My Girlfriend and What I'm Capable of 5" (彼女と僕にできること ⑤, Kanojo to Boku ni Dekiru Koto 5); 97. "My Girlfriend and What I'm Capable of 6" (彼女と僕にできること ⑥, Kanojo to Boku ni Dekiru Koto 6); 98. "My Girlfriend and What I'm Capable of 7" (彼女と僕にできること ⑦, Kanojo to Boku ni Dekiru Koto 7); 99. "My Girlfriend and What She's Capable of" (彼女と彼女にできること, Kanojo to kanojo ni Dekiru Koto); 100. "My 'Girlfriend,' Chizuru Mizuhara 2" (「彼女」、水原千鶴 ②, 'Kanojo', Mizuhara Chizuru 2); 101. "My 'Girlfriend,' Chizuru Mizuhara 3" (「彼女」、水原千鶴 ③, 'Kanojo', Mizuhara Chizuru 3); 102. "My Dreams and My Girlfriend 5" (夢と彼女 ⑤, Yume to Kanojo 5); 103. "My Dreams, My Girlfriend, and Me" (夢と彼女と俺, Yume to Kanojo to Ore)
13	December 17, 2019	978-4-06-517546-0	June 14, 2022	978-1-64-651394-9 (print); 978-1-68-491304-6 (digital)
Covers chapters in Weekly Shōnen Magazine from 2019 issues 38 to 46: 104. "My Girlfriend and Splitting" (割り勘と彼女, Warikan to Kanojo); 105. "The Girl Next Door 2" (隣の彼女 ②, Tonari no Kanojo 2); 106. "The Girl Next Door 3" (隣の彼女 ③, Tonari no Kanojo 3); 107. "Room 203 and My Girlfriend 1" (２０３と彼女 ①, 203 to Kanojo 1); 108. "Room 203 and My Girlfriend 2" (２０３と彼女 ②, 203 to Kanojo 2); 109. "The Rice Omelet and My Girlfriend" (オムライスと彼女, Omuraisu to Kanojo); 110. "Room 203, My Girlfriend, and My Girlfriend 1" (２０３と彼女と彼女 ①, 203 to Kanojo to Kanojo 1); 111. "Room 203, My Girlfriend, and My Girlfriend 2" (２０３と彼女と彼女 ②, 203 to Kanojo to Kanojo 2); 112. "The Boyfriend and the Girlfriend" (彼と彼女, Kare to Kanojo)
14	March 17, 2020	978-4-06-518556-8	August 16, 2022 (digital); October 4, 2022 (print)	978-1-68-491612-2 (digital); 978-1-64-651533-2 (print)
Covers chapters in Weekly Shōnen Magazine from 2019 issue 47 to 2020 issue 5: 113. "The Girl Next Door 4" (隣の彼女 ④, Tonari no Kanojo 4); 114. "The Girl Next Door 5" (隣の彼女 ⑤, Tonari no Kanojo 5); 115. "The Girl Next Door 6" (隣の彼女 ⑥, Tonari no Kanojo 6); 116. "The Script and My Girlfriend" (脚本と彼女, Kyakuhon to Kanojo); 117. "The Director and My Girlfriend" (監督と彼女, Kantoku to Kanojo); 118. "My Girlfriend, My Girlfriend, and My Girlfriend 1" (彼女と彼女と彼女 ①, Kanojo to Kanojo to Kanojo 1); 119. "My Girlfriend, My Girlfriend, and My Girlfriend 2" (彼女と彼女と彼女 ②, Kanojo to Kanojo to Kanojo 2); 120. "My Girlfriends and Passing Out Fliers" (彼女たちとビラ配り, Kanojotachi to Birakubari); 121. "My Girlfriend and Room 204 1" (彼女と204 ①, Kanojo to 204 1)
15	June 17, 2020	978-4-06-519178-1	November 29, 2022	978-1-64-651534-9 (print); 978-1-68-491683-2 (digital)
122. "My Girlfriend and Room 204 2" (彼女と204 ②, Kanojo to 204 2); 123. "The Final Day and My Girlfriend 1" (最終日と彼女①, Saishū-bi to Kanojo 1); 124. "The Final Day and My Girlfriend 2" (最終日と彼女②, Saishū-bi to Kanojo 2); 125. "The Final Day and My Girlfriend 3" (最終日と彼女③, Saishū-bi to Kanojo 3); 126. "The Final Day and My Girlfriend 4" (最終日と彼女④, Saishū-bi to Kanojo 4); 127. "The Final Day and My Girlfriend 5" (最終日と彼女⑤, Saishū-bi to Kanojo 5); 128. "Introductions and My Girlfriend" (挨拶と彼女, Aisatsu to Kanojo); 129. "Shooting and My Girlfriend 1" (撮影と彼女 ①, Satsuei to Kanojo 1); 130. "Shooting and My Girlfriend 2" (撮影と彼女 ②, Satsuei to Kanojo 2)
16	August 17, 2020	978-4-06-520332-3	December 20, 2022	978-1-64-651535-6 (print); 978-1-68-491741-9 (digital)
131. "Shooting and My Girlfriend 3" (撮影と彼女 ③, Satsuei to Kanojo 3); 132. "The Last Scene and My Girlfriend 1" (ラストシーンと彼女 ①, Rasutoshīn to Kanojo 1); 133. "The Last Scene and My Girlfriend 2" (ラストシーンと彼女 ②, Rasutoshīn to Kanojo 2); 134. "The Last Scene and My Girlfriend 3" (最ラストシーンと彼女 ③, Rasutoshīn to Kanojo 3); 135. "The Last Scene and My Girlfriend 4" (ラストシーンと彼女 ④, Rasutoshīn to Kanojo 4); 136. "The Last Scene and My Girlfriend 5" (ラストシーンと彼女 ⑤, Rasutoshīn to Kanojo 5); 137. "The Last Scene and My Girlfriend 6" (ラストシーンと彼女 ⑥, Rasutoshīn to Kanojo 6); 138. "The Last Scene and My Girlfriend 7" (ラストシーンと彼女 ⑦, Rasutoshīn to Kanojo 7); 139. "The Wish and My Girlfriend 1" (願い事と彼女 ①, Negaigoto to Kanojo 1)
17	September 17, 2020	978-4-06-520600-3	February 14, 2023 (digital); February 28, 2023 (print)	978-1-68-491871-3 (digital); 978-1-64-651536-3 (print)
140. "The Wish and My Girlfriend 2" (願い事と彼女 ②, Negaigoto to Kanojo 2); 141. "The Wish and My Girlfriend 3" (願い事と彼女 ③, Negaigoto to Kanojo 3); 142. "The Wish and My Girlfriend 4" (願い事と彼女 ④, Negaigoto to Kanojo 4); 143. "My Girlfriend and the Seedling" (彼女と芽, Kanojo to Me); 144. "Kazuya and His Girlfriend" (和也と彼女, Kazuya to Kanojo); 145. "Family and My Girlfriend 1" (家族と彼女 ①, Kazoku to Kanojo 1); 146. "Family and My Girlfriend 2" (家族と彼女 ②, Kazoku to Kanojo 2); 147. "Lies and My Girlfriend 1" (嘘と彼女 ①, Uso to Kanojo 1); 148. "Lies and My Girlfriend 2" (嘘と彼女 ②, Uso to Kanojo 2)
18	November 17, 2020	978-4-06-521253-0	April 11, 2023 (digital); April 18, 2023 (print)	978-1-68-491952-9 (digital); 978-1-64-651537-0 (print)
149. "My Dreams, My Girlfriend, and Me 2" (夢と彼女と俺 ②, Yume to Kanojo to Ore 2); 150. "Lies and My Girlfriend 3" (嘘と彼女 ③, Uso to Kanojo 3); 151. "Lies and My Girlfriend 4" (嘘と彼女 ④, Uso to Kanojo 4); 152. "Lies and My Girlfriend 5" (嘘と彼女 ⑤, Uso to Kanojo 5); 153. "Separations and My Girlfriend" (お別れと彼女, Owakare to Kanojo); 154. "Resolve and My Girlfriend" (思いきりと彼女, Omoikiri to Kanojo); 155. "My Girlfriend and the Sudden Trip 1" (彼女と突発旅行 ①, Kanojo to Toppatsu Ryokō 1); 156. "My Girlfriend and the Sudden Trip 2" (彼女と突発旅行 ②, Kanojo to Toppatsu Ryokō 2); 157. "My Girlfriend and Her Boyfriend 1" (彼女と彼氏 ①, Kanojo to Kareshi 1)
19	February 17, 2021	978-4-06-521641-5	June 13, 2023	978-1-64-651538-7 (print); 979-8-88-933013-4 (digital)
158. "My Girlfriend and Her Boyfriend 2" (彼女と彼氏 ②, Kanojo to Kareshi 2); 159. "My Girlfriend and Her Boyfriend 3" (彼女と彼氏 ③, Kanojo to Kareshi 3); 160. "My Girlfriend and Her Boyfriend 4" (彼女と彼氏 ④, Kanojo to Kareshi 4); 161. "My Girlfriend and Her Boyfriend 5" (彼女と彼氏 ⑤, Kanojo to Kareshi 5); 162. "My Girlfriend and Her Boyfriend 6" (彼女と彼氏 ⑥, Kanojo to Kareshi 6); 163. "My Girlfriend and Her Boyfriend 7" (彼女と彼氏 ⑦, Kanojo to Kareshi 7); 164. "My Girlfriend and Her Boyfriend 8" (彼女と彼氏 ⑧, Kanojo to Kareshi 8); 165. "My Girlfriend and Tears 1" (彼女と涙 ①, Kanojo to Namida 1); 166. "My Girlfriend and Tears 2" (彼女と涙 ②, Kanojo to Namida 2)
20	April 16, 2021	978-4-06-522978-1	August 22, 2023	978-1-64-651539-4 (print); 979-8-88-933211-4 (digital)
167. "The Premiere and My Girlfriend" (上映会と彼女, Jōei-kai to Kanojo); 168. "The Boyfriend and His Daily Life" (彼と日常, Kare to Nichijō); 169. "The Hot Springs and My (Tentative) Girlfriend" (温泉と仮カノ, Onsen to Kari Kano); 170. "The Love Agony and My Girlfriend" (恋苦と彼女, Koi ku to Kanojo); 171. "The Date (?) and My Girlfriend 1" (デート？と彼女 ①, Dēto? To Kanojo 1); 172. "The Date (?) and My Girlfriend 2" (デート？と彼女 ②, Dēto? To Kanojo 2); 173. "The Confession and My Girlfriend 1" (告白と彼女 ①, Kokuhaku to Kanojo 1); 174. "The Confession and My Girlfriend 2" (告白と彼女 ②, Kokuhaku to Kanojo 2); 175. "The Sigh and My Girlfriend" (溜め息と彼女, Tameiki to Kanojo)
21	June 17, 2021	978-4-06-523582-9	October 24, 2023	978-1-64-651540-0 (print); 979-8-88-933243-5 (digital)
176. "The Tiger's Den and My Girlfriend 1" (虎穴と彼女 ①, Koketsu to Kanojo 1); 177. "The Tiger's Den and My Girlfriend 2" (虎穴と彼女 ②, Koketsu to Kanojo 2); 178. "The Tiger's Den and My Girlfriend 3" (虎穴と彼女 ③, Koketsu to Kanojo 3); 179. "The Tiger's Den and My Girlfriend 4" (虎穴と彼女 ④, Koketsu to Kanojo 4); 180. "The Determination and My Girlfriend 1" (決意と彼女 ①, Ketsui to Kanojo 1); 181. "The Determination and My Girlfriend 2" (決意と彼女 ②, Ketsui to Kanojo 2); 182. "My Friend and My Girlfriend 2" (友達と彼女 ②, Tomodachi to Kanojo 2); 183. "My Girlfriend and My Ex 5" (元カノと彼女 ⑤, Moto Kano to Kanojo 5); 184. "That Moment and My Girlfriend" (その時と彼女, Sonotoki to Kanojo)
22	August 17, 2021	978-4-06-524487-6	December 19, 2023	978-1-64-651541-7 (print); 979-8-88-933359-3 (digital)
185. "Maximum Security and My Girlfriend" (全力警備と彼女, Zenryoku Keibi to Kanojo); 186. "The No-Go and My Girlfriend" (NGと彼女, NG to Kanojo); 187. "My Temporary Girlfriend and My Girlfriend" (仮カノと彼女, Kari Kano to Kanojo); 188. "Paradise and My Girlfriend 1" (楽園と彼女 ①, Rakuen to Kanojo 1); 189. "Paradise and My Girlfriend 2" (楽園と彼女 ②, Rakuen to Kanojo 2); 190. "Paradise and My Girlfriend 3" (楽園と彼女 ③, Rakuen to Kanojo 3); 191. "Paradise and My Girlfriend 4" (楽園と彼女 ④, Rakuen to Kanojo 4); 192. "Paradise and My Girlfriend 5" (楽園と彼女 ⑤, Rakuen to Kanojo 5); 193. "Paradise and My Girlfriend 6" (楽園と彼女 ⑥, Rakuen to Kanojo 6); Bonus: "Rent-A-Girlfriend Reincarnated" (彼女、転生します, Kanojo, Tensei Shimasu)
23	October 15, 2021	978-4-06-525140-9	March 5, 2024	978-1-64-651635-3 (print); 979-8-88-933517-7 (digital)
194. "Paradise and My Girlfriend 7" (楽園と彼女 ⑦, Rakuen to Kanojo 7); 195. "Paradise and My Girlfriend 8" (楽園と彼女 ⑧, Rakuen to Kanojo 8); 196. "Paradise and My Girlfriend 9" (楽園と彼女 ⑨, Rakuen to Kanojo 9); 197. "Paradise and My Girlfriend 10" (楽園と彼女 ⑩, Rakuen to Kanojo 10); 198. "Paradise and My Girlfriend 11" (楽園と彼女 ⑪, Rakuen to Kanojo 11); 199. "Paradise and My Girlfriend 12" (楽園と彼女 ⑫, Rakuen to Kanojo 12); 200. "Paradise and My Girlfriend 13" (楽園と彼女 ⑬, Rakuen to Kanojo 13); 201. "Paradise and My Girlfriend 14" (楽園と彼女 ⑭, Rakuen to Kanojo 14); 202. "Paradise and My Girlfriend 15" (楽園と彼女 ⑮, Rakuen to Kanojo 15)
24	December 17, 2021	978-4-06-526285-6	April 16, 2024	978-1-64-651748-0 (print); 979-8-88-933556-6 (digital)
203. "Paradise and My Girlfriend 16" (楽園と彼女 ⑯, Rakuen to Kanojo 16); 204. "Paradise and My Girlfriend 17" (楽園と彼女 ⑰, Rakuen to kanojo 17); 205. "Paradise and My Girlfriend 18" (楽園と彼女 ⑱, Rakuen to Kanojo 18); 206. "Paradise and My Girlfriend 19" (楽園と彼女 ⑲, Rakuen to Kanojo 19); 207. "Paradise and My Girlfriend 20" (楽園と彼女 ⑳, Rakuen to Kanojo 20); 208. "Paradise and My Girlfriend 21" (楽園と彼女 ㉑, Rakuen to Kanojo 21); 209. "Paradise and My Girlfriend 22" (楽園と彼女 ㉒, Rakuen to Kanojo 22); 210. "Paradise and My Girlfriend 23" (楽園と彼女 ㉓, Rakuen to Kanojo 23); 211. "Paradise and My Girlfriend 24" (楽園と彼女 ㉔, Rakuen to Kanojo 24)
25	February 17, 2022	978-4-06-526894-0	June 18, 2024 (digital); July 2, 2024 (print)	979-8-88-933677-8 (digital); 978-1-64-651749-7 (print)
212. "Paradise and My Girlfriend 25" (楽園と彼女 ㉕, Rakuen to Kanojo 25); 213. "Paradise and My Girlfriend 26" (楽園と彼女 ㉖, Rakuen to Kanojo 26); 214. "Paradise and My Girlfriend 27" (楽園と彼女 ㉗, Rakuen to Kanojo 27); 215. "My Ex, Mami Nanami 2" (「元カノ」、七海麻美 ②, 'Moto Kano', Nanami Mami 2); 216. "Paradise and My Girlfriend 28" (楽園と彼女 ㉘, Rakuen to Kanojo 28); 217. "Paradise and My Girlfriend 29" (楽園と彼女 ㉙, Rakuen to Kanojo 29); 218. "Paradise and My Girlfriend 30" (楽園と彼女 ㉚, Rakuen to Kanojo 30); 219. "Paradise and My Girlfriend 31" (楽園と彼女 ㉛, Rakuen to Kanojo 31); 220. "Paradise and My Girlfriend 32" (楽園と彼女 ㉜, Rakuen to Kanojo 32)
26	May 17, 2022	978-4-06-527923-6	September 3, 2024	978-1-64-651799-2 (print); 979-8-89-478040-5 (digital)
221. "Paradise and My Girlfriend 33" (楽園と彼女 ㉝, Rakuen to Kanojo 33); 222. "Paradise and My Girlfriend 34" (楽園と彼女 ㉞, Rakuen to Kanojo 34); 223. "Paradise and My Girlfriend 35" (楽園と彼女 ㉟, Rakuen to Kanojo 35); 224. "Paradise and My Girlfriend 36" (楽園と彼女 ㊱, Rakuen to Kanojo 36); 225. "Paradise and My Girlfriend 37" (楽園と彼女 ㊲, Rakuen to Kanojo 37); 226. "Paradise and My Girlfriend 38" (楽園と彼女 ㊳, Rakuen to Kanojo 38); 227. "Paradise and My Girlfriend 39" (楽園と彼女 ㊴, Rakuen to Kanojo 39); 228. "Paradise and My Girlfriend 40" (楽園と彼女 ㊵, Rakuen to Kanojo 40)
27	July 15, 2022	978-4-06-528497-1	October 22, 2024	978-1-64-651827-2 (print); 979-8-89-478149-5 (digital)
229. "Paradise and My Girlfriend 41" (楽園と彼女 ㊶, Rakuen to Kanojo 41); 230. "Paradise and My Girlfriend 42" (楽園と彼女 ㊷, Rakuen to Kanojo 42); 231. "Paradise and My Girlfriend Final" (楽園と彼女（終）, Rakuen to Kanojo (Tsui)); 232. "The Kiss and My Girlfriend 1" (キスと彼女①, Kisu to Kanojo 1); 233. "The Kiss and My Girlfriend 2" (キスと彼女②, Kisu to Kanojo 2); 234. "The Kiss and My Girlfriend 3" (キスと彼女③, Kisu to Kanojo 3); 235. "The Kiss and My Girlfriend 4" (キスと彼女④, Kisu to Kanojo 4); 236. "The Kiss and My Girlfriend 5" (キスと彼女⑤, Kisu to Kanojo 5); 237. "The Kiss and My Girlfriend 6" (キスと彼女⑥, Kisu to Kanojo 6)
28	September 16, 2022	978-4-06-529128-3	December 17, 2024	978-1-64-651930-9 (print); 979-8-89-478331-4 (digital)
238. "The Kiss and My Girlfriend 7" (キスと彼女⑦, Kisu to Kanojo 7); 239. "The Kiss and My Girlfriend 8" (キスと彼女⑧, Kisu to Kanojo 8); 240. "The Assessment and My Girlfriend 1" (調査と彼女①, Chōsa to Kanojo 1) (Note: This chapter was erroneously titled "The Kiss and My Girlfriend 9" (キスと彼女⑨, Kisu to Kanojo 9) in Weekly Shōnen Magazine.); 241. "The Assessment and My Girlfriend 2" (調査と彼女②, Chōsa to Kanojo 2); 242. "The Assessment and My Girlfriend 3" (調査と彼女③, Chōsa to Kanojo 3); 243. "The Bra and My Girlfriend" (ブラと彼女, Bura to Kanojo); 244. "LINE and My Girlfriend" (LI(文)N(通)Eと彼女, LINE (Buntsū) to Kanojo); 245. "The Childhood Home and My Girlfriend 1" (育った家と彼女①, Sodatta Ie to Kanojo 1); 246. "The Childhood Home and My Girlfriend 2" (育った家と彼女②, Sodatta Ie to Kanojo 2)
29	December 16, 2022	978-4-06-529936-4	February 18, 2025 (digital); March 4, 2025 (print)	979-8-89-478416-8 (digital); 978-1-64-651988-0 (print)
247. "The Childhood Home and My Girlfriend 3" (育った家と彼女③, Sodatta Ie to Kanojo 3); 248. "The Childhood Home and My Girlfriend 4" (育った家と彼女④, Sodatta Ie to Kanojo 4); 249. "Moving Out and My Girlfriend 1" (引っ越しと彼女①, Hikkoshi to Kanojo 1); 250. "Moving Out and My Girlfriend 2" (引っ越しと彼女②, Hikkoshi to Kanojo 2); 251. "Moving Out and My Girlfriend 3" (引っ越しと彼女③, Hikkoshi to Kanojo 3); 252. "Moving Out and My Girlfriend 4" (引っ越しと彼女④, Hikkoshi to Kanojo 4); 253. "Moving Out and My Girlfriend 5" (引っ越しと彼女⑤, Hikkoshi to Kanojo 5); 254. "Moving Out and My Girlfriend 6" (引っ越しと彼女⑥, Hikkoshi to Kanojo 6); 255. "Moving Out and My Girlfriend 7" (引っ越しと彼女⑦, Hikkoshi to Kanojo 7)
30	February 17, 2023	978-4-06-530643-7	April 22, 2025	979-8-88-877001-6 (print); 979-8-89-478535-6 (digital)
256. "Living Under the Same Roof with My Girlfriend 1" (彼女と一つ屋根の下①, Kanojo to Hitotsu Yane no Shimo 1); 257. "Living Under the Same Roof with My Girlfriend 2" (彼女と一つ屋根の下②, Kanojo to Hitotsu Yane no Shimo 2); 258. "The Bath and My Girlfriend" (バスと彼女, Basu to Kanojo); 259. "The Bath and My Girlfriend 2" (バスと彼女②, Basu to Kanojo 2); 260. "The Washbasin and My Girlfriend" (洗面台と彼女, Senmendai to Kanojo); 261. "The Cat and My Girlfriend" (猫と彼女, Neko to Kanojo); 262. "The Birthday and My Girlfriend 2 (1)" (誕生日と彼女2①, Tanjōbi to Kanojo 2 (1)); 263. The Bathroom and My Girlfriend" (お手洗いと彼女, Otearai to Kanojo); 264. "The Bandage and My Girlfriend" (包帯と彼女, Hōtai to Kanojo)
31	May 17, 2023	978-4-06-531573-6	June 17, 2025	979-8-88-877125-9 (print); 979-8-89-478601-8 (digital)
265. "The Birthday and My Girlfriend 2 (2)" (誕生日と彼女2②, Tanjōbi to Kanojo 2 (2)); 266. "The Birthday and My Girlfriend 2 (3)" (誕生日と彼女2③, Tanjōbi to Kanojo 2 (3)); 267. "The Birthday and My Girlfriend 2 (4)" (誕生日と彼女2④, Tanjōbi to Kanojo 2 (4)); 268. "The Birthday and My Girlfriend 2 (5)" (誕生日と彼女2⑤, Tanjōbi to Kanojo 2 (5)); 269. "The Birthday and My Girlfriend 2 (6)" (誕生日と彼女2⑥, Tanjōbi to Kanojo 2 (6)); 270. "The Birthday and My Girlfriend 2 (7)" (誕生日と彼女2⑦, Tanjōbi to Kanojo 2 (7)); 271. "The Birthday and My Girlfriend 2 (8)" (誕生日と彼女2⑧, Tanjōbi to Kanojo 2 (8)); 272. "Progress and My Girlfriend" (進捗と彼女, Shinchoku to Kanojo); 273. "The Birthday Suit and My Girlfriend" (丸裸と彼女, Maruhadaka to Kanojo)
32	July 14, 2023	978-4-06-532184-3	August 19, 2025	979-8-88-877156-3 (print); 979-8-89-478675-9 (digital)
274. "Living Under the Same Roof with My Girlfriend 3" (彼女と一つ屋根の下③, Kanojo to Hitotsu Yane no Shimo 3); 275. "Living Under the Same Roof with My Girlfriend 4" (彼女と一つ屋根の下④, Kanojo to Hitotsu Yane no Shimo 4); 276. "Living Under the Same Roof with My Girlfriend 5" (彼女と一つ屋根の下⑤, Kanojo to Hitotsu Yane no Shimo 5); 277. "Shopping with My Girlfriend 1" (彼女と買い物①, Kanojo to Kaimono 1); 278. "Shopping with My Girlfriend 2" (彼女と買い物②, Kanojo to Kaimono 2); 279. "Shopping with My Girlfriend 3" (彼女と買い物③, Kanojo to Kaimono 3); 280. "Shopping with My Girlfriend 4" (彼女と買い物④, Kanojo to Kaimono 4); 281. "The Spider and My Girlfriend" (彼女と蜘蛛, Kanojo to Kumo); 282. "The Convenience Store at Night with My Girlfriend" (彼女と夜のコンビニ, Kanojo to Yoru no Konbini)
33	September 14, 2023	978-4-06-532893-4	October 21, 2025	979-8-88-877241-6 (print); 979-8-89-478722-0 (digital)
283. "Kazuya" ("和也"); 284. "Recreation with My Girlfriend" (彼女とレクリエーション, Kanojo to Rekuriēshon); 285. "Recreation with My Girlfriend 2" (彼女とレクリエーション②, Kanojo to Rekuriēshon 2); 286. "Recreation with My Girlfriend 3" (彼女とレクリエーション③, Kanojo to Rekuriēshon 3); 287. "My Girlfriend and Her Friend 1" (彼女と彼女の友達①, Kanojo to Kanojo no Tomodachi 1); 288. "My Girlfriend and Her Friend 2" (彼女と彼女の友達②, Kanojo to Kanojo no Tomodachi 2); 289. "My Girlfriend and Her Friend 3" (彼女と彼女の友達③, Kanojo to Kanojo no Tomodachi 3); 290. "Going Out with My Girlfriend 1" (お出掛けと彼女①, Odekake to Kanojo 1); 291. "Going Out with My Girlfriend 2" (お出掛けと彼女②, Odekake to Kanojo 2)
34	November 16, 2023	978-4-06-533553-6	December 30, 2025	979-8-88-877270-6 (print); 979-8-89-478800-5 (digital)
292. "My Girlfriend and the Kids 1" (こどもと彼女①, Kodomo to Kanojo 1); 293. "My Girlfriend and the Kids 2" (こどもと彼女②, Kodomo to Kanojo 2); 294. "My Girlfriend and the Kids 3" (こどもと彼女③, Kodomo to Kanojo 3); 295. "My Girlfriend and the Kids 4" (こどもと彼女④, Kodomo to Kanojo 4); 296. "My Girlfriend and the Kids 5" (こどもと彼女⑤, Kodomo to Kanojo 5); 297. "The Assessment and My Girlfriend 4" (調査と彼女④, Chōsa to Kanojo 4); 298. "My Girlfriend and the Touch" (彼女とボディタッチ, Kanojo to Boditatchi); 299. "My Girlfriend and the Laundry" (洗濯物と彼女, Sentakubutsu to Kanojo); 300. "My Girlfriend and the Card Game" (糸と彼女, Ito to Kanojo)
35	February 16, 2024	978-4-06-534568-9	February 24, 2026	979-8-88-877336-9 (print); 979-8-89-478887-6 (digital)
301. "My Girlfriend and the Card Game 2" (糸と彼女②, Ito to Kanojo 2); 302. "My Girlfriend and the Card Game 3" (糸と彼女③, Ito to Kanojo 3); 303. "My Friend and My Girlfriend 3" (友達と彼女③, Tomodachi to Kanojo 3); 304. "My Girlfriend and 'That Time' 1" (アレと彼女①, Are to Kanojo 1); 305. "My Girlfriend and 'That Time' 2" (アレと彼女②, Are to Kanojo 2); 306. "My Girlfriend and 'That Time' 3" (アレと彼女③, Are to Kanojo 3); 307. "My Girlfriend and the Rental Date 1" (レンカノと彼女①, Renkano to Kanojo 1); 308. "My Girlfriend and the Rental Date 2" (レンカノと彼女②, Renkano to Kanojo 2); 309. "My Girlfriend and the Rental Date 3" (レンカノと彼女③, Renkano to Kanojo 3)
36	April 17, 2024	978-4-06-535136-9	April 28, 2026	979-8-88-877389-5 (print); 979-8-89-830063-0 (digital)
310. "Cosplay and My Girlfriend 1" (コスプレと彼女①, Kosupure to Kanojo 1); 311. "Cosplay and My Girlfriend 2" (コスプレと彼女②, Kosupure to Kanojo 2); 312. "Cosplay and My Girlfriend 3" (コスプレと彼女③, Kosupure to Kanojo 3); 313. "Cosplay and My Girlfriend 4" (コスプレと彼女④, Kosupure to Kanojo 4); 314. "Asking Out My Girlfriend" (お誘いと彼女, Osasoi to Kanojo); 315. "Asking Out My Girlfriend 2" (お誘いと彼女②, Osasoi to Kanojo 2); 316. "Asking Out My Girlfriend 3" (お誘いと彼女③, Osasoi to Kanojo 3); 317. "My Girlfriend and the Schedule" (スケジュールと彼女, Sukejūru to Kanojo); 318. "My Girlfriend and the Mole" (黒(ほ)子(くろ)と彼女, Hokuro to Kanojo)
37	July 17, 2024	978-4-06-536161-0	July 7, 2026	979-8-88-877473-1 (print); 979-8-89-830146-0 (digital)
319. "My Girlfriend and the Troubles" (悩みと彼女, Nayami to Kanojo); 320. "My Girlfriend and the Ball" (球と彼女, Kyū to Kanojo); 321. "The Date and the Boyfriend" (デートと彼, Dēto to Kare); 322. "The Date and the Boyfriend 2" (デートと彼②, Dēto to Kare 2); 323. "The Date and the Boyfriend 3" (デートと彼③, Dēto to Kare 3); 324. "The Date and the Boyfriend 4" (デートと彼④, Dēto to Kare 4); 325. "The Date and the Boyfriend 5" (デートと彼⑤, Dēto to Kare 5); 326. "The Date and the Boyfriend 6" (デートと彼⑥, Dēto to Kare 6); 327. "The Date and the Boyfriend 7" (デートと彼⑦, Dēto to Kare 7)
38	October 17, 2024	978-4-06-537133-6	August 18, 2026	979-8-88-877527-1 (print); 979-8-89-830197-2 (digital)
328. "The Date and the Boyfriend 8" (デートと彼⑧, Dēto to Kare 8); 329. "The Date and the Boyfriend 9" (デートと彼⑨, Dēto to Kare 9); 330. "The Date and the Boyfriend 10" (デートと彼⑩, Dēto to Kare 10); 331. "The Date and the Boyfriend 11" (デートと彼⑪, Dēto to Kare 11); 332. "The Date and the Boyfriend 12" (デートと彼⑫, Dēto to Kare 12); 333. "The Date and the Boyfriend 13" (デートと彼⑬, Dēto to Kare 13); 334. "The Date and the Boyfriend 14" (デートと彼⑭, Dēto to Kare 14); 335. "The Date and the Boyfriend 15" (デートと彼⑮, Dēto to Kare 15); 336. "The Date and the Boyfriend 16" (デートと彼⑯, Dēto to Kare 16)
39	January 17, 2025	978-4-06-538062-8	October 27, 2026	979-8-88877-624-7
337. "The Date and the Boyfriend 17" (デートと彼⑰, Dēto to Kare 17); 338. "The Date and the Boyfriend 18" (デートと彼⑱, Dēto to Kare 18); 339. "The Date and the Boyfriend 19" (デートと彼⑲, Dēto to Kare 19); 340. "The Date and the Boyfriend 20" (デートと彼⑳, Dēto to Kare 20); 341. "The Date and the Boyfriend 21" (デートと彼㉑, Dēto to Kare 21); 342. "The Date and the Boyfriend 22" (デートと彼㉒, Dēto to Kare 22); 343. "The Date and the Boyfriend 23" (デートと彼㉓, Dēto to Kare 23); 344. "The Date and the Boyfriend 24" (デートと彼㉔, Dēto to Kare 24); 345. "The Remaining Days with My Girlfriend" (残りの日々と彼女, Nokori no Hibi to Kanojo)
40	April 16, 2025	978-4-06-539099-3	December 29, 2026	979-8-88877-682-7
346. "My Girlfriend and Her Name" (名前と彼女, Namae to Kanojo); 347. "My Girlfriend and the Secret" (秘密と彼女, Himitsu to Kanojo); 348. "My Girlfriend and the Secret 2" (秘密と彼女②, Himitsu to Kanojo 2); 349. "My Girlfriend and Her Goal" (目標と彼女, Mokuhyō to Kanojo); 350. "My Girlfriend and the Two Days Before" (彼女と2日前, Kanojo to Futsuka Mae); 351. "The Boyfriend and the Day Before" (前日と彼, Zenjitsu to Kare); 352. "My Girlfriend and Love 1" (恋心と彼女①, Koigokoro to Kanojo 1); 353. "My Girlfriend and Love 2" (恋心と彼女②, Koigokoro to Kanojo 2); 354. "My Girlfriend and Love 3" (恋心と彼女③, Koigokoro to Kanojo 3)
41	July 16, 2025	978-4-06-540007-4; 978-4-06-540251-1 (SE)	February 23, 2027	979-8-88877-813-5
355. "My Girlfriend and Love 4" (恋心と彼女④, Koigokoro to Kanojo 4); 356. "My Girlfriend and Love 5" (恋心と彼女⑤, Koigokoro to Kanojo 5); 357. "My Girlfriend and Love 6" (恋心と彼女⑥, Koigokoro to Kanojo 6); 358. "My Girlfriend and Love 7" (恋心と彼女⑦, Koigokoro to Kanojo 7); 359. "My Girlfriend and Love 8" (恋心と彼女⑧, Koigokoro to Kanojo 8); 360. "My Girlfriend and Love 9" (恋心と彼女⑨, Koigokoro to Kanojo 9); 361. "My Girlfriend and Love 10" (恋心と彼女⑩, Koigokoro to Kanojo 10); 362. "My Girlfriend and Love 11" (恋心と彼女⑪, Koigokoro to Kanojo 11); 363. "My Girlfriend and Love 12" (恋心と彼女⑫, Koigokoro to Kanojo 12)
42	September 17, 2025	978-4-06-540741-7	April 27, 2027	979-8-88877-900-2
364. "My Girlfriend and Love 13" (恋心と彼女⑬, Koigokoro to Kanojo 13); 365. "My Girlfriend and Love 14" (恋心と彼女⑭, Koigokoro to Kanojo 14); 366. "My Girlfriend and Love 15" (恋心と彼女⑮, Koigokoro to Kanojo 15); 367. "My Girlfriend and Love 16" (恋心と彼女⑯, Koigokoro to Kanojo 16); 368. "My Girlfriend and Love 17" (恋心と彼女⑰, Koigokoro to Kanojo 17); 369. "My Girlfriend and Love 18" (恋心と彼女⑱, Koigokoro to Kanojo 18); 370. "My Girlfriend and Love 19" (恋心と彼女⑲, Koigokoro to Kanojo 19); 371. "My Girlfriend and Love 20" (恋心と彼女⑳, Koigokoro to Kanojo 20); 372. "My Girlfriend and Love 21" (恋心と彼女㉑, Koigokoro to Kanojo 21)
43	November 17, 2025	978-4-06-541559-7	TBA	—
373. "My Girlfriend and Love 22" (恋心と彼女㉒, Koigokoro to Kanojo 22); 374. "My Girlfriend and Love 23" (恋心と彼女㉓, Koigokoro to Kanojo 23); 375. "My Girlfriend and Love 24" (恋心と彼女㉔, Koigokoro to Kanojo 24); 376. "My Girlfriend and Love 25" (恋心と彼女㉕, Koigokoro to Kanojo 25); 377. "My Girlfriend and Love 26" (恋心と彼女㉖, Koigokoro to Kanojo 26); 378. "My Girlfriend and Love 27" (恋心と彼女㉗, Koigokoro to Kanojo 27); 379. "My Girlfriend and Love 28" (恋心と彼女㉘, Koigokoro to Kanojo 28); 380. "My Girlfriend and Love 29" (恋心と彼女㉙, Koigokoro to Kanojo 29); 381. "My Girlfriend and Love 30" (恋心と彼女㉚, Koigokoro to Kanojo 30)
44	January 16, 2026	978-4-06-542210-6	TBA	—
382. "My Girlfriend and Love 31" (恋心と彼女㉛, Koigokoro to Kanojo 31); 383. "My Girlfriend and Love 32" (恋心と彼女㉜, Koigokoro to Kanojo 32); 384. "Parting Ways with My Girlfriend 1" (別れ際と彼女①, Wakaregiwa to Kanojo 1); 385. "Parting Ways with My Girlfriend 2" (別れ際と彼女②, Wakaregiwa to Kanojo 2); 386. "The Boyfriend and the Kiss" (そのキスと彼, Sono Kisu to Kare); 387. "My Girlfriend and the Kiss" (そのキスと彼女, Sono Kisu to Kanojo); 388. "The Two and the Kiss" (そのキスと2人, Sono Kisu to Futari); 389. "My Girlfriend and the Fateful Day 1" (運命の日と彼女①, Unmei no Hi to Kanojo 1); 390. "My Girlfriend and the Fateful Day 2" (運命の日と彼女②, Unmei no Hi to Kanojo 2)
45	April 16, 2026	978-4-06-543328-7	TBA	—
391. "The Boyfriend and the News" (知らせと彼, Shirase to Kare); 392. "My Girlfriend and Her Dad" (父と彼女, Chichi to Kanojo); 393. "The Boyfriend and Goals" (目標と彼, Mokuhyō to Kare); 394. "My Girlfriend and Drawing the Line 1" (ケジメと彼女①, Kejime to Kanojo 1); 395. "My Girlfriend and Drawing the Line 2" (ケジメと彼女②, Kejime to Kanojo 2); 396. "The Boyfriend and the Panic" (焦りと彼, Aseri to Kare); 397. "My Girlfriend and the Moon" (月と彼女, Tsuki to Kanojo); 398. "Parting Ways with My Girlfriend 3" (別れ際と彼女③, Wakaregiwa to Kanojo 3); 399. "The Boyfriend and His Daily Life 2" (彼と日常②, Kare to Nichijō 2)
46	June 17, 2026	978-4-06-543888-6	TBA	—
400. "My Girlfriend and the School Bag 1" (彼女とスクールバッグ①, Kanojo to Sukūru Baggu 1); 401. "My Girlfriend and the School Bag 2" (彼女とスクールバッグ②, Kanojo to Sukūru Baggu 2); 402. "The First Time with My Girlfriend" (初めてと彼女①, Hajimete to Kanojo 1); 403. "The First Time with My Girlfriend 2" (初めてと彼女②, Hajimete to Kanojo 2); 404. "The First Time with My Girlfriend 3" (初めてと彼女③, Hajimete to Kanojo 3); 405. "The First Time with My Girlfriend 4" (初めてと彼女④, Hajimete to Kanojo 4); 406. "The First Time with My Girlfriend 5" (初めてと彼女⑤, Hajimete to Kanojo 5); 407. "The First Time with My Girlfriend 6" (初めてと彼女⑥, Hajimete to Kanojo 6); 408. "The Boyfriend and the Boyfriend" (彼と彼, Kare to Kare)
47	August 17, 2026	978-4-06-544630-0	TBA	—
409. "The Boyfriend and the Boyfriend 2" (彼と彼②, Kare to Kare 2); 410. "The Boyfriend and His Guilt 1" (罪悪感と彼①, Zaiakukan to Kare 1) (Note: This chapter was originally titled "The Boyfriend and His Pecs" in the English version.); 411. "The Boyfriend and His Guilt 2" (罪悪感と彼②, Zaiakukan to Kare 2); 412. "My Girlfriend and Her View of Love 1" (恋愛観と彼女①, Renaikan to Kanojo 1); 413. "My Girlfriend and Her View of Love 2" (恋愛観と彼女②, Renaikan to Kanojo 2); 414. "My Girlfriend and Her View of Love 3" (恋愛観と彼女③, Renaikan to Kanojo 3); 415. "My Girlfriend and the School Bag 3" (彼女とスクールバッグ③, Kanojo to Sukūru Baggu 3); 416. "My Girlfriend and the School Bag 4" (彼女とスクールバッグ④, Kanojo to Sukūru Baggu 4); 417. "My Ex, Nami Nanami 3" (「元カノ」、七海麻美③, "Moto Kano", Nanami Mami 3)
48	November 17, 2026	978-4-06-545720-7	TBA	—
418. "The Boyfriend and Love 1" (恋心と彼①, Koigokoro to Kare 1); 419. "The Boyfriend and Love 2" (恋心と彼②, Koigokoro to Kare 2); 420. "The Boyfriend and Love 3" (恋心と彼③, Koigokoro to Kare 3); 421. "The Boyfriend and Love 4" (恋心と彼④, Koigokoro to Kare 4); 422. "The Date and the Boyfriend 25" (デートと彼㉕, Dēto to Kare 25); 423. "The Date and the Boyfriend 26" (デートと彼㉖, Dēto to Kare 26); 424. "My Girlfriend and Passion" (情熱と彼女, Jōnetsu to Kanojo); 425. "The Cat and My Girlfriend 2" (猫と彼女②, Neko to Kanojo 2); 426. "My Girlfriend and the Impulse 2" (衝動と彼女②, Shōdō to Kanojo 2)

==== Chapters not yet published in volume format ====
These chapters have yet to be published in a tankōbon volume. They were originally serialized in Japanese in issues of Weekly Shōnen Magazine:

427. "My Girlfriend and Enemies in the Same Boat 1" (呉越同舟と彼女①, Goetsudōshū to Kanojo 1)
428. "My Girlfriend and Enemies in the Same Boat 2" (呉越同舟と彼女②, Goetsudōshū to Kanojo 2)
429. "My Girlfriend and Enemies in the Same Boat 3" (呉越同舟と彼女③, Goetsudōshū to Kanojo 3)
430. "My Girlfriend and Drawing the Line 3" (ケジメと彼女③, Kejime to Kanojo 3)
431. "The Boyfriend and Growth 1" (成長と彼①, Seichō to Kare 1)
432. "The Boyfriend and Growth 2" (成長と彼②, Seichō to Kare 2)
433. "The Boyfriend and Growth 3" (成長と彼③, Seichō to Kare 3)
434. "The Boyfriend and Growth 4" (成長と彼④, Seichō to Kare 4)
435. "The Boyfriend and the Love Confession" (告白と彼, Kokuhaku to Kare)
436. "My Girlfriend and Her Realization" (実感と彼女, Jikkan to Kanojo)
437. "The Boyfriend and His Final Exam" (卒業試験と彼, Sotsugyō Shiken to Kare)
438. "The Boyfriend and His Final Exam 2" (卒業試験と彼②, Sotsugyō Shiken to Kare 2)
439. "The Boyfriend and the Sheep" (羊と彼, Hitsuji to Kare)
440. "My Girlfriend and Her Pulse" (拍動と彼女, Hakudō to Kanojo)
441. "The Boyfriend and the Love Confession 2" (告白と彼②, Kokuhaku to Kare 2)
442. "The Boyfriend and the Love Confession 3" (告白と彼③, Kokuhaku to Kare 3)
443. "My Girlfriend and the Day Before" (前日と彼女, Zenjitsu to Kanojo)
444. "Ramen and My Girlfriend 1" (ラーメンと彼女①, Rāmen to Kanojo 1)
445. "Ramen and My Girlfriend 2" (ラーメンと彼女②, Rāmen to Kanojo 2)
446. "Ramen and My Girlfriend 3" (ラーメンと彼女③, Rāmen to Kanojo 3)
447. "Ramen and My Girlfriend 4" (ラーメンと彼女④, Rāmen to Kanojo 4)
448. "Ramen and My Girlfriend 5" (ラーメンと彼女⑤, Rāmen to Kanojo 5)
449. "Ramen and My Girlfriend 6" (ラーメンと彼女⑥, Rāmen to Kanojo 6)

=== Rent-A-(Really Shy!)-Girlfriend ===
No.	Original release date	Original ISBN	English release date	English ISBN
1	September 17, 2020	978-4-06-520602-7	November 9, 2021	978-1-64-651365-9 (print); 978-1-63-699580-9 (digital)
1. "Sumi and the Donuts" (墨とドーナツ, Sumi to Dōnatsu); 2. "Sumi and Her Job" (墨と仕事, Sumi to Shigoto); 3. "Sumi and Her Co-worker" (墨と先輩, Sumi to Senpai); 4. "Sumi and the Lost Item" (墨と落とし物, Sumi to Otoshimono); 5. "Sumi and Kaori" (墨と香織, Sumi to Kaori); 6. "Sumi and the Tears" (墨と涙, Sumi to Namida)
2	February 17, 2021	978-4-06-522069-6	January 11, 2022	978-1-64-651385-7 (print); 978-1-63-699679-0 (digital)
7. "Sumi and Kazuya-kun (1)" (墨とカズヤ君 ①, Sumi to Kazuya-kun 1); 8. "Sumi and Kazuya-kun (2)" (墨とカズヤ君 ②, Sumi to Kazuya-kun 2); 9. "Sumi and Kazuya-kun's Friend" (墨とカズヤ君のお友達, Sumi to Kazuya-kun no o Tomodachi); 10. "Sumi and the Revolving Sushi" (墨と回転寿司, Sumi to Kaiten Sushi); 11. "Sumi and the Photo Session" (墨と撮影, Sumi to Satsuei); 12. "Sumi and Her Dog Walk" (墨と犬の散歩, Sumi to Inunosanpo); 13. "Sumi and the Boyfriend" (墨と彼氏, Sumi to Kareshi)
3	May 17, 2022	978-4-06-525145-4	November 8, 2022	978-1-64-651410-6 (print); 978-1-68-491676-4 (digital)
14. "Sumi and the Boyfriend (2)" (墨と彼氏 ②, Sumi to Kareshi 2); 15. "Sumi and Ramen" (墨とラーメン, Sumi to Rāmen); 16. "Sumi and the Nail Salon" (墨とネイルサロン, Sumi to Neirusaron); 17. "Sumi and the Boyfriend (3)" (墨と彼氏 ③, Sumi to Kareshi 3); 18. "Sumi and Cure-Cure" (墨とキュアキュア, Sumi to Kyuakyua); 19. "Sumi and Cure-Cure (2)" (墨とキュアキュア ②, Sumi to Kyuakyua 2)
