= DMM.com =

Japan-based electronic commerce and Internet company

DMM.com LLC
- Type: Private Godo-gaisha
- Industry: Internet
- Founded: November 17, 1999; 26 years ago
- Founder: Keishi Kameyama
- Headquarters: 14F, Yebisu Garden Place Tower, 4-20-3 Ebisu, Shibuya-ku, Tokyo 150-6021, Japan
- Key people: Keishi Kameyama (Chairman); Takanori Katagiri (CEO)
- Services: Video on demand service, online shopping, e-books, online games, rental service, news, online English education service, 3D printing, mobile telephony, robots, PC software, solar panel services
- Revenue: DMM.com Ltd.: JP¥49.6 billion (2014); DMM Group: JP¥81.6 billion (2014)
- Operating income: DMM.com Ltd.: JP¥30 million; DMM Group: JP¥60 million
- Net income: JP¥3.48 billion (2014)
- Number of employees: DMM.com Ltd: 142 (2015); DMM Group: 1,186 (2015)
- Subsidiaries: DMM.com Labo Co., Ltd.; DMM.com Securities; KC Co., Ltd.; CA Co., Ltd.; GOT Corporation; TIS Co., Ltd.; DMM.com Override Co., Ltd.; Hobibox Co.Ltd; DMM Pictures; FANZA; Sint-Truidense
- Website: DMM.com

DMM.com LLC (合同会社DMM.com) is a Japan-based electronic commerce and Internet company with a diversified group of businesses that includes online shopping, eikaiwa, and video on demand service. The company manages DMM.com, an online entertainment site that allows users to purchase goods and services like e-books, games, mainstream DVD releases, and 3D printing. As of February 2024, DMM.com had over 45 million registered users.

== Outline ==
DMM.com's core business areas include online shopping, rental service and video on demand service. Rental services cover products from CD/DVD to clothes and house wares. Another key business of the company, video on demand service, offers a selection of anime, movies, drama and other online streaming options. Other services provided include solar panel services, charity auctions, online games, online English education service, and 3D printing. Its subsidiary company DMM.com Securities provides forex service to individual investors.

== Milestones ==
1999

- Keishi Kameyama founded Digital Media Mart Co., Ltd. on 17 November

2002

- Relocation of headquarter from Shibuya to Ebisu
- Launched of corporate website – “DMM” with provision of online shopping and video on demand service

2003

- Renamed the website as “DMM.com” and launched DVD rental service in April
- Established the site “DMM.com” for video on demand service, online games and e-books on 4 July

2004

- Started monthly subscription video streaming service and e-book service

2005

- Extended the products for rental service to CD and comic

2006

- Aired the first TV commercial
- The company reached 500,000 members in March

2007

- The company further grew over 1 million members in June

2008

- Released DMM.TV service in July

2009

- Debuted monthly subscription video streaming service for AKB48 LIVE!! ON DEMAND in February
- Acquired SVC Securities (Predecessor of DMM.com Securities) and entered the forex industry in March
- Established DMMFX in July
- DMM.TV for Blu-ray Disc service in August

2010

- Further extended the products for rental service to fashion and varieties of goods
- Launched DMM point auction service on 3 August
- Started DMM coupon service on 1 December

2011

- Renamed Digital Media Mart Co., Ltd. as DMM.com Co., Ltd. on 1 February
- Launched online game service for feature phone in November

2012

- Launched B2B solar panel business in February which also enable the construction of solar power station
- Launched online game service for smartphones and PCs in April
- Ended DMM.TV for Blu-ray Disc service on 28 September

2013

- Established online English education service in May
- Launched the printing centre in Japan and started 3D printing service in July

2014

- Launched VR video streaming service in November, a service which allows user to watch video with 360 degrees panorama
- Established DMM mobile, the MVNO service in December

2015

- Started DMM.make ROBOTS service in January
- Launched DMM.make cloud sourcing service in February

2016

- DMM Games entered a partnership with Gaijin Entertainment to assist in the localisation, development and production of War Thunder

2017

- Launched DMM Pictures, a label for producing anime.
- Became owner of Belgian First Division A football club Sint-Truiden.
- Launched the DMM Dream Club, a Hitokuchi Banushi group where members can invest and own a stock of a race horse.

2021

- Loves Only You, one of the horses owned by DMM Dream Club, wins the Breeders' Cup Filly & Mare Turf and Hong Kong Cup of that year before retiring to stud.

2023

- Launches CUE, an anime studio headed by Rui Kuroki.

2024

- Changed the video codec of DMM.TV to AV1 from H.264 in July

== DMM Games ==
- Kantai Collection
- Kanpani Girls
- Icchibanketsu
- Touken Ranbu
- Flower Knight Girl
- Millennium War Aigis
- Princess Wars
- Jewel Princess
- Kamihime Project
- Shiro Project:RE
- Bungo and Alchemist
- Soukou Musume
- School Servants!
- Girls Symphony
- Airi's Mistyria!
- Gemini Seed
- Tokyo Necro
- Kabaneri of the Iron Castle
- Namu Amida Butsu! Rendai Utena
- Fruits Fulcute!
- Alice Closet
- Ayakashi Rumble!
- Getariki Z
- Djibril – The Devil Angel
- Astel Machina of Hoshisai
- Stationflow
- Mist Train Girls
- Tenkei Paradox
- Monster Musume TD
- Legend Clover
- Magicami
- Otogi Frontier
- Dead or Alive Xtreme Venus Vacation
- Shuten Order
- Venus Vacation Prism: Dead or Alive Xtreme
- Touken Ranbu Pazugiri
