= Reiji Miyajima =

Japanese manga artist (born 1985)

Reiji Miyajima 宮島 礼吏
- Born: December 15, 1985 (age 40) Nakano, Nagano, Japan
- Area: Manga artist
- Notable works: AKB49: Ren'ai Kinshi Jōrei; Rent-A-Girlfriend; The Shiunji Family Children

Reiji Miyajima (Japanese: 宮島 礼吏, Hepburn: Miyajima Reiji; born December 15, 1985) is a Japanese manga artist. He is known for his series AKB49: Ren'ai Kinshi Jōrei, Rent-A-Girlfriend, and The Shiunji Family Children.

== Biography ==
Miyajima was born in Nakano, Nagano, on December 15, 1985. After graduating at a high school in Nakano, he began working as a manga artist in Tokyo. In October 2005, Miyajima received the Magazine Grand Prix Encouragement Award for his work Sakka no Tensai (サッカの天才). In the same year, he received an honorable mention at the 75th Weekly Shōnen Magazine Newcomer Manga Award for his one-shot manga Pool no Saboten. In 2008, he published his second one-shot manga Icon in Magazine Special.

Miyajima started in Weekly Shōnen Magazine by illustrating the short-term series Suzuki no Shiten in 2009. The following year, he illustrated the series AKB49: Ren'ai Kinshi Jōrei, which is based on the Japanese idol group AKB48. In 2017, Miyajima started the manga series Rent-A-Girlfriend, which has performed well in Japan. It has since received an anime adaptation and a spin-off manga. Miyajima has previously worked as an assistant for the manga series Ace of Diamond.

Aside from his manga career, Miyajima has also handled the series composition for the anime series 22/7. He also wrote the original story for its manga adaptation, 22/7 +α, which was serialized in Sunday Webry.

== Works ==
=== Manga ===
==== Serials ====
- Suzuki no Shiten (鈴木の視点) (2009, written by Shigemitsu Harada; serialized in Weekly Shōnen Magazine)
- AKB49: Ren'ai Kinshi Jōrei (AKB49〜恋愛禁止条例〜) (2010–2016, written by Motoazabu Factory; serialized in Weekly Shōnen Magazine)
- Mononote: Edo Shinobi Kagyō (もののて～江戸忍稼業～) (2016–2017, serialized in Weekly Shōnen Magazine)
- Rent-A-Girlfriend (彼女、お借りします, Kanojo, Okarishimasu) (2017–present, serialized in Weekly Shōnen Magazine)
- 22/7 +α (2020, illustrated by Nao Kasai; serialized in Sunday Webry)
- Rent-A-(Really Shy!)-Girlfriend (彼女、人見知ります, Kanojo, Hitomishirimasu) (2020–present, serialized in Magazine Pocket)
- The Shiunji Family Children (紫雲寺家の子供たち, Shiunji-ke no Kodomo-tachi) (2022–present, serialized in Young Animal)

==== One-shots ====
- Pool no Saboten (プールの仙人掌) (2005)
- Icon (アイコン) (2008, published in Magazine Special)
- Kanojo, Tensei Shimasu (彼女、転生します) (2020, published in Weekly Shōnen Magazine)

=== Television series ===
- 22/7 Keisanchū (22/7 計算中) (2018, character story draft)
- 22/7 (ナナブンノニジュウニ, Nanabun no Nijūni) (2020, series composition)

=== Video games ===
- Hissatsu Shigotonin: Oshioki Collection (必殺仕事人～お仕置きコレクション～) (2013, illustrations)
- 22/7: Ongaku no Jikan (22/7 音楽の時間) (2020, ChouChou character drafts)

=== Others ===
- AKB48 Bijutsukan (AKB48美術館) (2011, illustration of Not Yet; published in Magazine Special)
