= Macintosh Latin encoding =

Character encoding

Macintosh Latin
- Kermit: MACINTOSH-LATIN
- Created by: Kermit project
- Current status: Used by Kermit
- Based on: Mac OS Icelandic
- Transforms / Encodes: ISO/IEC 8859-1, DEC MCS, Eastern European font setup characters, Dutch ISO 646

Macintosh Latin is an obsolete character encoding which was used by Kermit (which as of 2022 supports Unicode UTF-8, though not UTF-16) to represent text on the Apple Macintosh (but not by standard Mac OS fonts). It is a modification of Mac OS Icelandic to include all characters in ISO/IEC 8859-1, DEC MCS, Eastern European font setup characters from the PostScript Standard Encoding, and a Dutch ISO 646 variant (Note: The proposal mentions a "Dutch ISO 646 variant" contributing the Florin sign (ƒ). There is no Florin sign in Code page 1019, so it appears to mean Code page 1102.) (with ÿ or ij being a substitute for ĳ). Although Macintosh Latin is designed to be compatible with the standard Macintosh Mac OS Roman encoding for the shared subset of characters, the two should not be confused.

== Layout ==
Each character is shown with its equivalent Unicode code point. Only the second half of the table (code points 128–255) is shown, the first half (code points 0–127) being the same as ASCII.

Macintosh Latin
	0	1	2	3	4	5	6	7	8	9	A	B	C	D	E	F
8x	Ä	Å	Ç	É	Ñ	Ö	Ü	á	à	â	ä	ã	å	ç	é	è
9x	ê	ë	í	ì	î	ï	ñ	ó	ò	ô	ö	õ	ú	ù	û	ü
Ax	Ý	°	¢	£	§	×	¶	ß	®	©	²	´	¨	³	Æ	Ø
Bx	¹	±	¼	½	¥	μ					¾	ª	º		æ	ø
Cx	¿	¡	¬	Ł	ƒ	ˋ		«	»	¦	NBSP	À	Ã	Õ	Œ	œ
Dx	SHY				ł		÷		ÿ	Ÿ		¤	Ð	ð	Þ	þ
Ex	ý	·				Â	Ê	Á	Ë	È	Í	Î	Ï	Ì	Ó	Ô
Fx		Ò	Ú	Û	Ù	ı	ˆ	˜	¯	˘	˙	˚	¸	˝	˛	ˇ

Different from Mac OS Roman, matching Mac OS Icelandic
Different from both Mac OS Icelandic and Mac OS Roman

== See also ==
- Macintosh Font X encoding, another Mac OS encoding used by Kermit
