= Interlinear annotation =

Interlinear annotation can mean:

- Ruby text
- Interlinear gloss
- Kanbun
