= Macintosh Font X encoding =

Type of character encoding

Macintosh Font X
- Created by: Kermit project
- Current status: Used by Kermit
- Based on: Mac OS Symbol
- Transforms / Encodes: DEC Special Graphics, DEC Technical Character Set

Macintosh Font X is a character encoding which is used by Kermit to represent text on the Apple Macintosh (but not by standard Mac OS fonts). It is a modification of Mac OS Symbol to include all characters in DEC Special Graphics and the DEC Technical Character Set (unifying the ⎷ and √ from the Technical Character Set).

Macintosh Font X
	0	1	2	3	4	5	6	7	8	9	A	B	C	D	E	F
0x	␀	␁	␂	␃	␄	␅	␆	␇	␈	␉	␊	␋	␌	␍	␎	␏
1x	␐	␑	␒	␓	␔	␕	␖	␗	␘	␙	␚	␛	␜	␝	␞	␟
2x	SP	!	£	#	$	%	&	⎻	(	)	*	+	,	−	.	/
3x	0	1	2	3	4	5	6	7	8	9	:	;	<	=	>	?
4x	@	A	B	C	D	E	F	G	H	I	J	K	L	M	N	O
5x	P	Q	R	S	T	U	V	W	X	Y	Z	[	∴	]	┴	⎽
6x	⎺	α	β	χ	δ	ε	φ	γ	η	ι	┬	κ	λ	┼	ν	Ω
7x	π	θ	ρ	σ	τ	υ	Δ	ω	ξ	ψ	ζ	┤	Φ	├	∼	␡
8x																
9x																
Ax		Υ	'	≤	╲	∞	ƒ	╱	♦	⌟	Γ	Λ	←		→	↓
Bx	°	±	"	≥	×	∝	∂		÷	≠	≡	≃	⎼	│	─	␤
Cx					Θ			∩	∪	⊃			⊂			
Dx	⎳	∇		Ξ	Ψ	Π	√	⋅	¬	∧	∨	⇔		↑	⇒	
Ex	▒	⎲				Σ	⎛		⎝	┌	\	└	⎡	⎨	⎣	
Fx		⟩	∫	⌠		⌡	⎞		⎠	┐		┘	⎤	⎬	⎦	

Characters at A4, A7, A9, D0, E1, and F1, along with the not sign at D8 are intended to assemble a 3x5 uppercase sigma.

== See also ==
Macintosh Latin encoding, another Mac OS encoding used by Kermit.
