= Old High German =

Earliest stage of the German language

- diutisk
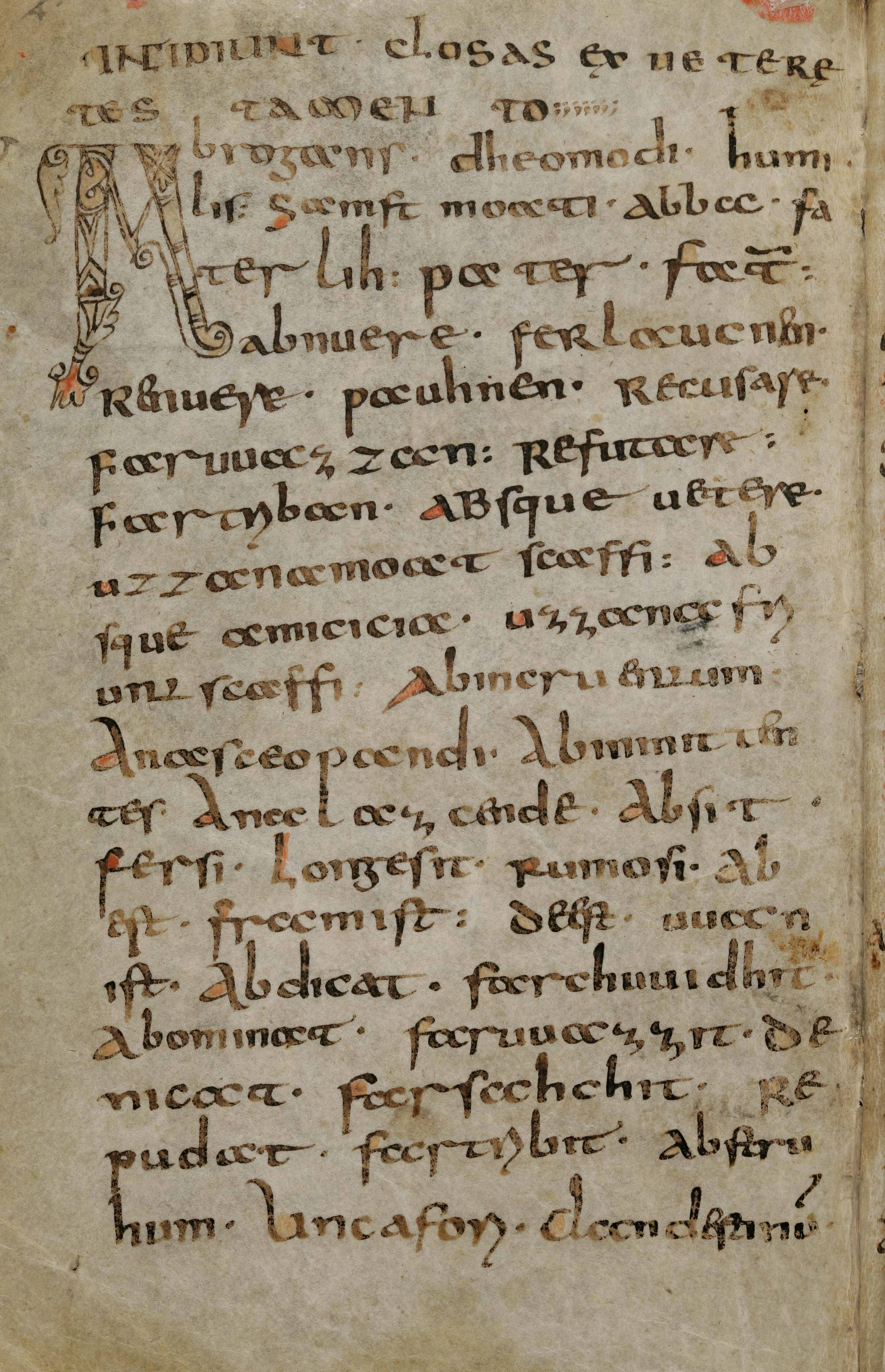
- First page of the St. Gall Codex Abrogans (Stiftsbibliothek, cod. 911), one of the earliest texts in Old High German
- Region: Central Europe
- Era: Early Middle Ages (c. AD 500–1050)
- Language family: Indo-European: Germanic; West Germanic; Old High German
- Early form: Proto-West Germanic
- Writing system: Runic, Latin

Language codes
- ISO 639-2: goh
- ISO 639-3: goh
- Glottolog: oldh1241

Old High German (OHG; German: Althochdeutsch (Ahdt., Ahd.)) is the earliest stage of the German language, conventionally identified as the period from around 500/750 to 1050. Rather than representing a single supra-regional form of German, Old High German encompasses the numerous West Germanic dialects that had undergone the set of consonantal changes called the Second Sound Shift.

At the start of this period, dialect areas reflected the territories of largely independent tribal kingdoms, but by 788 the conquests of Charlemagne had brought all OHG dialect areas into a single polity. The period also saw the development of a stable linguistic border between German and Gallo-Romance, later French.

Old High German largely preserved the synthetic inflectional system inherited from its ancestral Germanic forms. The eventual disruption of these patterns, which led to the more analytic grammar, are generally considered to mark the transition to Middle High German.

Surviving Old High German texts were all composed in monastic scriptoria, so the overwhelming majority of them are religious in nature or, when secular, belong to the Latinate literary culture of Christianity. The earliest instances, which date to the latter half of the 8th century, are glosses—notes added to the margins or between lines that provide translation of the (Latin) text or other aid to the reader.

== Periodisation ==
Old High German is generally dated from around 750 to around 1050. The beginning of this period marks the emergence of the Old High German (OHG) written tradition initially limited to glosses, but by the 9th century, it included substantial translations and original compositions. However, the fact that the defining feature of Old High German, the Second Sound Shift (generally called the High German Consonant Shift in English), may have started as early as the 6th century and is complete by 750, means that some take the 6th century to be the start of the period. (Note: for example (Hutterer 1999, p. 307)) Alternatively, terms such as Voralthochdeutsch ("pre-OHG") or vorliterarisches Althochdeutsch ("pre-literary OHG") are sometimes used for the period before 750. (Note: with tables showing the position taken in most of the standard works before 2000. (Roelcke 1998)) Regardless of terminology, all recognize a distinction between a pre-literary period and the start of a continuous tradition of written texts around the middle of the 8th century.

The end of the period is less controversial. The sound changes reflected in spelling during the 11th century led to the remodelling of the entire system of noun and adjective declensions. There is also a hundred-year "dearth of continuous texts" after the death of Notker Labeo in 1022. The mid-11th century is widely accepted as marking the transition to Middle High German.

== Territory ==
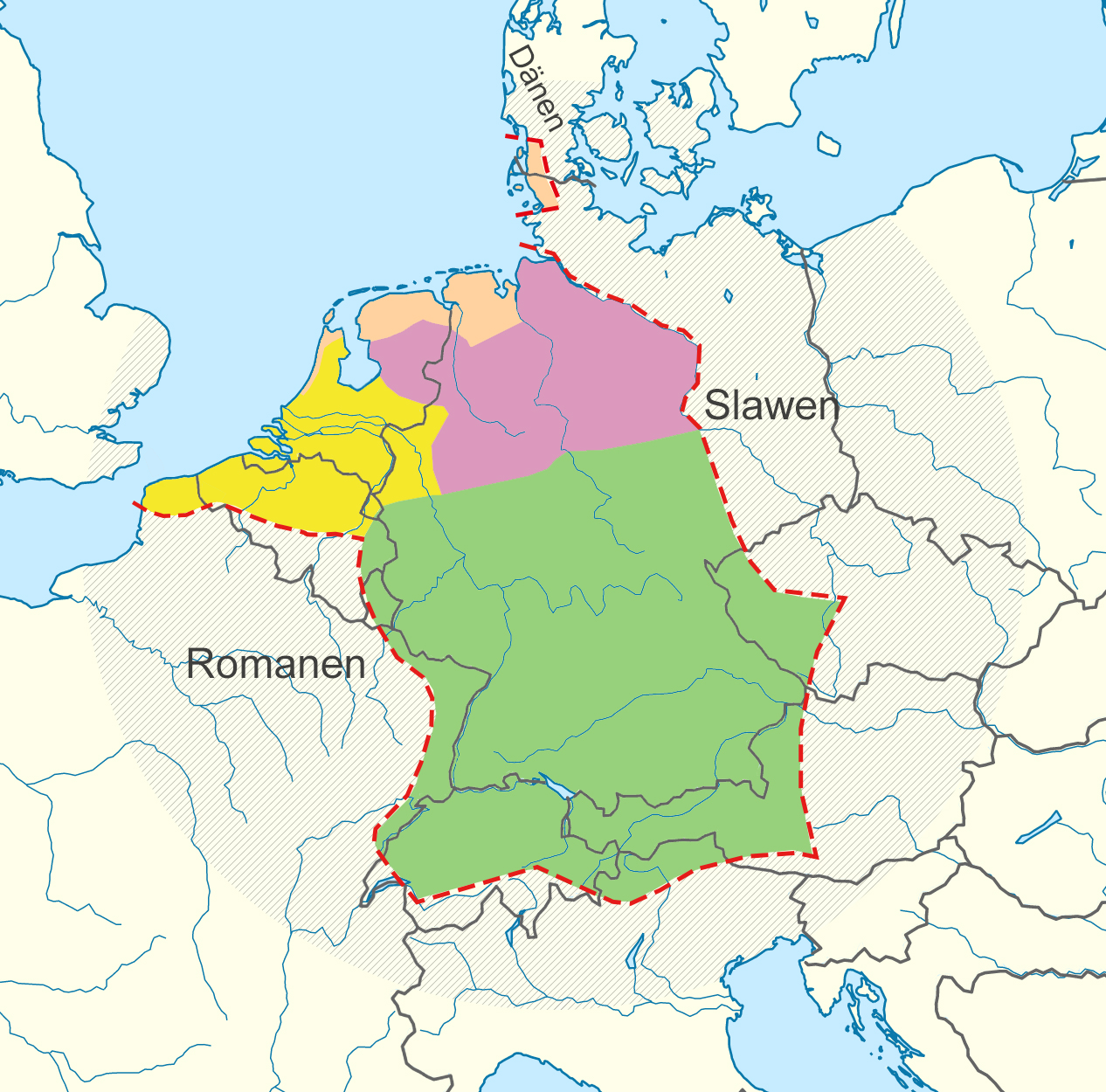
The Old High German–speaking area (in green) during the Early Medieval Period

Old High German encompasses the dialects that had undergone the Second Sound Shift during the 6th century—namely all of the Upper and Central German dialects.

The Franks in the western part of Francia (Neustria and western Austrasia) gradually adopted Gallo-Romance by the beginning of the OHG period, with the linguistic boundary later stabilised approximately along the course of the Meuse and Moselle in the east, and the northern boundary probably a little further south than the current boundary between French and Dutch. North of this line, the Franks retained their language, but it was not affected by the Second Sound Shift, which thus separated the Low Franconian or Old Dutch varieties from the more easterly Franconian dialects which formed part of Old High German.

In the south, the Lombards, who had settled in Northern Italy, maintained their dialect until their conquest by Charlemagne in 774. After this the Germanic-speaking population, who were by then almost certainly bilingual, gradually switched to the Romance language of the native population, so that Langobardic had died out by the end of the OHG period.

At the beginning of the period, no Germanic language was spoken east of a line from Kieler Förde to the rivers Elbe and Saale, earlier Germanic speakers in the Northern part of the area having been displaced by the Slavs. This area did not become German-speaking until the German eastward expansion ("Ostkolonisation", "Ostsiedlung") of the early 12th century, though there was some attempt at conquest and missionary work under the Ottonians.

The Alemannic polity was conquered by Clovis I in 496, and in the last twenty years of the 8th century Charlemagne subdued the Saxons, the Frisians, the Bavarians, and the Lombards, bringing all continental Germanic-speaking peoples under Frankish rule. While this led to some degree of Frankish linguistic influence, the language of both the administration and the Church was Latin, and this unification did not therefore lead to any development of a supra-regional variety of Frankish nor a standardized Old High German; the individual dialects retained their identity.

== Dialects ==
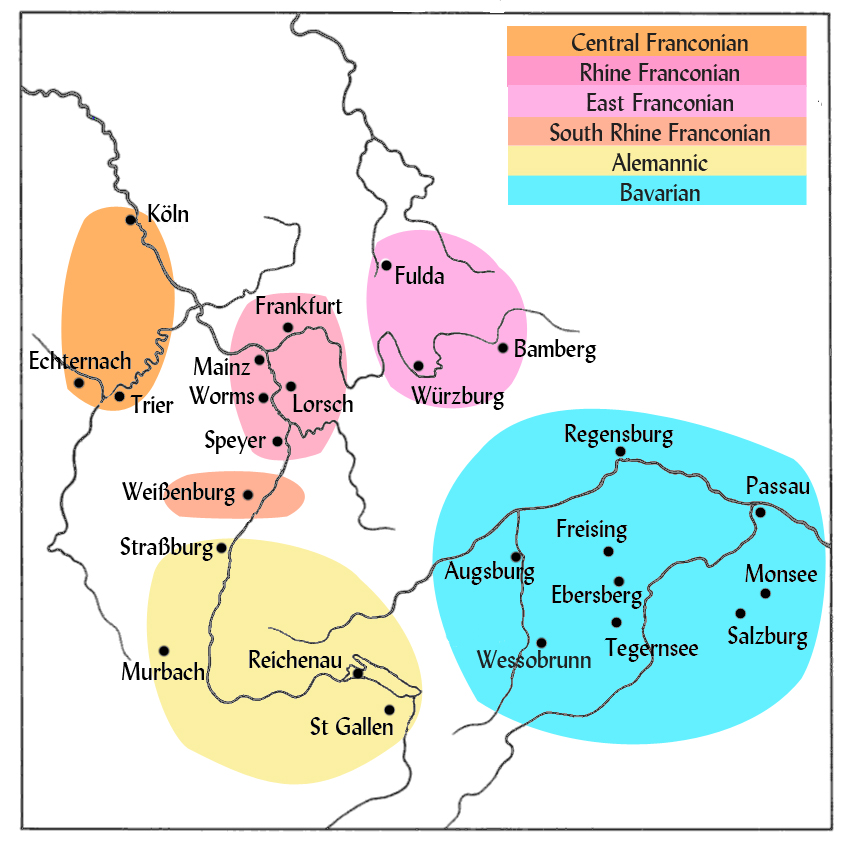
Map showing the main Old High German scriptoria and the areas of the Old High German "monastery dialects"

There was no standard or supra-regional variety of Old High German—every text is written in a particular dialect, or in some cases a mixture of dialects. Broadly speaking, the main dialect divisions of Old High German seem to have been similar to those of later periods—they are based on established territorial groupings and the effects of the Second Sound Shift, which have remained influential until the present day. But because the direct evidence for Old High German consists solely of manuscripts produced in a few major ecclesiastical centres, there is no isogloss information of the sort on which modern dialect maps are based. For this reason the dialects may be termed "monastery dialects" (German Klosterdialekte).

The main dialects, with their bishoprics and monasteries:

- Central German (referred to as "Franconian" by some authors)
  - Middle Franconian: Trier, Echternach, Cologne
  - Rhine Franconian: Lorsch, Speyer, Worms, Mainz, Frankfurt
  - South Rhine Franconian: Wissembourg
- Upper German
  - Alemannic: Murbach, Reichenau, Sankt Gallen, Strasbourg
  - Bavarian: Freising, Passau, Regensburg, Augsburg, Ebersberg, Wessobrunn, Benediktbeuern, Tegernsee, Salzburg, Mondsee
- Transitional between Central and Upper German:
  - East Franconian: Fulda, Bamberg, Würzburg

In addition, there are two poorly attested dialects:

- Thuringian, a Central German dialect, is attested only in four runic inscriptions and some possible glosses.
- Langobardic was the dialect of the Lombards who invaded Northern Italy in the 6th century, and little evidence of it remains apart from names and individual words in Latin texts, and a few runic inscriptions. It declined after the conquest of the Lombard Kingdom by the Franks in 774. It is classified as Upper German on the basis of evidence of the Second Sound Shift. Some scholars exclude Langobardic from Old High German because of its poor state of preservation.

The continued existence of a West Frankish dialect in the Western, Romanized part of Francia is uncertain. Claims that this might have been the language of the Carolingian court or that it is attested in the Ludwigslied, whose presence in a French manuscript suggests bilingualism, are controversial.

== Literacy ==
Old High German literacy is a product of the monasteries, notably at St. Gallen, Reichenau Island and Fulda. Its origins lie in the establishment of the German church by Saint Boniface in the mid-8th century, and it was further encouraged during the Carolingian Renaissance in the 9th. The dedication to the preservation of Old High German epic poetry among the scholars of the Carolingian Renaissance was significantly greater than could be suspected from the meagre survivals we have today (less than 200 lines in total between the Hildebrandslied and the Muspilli). Einhard tells how Charlemagne himself ordered that the epic lays should be collected for posterity. It was the neglect or religious zeal of later generations that led to the loss of these records. Thus, it was Charlemagne's weak successor, Louis the Pious, who destroyed his father's collection of epic poetry on account of its pagan content.

Rabanus Maurus, a student of Alcuin and later an abbot at Fulda, was an important advocate of the cultivation of German literacy. Among his students were Walafrid Strabo and Otfrid of Weissenburg.

Towards the end of the Old High German period, Notker Labeo was among the greatest stylists in the language, and developed a systematic orthography.

== Writing system ==
Old High German marked the culmination of a shift away from runic writing of the pre-OHG period to the Latin alphabet. This shift led to considerable variations in spelling conventions, as individual scribes and scriptoria had to develop their own transliteration of sounds not native to Latin script. Otfrid von Weissenburg, in one of the prefaces to his Evangelienbuch, offers comments on and examples of some of the issues which arise in adapting the Latin alphabet for German: "...sic etiam in multis dictis scriptio est propter litterarum aut congeriem aut incognitam sonoritatem difficilis." ("...so also, in many expressions, spelling is difficult because of the piling up of letters or their unfamiliar sound.") The careful orthographies of the OHG Isidor or Notker show a similar awareness.

== Phonology ==
Second Merseburg Charm
Example of Old High German: Second Merseburg Charm

The charts show the vowel and consonant systems of the East Franconian dialect in the 9th century. This is the dialect of the monastery of Fulda, and specifically of the Old High German Tatian. Dictionaries and grammars of OHG often use the spellings of the Tatian as a substitute for genuine standardised spellings, and these have the advantage of being recognizably close to the Middle High German forms of words, particularly with respect to the consonants.

=== Vowels ===
Old High German had six phonemic short vowels and five phonemic long vowels. Both occurred in stressed and unstressed syllables. In addition, there were six diphthongs.

	Front		Back^{1}	
	Short^{2}	Long^{3}	Short^{2}	Long^{3}
Close	i	iː	u	uː
Mid	e	eː	o	oː
Open	(ɛ)^{4}		a	aː
	Diphthongs^{5}			
	ie̯		uo̯	
	iu̯		io̯	
	ei̯		ou̯	

Notes:

^{1} All back vowels likely had front-vowel allophones as a result of umlaut. The front-vowel allophones likely became full phonemes in Middle High German.
^{2} The short close and mid vowels may have been articulated lower than their long counterparts as in Modern German. This cannot be established from written sources.
^{3} Vowel length was indicated in the manuscripts inconsistently (though modern handbooks are consistent). Vowel letter doubling, a circumflex, or an acute accent was generally used to indicate a long vowel.
^{4} In the Old High German period, there existed [e] (possibly a close-mid vowel) from the umlaut of /a/ and the inherited [ɛ]. The former probably was not phonemicized until the end of the period. Manuscripts occasionally distinguish two /e/ sounds. Generally, modern grammars and dictionaries use ⟨ë⟩ for the open-mid vowel /ɛ/ and ⟨e⟩ for the close-mid vowel /e/.
^{5} On the diphthongs' origins:

1. OHG ⟨ie⟩ came from PWGmc *ē. It passed from *ē to ⟨ea⟩ to ⟨ia⟩ to ⟨ie⟩.
  1. *hēr > hia(r)
2. OHG ⟨iu⟩ came from PWGmc *iu. This OHG diphthong /iu̯/ was one of the sources for the Middle High German monophthong /yː/.
  1. *þiudisk > diutisk
3. OHG ⟨ei⟩ came from PWGmc *ai. PWGmc *ai monophthongized to OHG ⟨ê⟩ before certain consonants: /w/, /r/, and /x/ from PWGmc *h.
  1. *stain > stein
  2. *raihō > rēho
4. OHG ⟨uo⟩ came from PWGmc *ō. It passed from *ō to ⟨oa⟩ to ⟨ua⟩ to ⟨uo⟩.
  1. *mōd > muot
5. OHG ⟨io⟩ came from PWGmc *eu. It passed from *eu to ⟨eo⟩ to ⟨io⟩.
  1. *leuþ > liod
6. OHG ⟨ou⟩ came from PWGmc *au. PWGmc *au monophthongized to OHG ⟨ô⟩ before certain consonants: /d/, /t/, /s/, /s̠/, /l/, /n/, /r/, and /x/ from PWGmc *h.
  1. *baum > boum
  2. *dauþu > tōd

==== Reduction of unstressed vowels ====
By the mid 11th century the many different vowels found in unstressed syllables had almost all been reduced to ⟨e⟩ [ə].

Examples:

Old High German	Middle High German	New High German	English
mahhōn	machen	machen	to make, do
taga	tage	Tage	days
dëmu	dëm(e)	dem	to the (masc./neut.)

=== Consonants ===
The main difference between Old High German and the West Germanic dialects from which it developed is that the former underwent the Second Sound Shift. The result of the sound change has been that the consonantal system of German is different from all other West Germanic languages, including English and Low German. The shift applied to different extents onto various dialects, added to other interdialectal variations, this makes a single "High German" system and precise articulations details thereabout difficult to reconstruct.

		Labial	Dental	Alveolar	Dorsal	Glottal
Plosive^{6}	Lenis	b	d		ɡ	
Plosive^{6}	Fortis	p		t	/k/ ⟨c, k⟩	
Affricate	Fortis	/p͡f/ ⟨ph, pf⟩	/θ/ ⟨th⟩^{7}	/t͡s/ ⟨tz, z⟩	(/k͡x/ ⟨ch⟩)^{8}	
Fricative^{6}	Fortis	f	/θ/ ⟨th⟩^{7}	/s/ ⟨ȥ⟩^{9}	/x/^{10} ⟨ch, h⟩	
Fricative^{6}	Lenis	v		⟨s⟩ /s̠/^{11}		h
Sonorant	Modal	/w/ ⟨w, uu⟩		r	/j/ ⟨j, i⟩	
Sonorant	Lateral			l		
Sonorant	Nasal	m		n	[ŋ] ⟨ng⟩	

Notes:

^{6} Obstruents appeared in fortis/lenis pairs. The realisation of this contrast probably varied across dialect.
^{7} /θ/ changes to /d/ in all dialects during the 9th century. The status in the Old High German Tatian (c. 830), as is reflected in modern Old High German dictionaries and glossaries, is that ⟨th⟩ is found in initial position and ⟨d⟩ in other positions.
^{8} /k͡x/ was confined to Upper Alemanic and Bavarian varieties.
^{9} A curly-tailed z ⟨ȥ⟩ is sometimes used in modern grammars and dictionaries to indicate the alveolar fricative that arose from Common Germanic t in the High German consonant shift. That distinguishes it from the alveolar affricate, which represented as z. The distinction has no counterpart in the original manuscripts, except in the Old High German Isidor, which uses tz for the affricate.
^{10} It is not clear whether Old High German /x/ had acquired a palatalized allophone [ç] after front vowels, as is the case in Modern German.
^{11} The original Germanic fricative s was in writing usually clearly distinguished from the younger fricative z that evolved from the High German consonant shift. The sounds of both letters seem not to have merged before the 13th century. Since s later came to be pronounced /ʃ/ before other consonants (as in Stein /ʃtaɪn/, Speer /ʃpeːɐ/, Schmerz /ʃmɛrts/ (original smerz) or the southwestern pronunciation of words like Ast /aʃt/), it seems safe to assume that the actual pronunciation of Germanic s was somewhere between [s] and [ʃ], most likely about [s̠], in all Old High German until late Middle High German. A word like swaz gloss, would thus never have been [swas] but rather [s̠was], later (13th century) [ʃwas], [ʃvas].

Old High German distinguished long and short consonants. Double-consonant spellings indicate not a preceding short vowel, as they do in Modern German, but true consonant gemination. Double consonants found in Old High German include pp, bb, tt, dd, ck (for /kː/), gg, ff, ss, zz, hh, mm, nn, ll, rr.

=== Phonological developments ===
This list has the sound changes that transformed Common West Germanic into Old High German but not the Late OHG changes that affected Middle High German:

- /ɣ/, /β/ > /ɡ/, /b/ in all positions (/ð/ > /d/ already took place in West Germanic. Most but not all High German areas are subject to the change.
  - PwGmc *sibi > OHG sib (cf. Old English: sife [ˈsive]), PwGmc *gesteran > OHG gestaron (cf. Dutch: gisteren [ˈɣɪstərə(n)])
- High German consonant shift: Inherited voiceless plosives are lenited into fricatives and affricates, and voiced fricatives are hardened into plosives and in some cases devoiced.
  - Ungeminated post-vocalic /p/, /t/, /k/ spirantize intervocalically to /ff/, /ss/, /xx/ and elsewhere to /f/, /s/, /x/. Cluster /tr/ is exempt. Compare OE slǣpan to OHG slāfan.
  - Word-initially, after a resonant and when geminated, the same consonants affricatized to /pf/, /ts/ and /kx/, OE tam: OHG zam.
    - Spread of /k/ > /k͡x/ is geographically very limited and is not reflected in Modern Standard German.
  - /b/, /d/ and /ɡ/ are devoiced.
    - In what ultimately gave rise to Standard German, this applies to /d/ in all positions but to /b/ and /ɡ/ only when they are geminated. PwGmc *bruggju > brucca > Brücke, but *leugan > liogan > lügen.
- *ē_{2} and *ō are diphthongized into /ie/ and /uo/, respectively.
- Proto-Germanic *ai became ei except before /r/, /h/, /w/ and word-finally, when it monophthongizes into ē, which is also the reflex of unstressed *ai.
  - Similarly, *au > ō before /r/, /h/ and all dentals; otherwise, *au > ou. PwGmc *dauþu > OHG tōd, but *haubud > houbit.
    - /h/ refers there only to inherited /h/ from PIE *k, not to the result of the consonant shift /x/, which is sometimes written as ⟨h⟩.
- /eu/ merges with /iu/ under i-umlaut and u-umlaut but elsewhere is /io/ (earlier /eo/). In Upper German varieties, it also becomes /iu/ before labials and velars.
- /θ/ fortifies to /d/ in all German dialects.
- Initial /w/ and /h/ before another consonant are dropped.

== Morphology ==
=== Verbs ===
==== Tense ====
Germanic had a simple two-tense system, with forms for a present and preterite. These were inherited by Old High German, but in addition OHG developed three periphrastic tenses: the perfect, pluperfect and future.

The periphrastic past tenses were formed by combining the present or preterite of an auxiliary verb (wësan, habēn) with the past participle. Initially the past participle retained its original function as an adjective and showed case and gender endings—for intransitive verbs the nominative, for transitive verbs the accusative. For example:

After thie thö argangana warun ahtu taga (Tatian, 7,1)
"When eight days had passed", literally "After that then gone-by were eight days"
Latin: Et postquam consummati sunt dies octo (Luke 2:21)

phīgboum habeta sum giflanzotan (Tatian 102,2)
"There was a fig tree that some man had planted", literally "Fig-tree had certain (or someone) planted"
Latin: arborem fici habebat quidam plantatam (Luke 13:6)

In time, however, these endings fell out of use and the participle came to be seen no longer as an adjective but as part of the verb, as in Modern German. This development is taken to be arising from a need to render Medieval Latin forms, but parallels in other Germanic languages (particularly Gothic, where the Biblical texts were translated from Greek, not Latin) raise the possibility that it was an independent development.

Germanic also had no future tense, but again OHG created periphrastic forms, using an auxiliary verb skulan (Modern German sollen) and the infinitive, or werden and the present participle:

Thu scalt beran einan alawaltenden (Otfrid's Evangelienbuch I, 5,23)
"You shall bear an almighty one"
Inti nu uuirdist thu suigenti' (Tatian 2,9)
"And now you will start to fall silent"
Latin: Et ecce eris tacens (Luke 1:20)

The present tense continued to be used alongside these new forms to indicate future time (as it still is in Modern German).

==== Conjugation ====
The following is a sample conjugation of a strong verb, nëman "to take".

nëman
		Indicative	Subjunctive	Imperative
Present	1st sg	nimu	nëme	—
Present	2nd sg	nimis (-ist)	nëmēs (-ēst)	nim
Present	3rd sg	nimit	nëme	—
Present	1st pl	nëmemēs (-ēn)	nëmemēs (-ēn)	nëmamēs, -emēs (-ēn)
Present	2nd pl	nëmet	nëmēt	nëmet
Present	3rd pl	nëmant	nëmēn	—
Past	1st sg	nam	nāmi	—
Past	2nd sg	nāmi	nāmīs (-īst)	—
Past	3rd sg	nam	nāmi	—
Past	1st pl	nāmumēs (-un)	nāmīmēs (-īn)	—
Past	2nd pl	nāmut	nāmīt	—
Past	3rd pl	nāmun	nāmīn	—
Gerund	Genitive	nëmannes		
Gerund	Dative	nëmanne		
Participle	Present	nëmanti (-enti)		
Participle	Past	ginoman		

=== Personal pronouns ===
Number	Person	Gender	Nominative	Genitive	Dative	Accusative
Singular	1.		ih	mīn	mir	mih
Singular	2.		dū	dīn	dir	dih
Singular	3.	Masculine	(h)er	(sīn)	imu, imo	inan, in
Singular	3.	Feminine	siu; sī, si	ira, iru	iro	sia
Singular	3.	Neuter	iz	es, is	imu, imo	iz
Plural	1.		wir	unsēr	uns	unsih
Plural	2.		ir	iuwēr	iu	iuwih
Plural	3.	Masculine	sie	iro	im, in	sie
Plural	3.	Feminine	sio	iro	im, in	sio
Plural	3.	Neuter	siu	iro	im, in	siu

== Syntax ==
Any description of OHG syntax faces a fundamental problem: texts translated from or based on a Latin original will be syntactically influenced by their source, while the verse works may show patterns that are determined by the needs of rhyme and metre, or that represent literary archaisms. Nonetheless, the basic word order rules are broadly those of Modern Standard German.

Two differences from the modern language are the possibility of omitting a subject pronoun and lack of definite and indefinite articles. Both features are exemplified in the start of the 8th century Alemannic creed from St Gall: kilaubu in got vater almahticun (Modern German, Ich glaube an Gott den allmächtigen Vater; English "I believe in God the almighty father").

By the end of the OHG period, however, use of a subject pronoun has become obligatory, while the definite article has developed from the original demonstrative pronoun (der, diu, daz) and the numeral ein ("one") has come into use as an indefinite article. These developments are generally seen as mechanisms to compensate for the loss of morphological distinctions which resulted from the weakening of unstressed vowels in the endings of nouns and verbs (see above). (Note: who discusses the problems with this view. (Salmons 2012, p. 162)) (Note: "but more indirectly that previously assumed." (Fleischer & Schallert 2011, pp. 206–211))

== Texts ==
The early part of the period saw considerable missionary activity, and by 800 the whole of the Frankish Empire had, in principle, been Christianized. All the manuscripts which contain Old High German texts were written in ecclesiastical scriptoria by scribes whose main task was writing in Latin rather than German. Consequently, the majority of Old High German texts are religious in nature and show strong influence of ecclesiastical Latin on the vocabulary. In fact, most surviving prose texts are translations of Latin originals. Even secular works such as the Hildebrandslied are often preserved only because they were written on spare sheets in religious codices.

The earliest Old High German text is generally taken to be the Abrogans, a Latin–Old High German glossary variously dated between 750 and 780, probably from Reichenau. The 8th century Merseburg Incantations are the only remnant of pre-Christian German literature. The earliest texts not dependent on Latin originals would seem to be the Hildebrandslied and the Wessobrunn Prayer, both recorded in manuscripts of the early 9th century, though the texts are assumed to derive from earlier copies.

The Bavarian Muspilli is the sole survivor of what must have been a vast oral tradition. Other important works are the Evangelienbuch (Gospel harmony) of Otfrid von Weissenburg, the Ludwigslied and the 9th century Georgslied. The boundary to Early Middle High German (from c. 1050) is not clear-cut.

An example of Early Middle High German literature is the Annolied.

== Example texts ==
The Lord's Prayer is given in four Old High German dialects below. Because these are translations of a liturgical text, they are best not regarded as examples of idiomatic language, but they do show dialect variation very clearly.

Lord's Prayer
Latin version (From Tatian)	Alemannic, 8th century The St Gall Paternoster	South Rhine Franconian, 9th century Weissenburg Catechism	East Franconian, c. 830 Old High German Tatian	Bavarian, early 9th century Freisinger Paternoster
Pater noster, qui in caelis es, sanctificetur nomen tuum, adveniat regnum tuum, fiat voluntas tua, sicut in caelo, et in terra, panem nostrum cotidianum da nobis hodie, et dimitte nobis debita nostra, sicut et nos dimittimus debitoribus nostris, et ne inducas nos in temptationem, sed libera nos a malo.	Fater unseer, thu pist in himile, uuihi namun dinan, qhueme rihhi di^{i}n, uuerde uuillo di^{i}n, so in himile sosa in erdu. prooth unseer emezzihic kip uns hiutu, oblaz uns sculdi unsero, so uuir oblazem uns skuldikem, enti ni unsih firleiti in khorunka, uzzer losi unsih fona ubile.	Fater unsēr, thu in himilom bist, giuuīhit sī namo thīn. quaeme rīchi thīn. uuerdhe uuilleo thīn, sama sō in himile endi in erthu. Brooth unseraz emezzīgaz gib uns hiutu. endi farlāz uns sculdhi unsero, sama sō uuir farlāzzēm scolōm unserēm. endi ni gileidi unsih in costunga. auh arlōsi unsih fona ubile.	Fater unser, thū thār bist in himile, sī geheilagōt thīn namo, queme thīn rīhhi, sī thīn uuillo, sō her in himile ist, sō sī her in erdu, unsar brōt tagalīhhaz gib uns hiutu, inti furlāz uns unsara sculdi sō uuir furlāzemēs unsarēn sculdīgōn, inti ni gileitēst unsih in costunga, ūzouh arlōsi unsih fon ubile.	Fater unser, du pist in himilum. Kauuihit si namo din. Piqhueme rihhi din, Uuesa din uuillo, sama so in himile est, sama in erdu. Pilipi unsraz emizzigaz kip uns eogauuanna. Enti flaz uns unsro sculdi, sama so uuir flazzames unsrem scolom. Enti ni princ unsih in chorunka. Uzzan kaneri unsih fona allem sunton.

== See also ==
- Old High German literature
- Middle High German
- Old High German declension

== Sources ==
- Althaus, Hans Peter; Henne, Helmut; Weigand, Herbert Ernst, eds. (1980). Lexikon der Germanistischen Linguistik (in German) (2nd rev. ed.). Tübingen: Niemeyer. ISBN 3-484-10396-5.
- Bostock, J. Knight (1976). King, K. C.; McLintock, D. R. (eds.). A Handbook on Old High German Literature (2nd ed.). Oxford: Clarendon Press. ISBN 0-19-815392-9.
- Braune, W.; Helm, K.; Ebbinghaus, E. A., eds. (1994). Althochdeutsches Lesebuch (in German) (17th ed.). Tübingen: M. Niemeyer. ISBN 3-484-10707-3.
- Fleischer, Jürg; Schallert, Oliver (2011). Historische Syntax des Deutschen: eine Einführung (in German). Tübingen: Narr. ISBN 978-3-8233-6568-6.
- Hutterer, Claus Jürgen (1999). Die germanischen Sprachen. Ihre Geschichte in Grundzügen (in German). Wiesbaden: Albus. pp. 336–341. ISBN 3-928127-57-8.
- Keller, Rudolf Ernst (1978). The German Language. London: Faber & Faber. ISBN 0-571-11159-9.
- Kuroda, Susumu (1999). Die historische Entwicklung der Perfektkonstruktionen im Deutschen (in German). Hamburg: Helmut Buske. ISBN 3-87548-189-5.
- Marchand, James (1992). "OHTFRID'S LETTER TO LIUDBERT". The Saint Pachomius Library.
- Meineke, Eckhard; Schwerdt, Judith (2001). Einführung in das Althochdeutsche. UTB 2167 (in German). Paderborn: Schöningh. ISBN 3-8252-2167-9.
- Morris RL (1991). "The Rise of Periphrastic Tenses in German: The Case Against Latin Influence". In Antonsen EH, Hock HH (eds.). Stæfcraft. Studies in Germanic Linguistics. Amsterdam, Philadelphia: John Benjamins. ISBN 90-272-3576-7.
- Moser, Hans; Wellmann, Hans; Wolf, Norbert Richard (1981). Geschichte der deutschen Sprache. 1: Althochdeutsch — Mittelhochdeutsch (in German). Heidelberg: Quelle & Meyer. ISBN 3-494-02133-3.
- Parra Membrives, Eva (2002). Literatura medieval alemana (in Spanish). Madrid: Síntesis. ISBN 978-847738997-2.
- Penzl, Herbert (1971). Lautsystem und Lautwandel in den althochdeutschen Dialekten (in German). Munich: Hueber.
- Penzl, Herbert (1986). Althochdeutsch: Eine Einführung in Dialekte und Vorgeschichte (in German). Bern: Peter Lang. ISBN 3-261-04058-0.
- Peters R (1985). "Soziokulturelle Voraussetzungen und Sprachraum des Mittleniederdeutschen". In Besch W, Reichmann O, Sonderegger S (eds.). Sprachgeschichte. Ein Handbuch zur Geschichte der deutschen Sprache und ihrer Erforschung (in German). Vol. 2. Berlin, New York: Walter De Gruyter. pp. 1211–1220. ISBN 3-11-009590-4.
- von Raumer, Rudolf (1851). Einwirkung des Christenthums auf die Althochdeutsche Sprache (in German). Berlin: S.G.Liesching.
- Roelcke T (1998). "Die Periodisierung der deutschen Sprachgeschichte". In Besch W, Betten A, Reichmann O, Sonderegger S (eds.). Sprachgeschichte (in German). Vol. 2 (2nd ed.). Berlin, New York: Walter De Gruyter. pp. 798–815. ISBN 3-11-011257-4.
- Salmons, Joseph (2012). A History of German. Oxford University. ISBN 978-0-19-969794-6.
- Scherer, Wilhelm (1878). Zur Geschichte der deutschen Sprache (in German) (2nd ed.). Berlin: Weidmann.
- Schmidt, Wilhelm (2013). Geschichte der deutschen Sprache (in German) (11th ed.). Stuttgart: Hirzel. ISBN 978-3-7776-2272-9.
- Sonderegger, S. (2003). Althochdeutsche Sprache und Literatur (in German) (3rd ed.). de Gruyter. ISBN 3-11-004559-1.
- Sonderegger, Stefan (1979). Grundzüge deutscher Sprachgeschichte (in German). Vol. I. Berlin, New York: Walter de Gruyter. ISBN 3-11-017288-7.
- Sonderegger S (1980). "Althochdeutsch". In Althaus HP, Henne H, Weigand HE (eds.). Lexikon der Germanistischen Linguistik (in German). Vol. III (2nd ed.). Tübingen: Niemeyer. p. 571. ISBN 3-484-10391-4.
- Wells, C. J. (1987). German: A Linguistic History to 1945. Oxford University Press. ISBN 0-19-815809-2.
- Wright, Joseph (1888). An Old High-German Primer. Oxford: Clarendon Press.

=== Grammars ===
- Braune, Wilhelm; Heidermanns, Frank (2018). Althochdeutsche Grammatik I: Laut- und Formenlehre. Sammlung kurzer Grammatiken germanischer Dialekte. A: Hauptreihe 5/1 (in German) (16th ed.). Berlin, Boston: De Gruyter. ISBN 978-3-11-051510-7.
- Schrodt, Richard (2004). Althochdeutsche Grammatik II: Syntax (in German) (15th ed.). Tübingen: Niemeyer. ISBN 978-3-484-10862-2.
- Wright, Joseph (1906). An Old High German Primer (2nd ed.). Oxford: Clarendon Press. Online version

==== Dialects ====
- Franck, Johannes (1909). Altfränkische Grammatik (in German). Göttingen: Vandenhoeck und Ruprecht.
- Schatz, Josef (1907). Altbairische Grammatik (in German). Göttingen: Vandenhoeck und Ruprecht.
