= Old High German declension =

Language

Old High German is an inflected language, and as such its nouns, pronouns, and adjectives must be declined in order to serve a grammatical function. A set of declined forms of the same word pattern is called a declension. There are five grammatical cases in Old High German.

== Grammatical cases ==
A complete declension consists of five grammatical cases.

=== Description of cases ===
- The nominative case, which is used to express the subject of a statement. It is also used with copulative verbs.
- The accusative case, which expresses the direct object of a verb. In English, except for some pronouns which display a distinct accusative case (e.g., who > whom, I > me, he > him), the accusative and nominative cases are identical.
- The genitive case, which expresses possession, measurement, or source. In English, the genitive case is represented analytically by the preposition of or by the enclitic "–'s", which itself developed from the genitive case. This –'s is related to the common Gothic "-s".
- The dative case, which expresses the recipient of an action, the indirect object of a verb. In English, the prepositions to, from and for most commonly denote this case analytically.
- The instrumental case, which is used to express the object with which its activity is performed. It roughly corresponds to the prepositions with and by. This case only survives in masculine and neuter singular vowel-stem strong declensions in Old High German.

=== Order of cases ===
English grammars of Old High German often present the cases in the order NOM-ACC-GEN-DAT-INST.

== Strong vocalic declensions ==
Note: Declensions are named according to their form in Proto-Germanic. Often intervening sound changes render the once transparent stem endings opaque, and the name may no longer make much sense synchronically. And even diachronically; the i-, ja-, and jō-stems lose their overt i’s in all inherited forms except the masculine and neuter nominative-accusative case during the ninth century.

=== The -a declension ===
This declension has as counterparts the second declension (us/um) of Latin and the omicron declension (os/on) of Greek. It contains masculine and neuter nouns.

	tag; tagā (-a) day m.		wort; wort word n.	
	Singular	Plural	Singular	Plural
Nominative, Accusative	tag	tag–ā (a)	wort	
Genitive	tag–es (as)	tag–o	wort–es (as)	wort–o
Dative	tag–e (a)	tag–um (om, un, on)	wort–e (a)	wort–um (om, un, on)
Instrumental	tag–u (o)	--	wort–u (o)	--

Examples of masculine nouns declined like tag "day": bërg "mountain", wëg "way", geist "spirit", himil "heaven", tiufal "devil", kuning "king". Notes:

- Disyllabic nouns ending in -al, -ar and -an, with long stems, sometimes drop the -a- before an ending beginning with a vowel, e.g. masculine singular ackar "acre, field", genitive singular ackres. Note that in these cases, the -a- is an epenthetic vowel that was not originally present (compare Gothic akrs < Proto-Germanic *akraz), and so the "deletion" of this vowel is really the preservation of the original form.
- Proper names in the -a declension take a pronominal accusative ending -an, e.g. nominative Petrus, accusative Petrusan; similarly truhtīn "God, Lord", accusative truhtīnan.

Examples of neuter nouns declined like wort: barn "child", sēr "pain", swërt "sword", honag "honey". Notes:

- The situation with long-stemmed disyllabic nouns ending in -al, -ar and -an is the same as for the corresponding masculines, e.g. nominative zwīfal "doubt", genitive zwīfles.
- Diminutives in -īn and -līn, e.g. magatīn "little maid" (neuter!), fingarlīn "little finger", are declined the same except in the Upper German dialects. In those dialects, final -n is dropped in the nominative and accusative, and furthermore in Allemannic the nominative and accusative plural end in -iu.
- The neuter plural should have had the ending -u in short-stem neuters, but has lost it due to analogy with long-stem neuters, which exhibit syncope as in Old Saxon and Old English.

=== The -ja declension ===
This declension was originally just the -a declension with an immediately preceding j. However, due to various sound laws, a new declension subcategory has arisen that does not exactly follow the form of the plain -a declension. Similar developments occurred in Greek and the Slavic languages, among others.

This declension has as counterparts the second declension nouns in (-ius/-ium) of Latin. The counterparts in Greek are some second declension nouns in (-ios/-ion), as well as many that show effects of palatalization (e.g., -zdos < *-gyos or *-dyos; -llos < *-lyos; -ptos < -*pyos; -ssos or -ttos < -*tyos; -airos/-eiros/-oiros < *-aryos/-eryos/-oryos; -ainos/-einos/-oinos < *-anyos/enyos/onyos; etc., and similarly for neuter nouns in -ion or *-yon). It contains masculine and neuter nouns.

	hirti; hirte / hirtā (-a) shepherd m.		kunni; kunni race n.	
	Singular	Plural	Singular	Plural
Nominative, Accusative	hirt–i	hirt–e	kunn–i	
Genitive	hirt–es	hirt–eo (io)	kunn–es	kunn–eo (io)
Dative	hirt–ie	hirt–um (un, on) > im (in)	kunn–ie	kunn–um (un, on) > im (in)
Instrumental	hirt–iu	--	kunn–iu	--

Note that the transition from early to late forms occurred during the ninth century. Late-form ja-stems are declined identically to a-stems except for the added -i in the neuter nominative and accusative, in the masculine nominative and accusative singular, and in the dative plural. Compare the equivalent nouns in Old English, e.g. rīce "kingdom" (neuter).

Sample nouns like hirti: agent nouns in -āri (-ari, -eri), e.g. wahtāri (-ari, -eri) "watchman", lērāri "teacher", scrībāri "writer, scribe"; also, karkāri "prison", altāri "altar", rucki "back", phuzzi, puzzi "well", kāsi "cheese".

Sample nouns like kunni: enti "end", rīhhi "kingdom", betti "bed", gizungi "language", finstarnessi "darkness", heri "army" (genitive singular heries, dative singular herie, herige).

=== The -wa declension ===
	snē-o; snēwā (-a) snow m.		kne-o; kne-o knee n.	
	Singular	Plural	Singular	Plural
Nominative, Accusative	snē–(o)	snē–wā (wa)	kne–(o)	
Genitive	snē–wes	snē–wo	knë–wes	knë–wo
Dative	snēw–e	snēw–um (un, on)	knëw–e	knëw–um (un, on)

Notes:

- -o in the nominative can be dropped following a long vowel.
- When a consonant precedes the -w, an epenthetic vowel -a- (sometimes -o- or -e-) appears in the oblique cases, e.g. neuter trëso "treasure", genitive trësawes.

Among the other nouns in this declension:

- Masculine lēo "grave", sēo "sea", scato (genitive scatawes) "shadow", bū (genitive būwes) "dwelling".
- Neuter rēo "corpse", zëso (genitive zësawes) "right side", smëro (genitive smërawes) "grease".

=== The -ō declension ===
This declension counterparts the first declension (a) of Latin, and the alpha declension (a/as) of Greek. It contains feminine nouns. The nominative, which should have had the ending -u, has been merged with the accusative in -a.

	gëba; gëbā gift f.	
	Singular	Plural
Nominative, Accusative	gëb–a	gëb–ā
Genitive	gëb–a (u, o)	gëb–ōnō
Dative	gëb–u (o)	gëb–ōm (–ōn, –on)

Sample nouns of this declension: gëba "gift", ërda "earth", ēra "honor", zala "number", triuwa "fidelity", corunga "temptation", hertida "hardness", miltida "compassion", gi-nāda "favor", lōsunga "deliverance", stunta "time".

=== The -jō declension ===
	sunta; sunte, -eā (-iā) / suntā sin f.		kuningin; kuninginnā queen f.	
	Singular	Plural	Singular	Plural
Nominative, Accusative	sunt–e(a), ia	sunt–e(ā), iā	kuningin	kuningin-nā
Genitive	sunt–e(a), ia	sunt–eōno	kuningin–na	kuninginn–ōno
Dative	sunt–iu	sunt–eōm	kuningin–nu	kuninginn–ōm (–ōn)

Sample nouns like sunta: hella "hell", sibba, sippa "peace", minna "love", krippa "manger".

Sample nouns like kuningin: forasagin "prophetess", friuntin "friend", burdin "burden".

Only early-form jō-stems like sunta are declined in any obviously different way than the other ō-stems. The injō-stems only lack the nominative and accusative singular in -a which the ō-declension should have, which is comparatively subtle.

=== The -i declension ===
This declension counterparts the vowel stems of the third declension (is) of Latin, and the third declension of Greek. It contains masculine and feminine nouns. Note that masculine nouns have become identical to -a stem nouns in the singular, while feminine nouns have preserved the original declension.

	gast; gesti guest m.		anst(i); ensti favor f.	
	Singular	Plural	Singular	Plural
Nominative, Accusative	gast	gest–i	anst(i)	enst–i
Genitive	gast–es	gest–eo (io)	enst–i	enst–eo (io)
Dative	gast–e	gest–im (in) > en	anst–i	enst–im (in) > en
Instrumental	gast (gest)–iu	--		

=== The -u declension ===
This declension was much more reduced compared to other old Germanic languages such as Old English. Most nouns were transferred outright to the i- or sometimes the a-declension, and the remaining nouns were heavily influenced by the i-declension—only the nominative and accusative singular are different, ending in -u.

	situ; siti custom m.		fihu cattle n.
	Singular	Plural	Singular
Nominative, Accusative	sit–u	siti–i	fih–u
Genitive	sit–es	sit–eo (io)	fih–es
Dative	sit–e	sit–im (–in) > en	fih–e
Instrumental	sit–iu	--	

Notes:

- Five masculine nouns follow this declension: situ "custom", fridu "peace", hugu "understanding", sigu "victory", and sunu "son" (also sun).
- Only a single neuter noun, fihu "cattle", follows the declension, and exists only in the singular.
- The only trace of a feminine u-declension is in the word hant "hand", declined as a feminine i-stem except in the dative plural, where the old u-declension forms hantum, -un, -on persist.

=== The -ī declension ===
This class consists of feminine abstract nouns and came about through the falling together of two declensions that were still different in Gothic: compare the Gothic -ei stems (a subclass of the weak declension, formed from adjectives, e.g. diupei "depth", genitive diupeins, from diups "deep") and -eins stems (a subclass of the i-declension, formed from Class I weak verbs, e.g. dáupeins "a dipping", genitive dáupeináis, from dáupjan "to dip").

	hōhī (hōhīn); hōhī (hōhīn) height f.	
	Singular	Plural
Nominative, Accusative	hōhī(–n)	hōhī(–n)
Genitive	hōhī(–n)	hōhī–no
Dative	hōhī(–n)	hōhī–m (n)

Examples of other members of this class: scōnī "beauty", suoẓẓī "sweetness", snëllī "quickness", tiufī "depth", menigī, managī "multitude", irstantanī "resurrection", toufī "a dipping", welī "choice", leitī "a leading", riudī "mange".

== Strong consonantal declensions ==
=== The monosyllabic consonant declension ===
	man; man man m.		naht; naht night f.	
	Singular	Plural	Singular	Plural
Nominative, Accusative	man		naht	
Genitive	mann–es	mann–o	naht	naht–o
Dative	man(–ne)	mann–um (om, un, on)	naht	naht–um (om, un, on)

This class was already falling apart in the earliest texts:

- Only a very small number of nouns remain in this declension. The vast majority have passed over to the i-declension.
- eoman, ioman "someone" and neoman, nioman "no one" have a pronominal ending -an in the accusative singular, e.g. eomannan, neomannan.
- Masculine fuoẓ "foot" has passed over to the i-declension but retains the consonant endings –um (–un, –on) in the dative plural.
- The only trace of neuters of this class is the optional dative singular hūs "to a house" beside regular hūse.
- buoch "book" is declined mostly as a neuter a-stem in the singular but a feminine consonant stem in the plural.
- burg "borough, city" and brust "breast" are sometimes declined as feminine consonant stems but sometimes as feminine i-stems.

=== The -r declension ===
	fater; faterā (-a) father m.		muoter; muoter mother f.	
	Singular	Plural	Singular	Plural
Nominative, Accusative	fater	fater–ā (a)	muoter	
Genitive	fater > –es	fater–o	muoter	muoter–o
Dative	fater > –e	fater–um > –un (–on)	muoter	muoter–um (un, on)

- fater "father" has moved to the a-declension later on, and even in early documents the nominative and accusative plural has borrowed -ā (-a) from the a-stems.
- muoter "mother" preserves the original declension, unmixed with a-stem forms. The other members of this class follow the same declension: bruoder "brother", tohter "daughter", and swëster "sister".

=== The -nd declension ===
	friunt; friunt, friuntā (-a) friend m.	
	Singular	Plural
Nominative, Accusative	friunt	friunt > –ā (–a)
Genitive	friunt–es	friunt–o
Dative	friunt–e	friunt–um > un (on)

This declension has almost entirely merged with the a-declension. Only in early texts do the nominative and accusative plural have a separate, endingless form.

A large number of nouns belong to this declension, such as fīant "enemy", wīgant "warrior", and many others in -ant.

=== The -z declension ===
This class consists of neuter nouns and corresponds to Greek neuters in -os and Latin neuters in -us (genitive -eris, -oris). Formally, these nouns look like regular neuters except that a suffix -ir (from Proto-Germanic -iz-, from Proto-Indo-European -es-) is added to the stem in the plural and triggers umlaut. This class was massively expanded in Middle and Modern High German.

	lamb; lembir lamb n.		
	Singular	Plural	
	Singular	Early	Late
Nominative, Accusative	lamb	lemb–ir	
Genitive	lamb–es	lembiro–iro	
Dative	lamb–e	lemb–irum (irom) > irun (–iron)	
Instrumental	lamb–u (o)	--	

A small number of nouns were declined according to this declension, among them lamb "lamb", kalb "calf", blat "leaf", and grab "grave".

== The weak declension ==
	hano; hanon (-un) cock m.		hërza; hërzun (-on) heart n.		zunga; zungūn tongue f.	
	Singular	Plural	Singular	Plural	Singular	Plural
Nominative	han–o	han–on (un)	hërz–a	hërz–un (on)	zung–a	zung–ūn
Accusative	han–on (un)		hërz–a	hërz–un (on)	zung–ūn	zung–ūn
Genitive	han–en (in)	han–ōno	hërz–en (in)	hërz–ōno	zung–ūn	zung–ōno
Dative	han–en (in)	han–ōm (ōn)	hërz–en (in)	hërz–ōm (ōn)	zung–ūn	zung–ōm (ōn)

== Adjectives ==
Adjectives in Old High German, as in the other Germanic languages, can be declined according to two different paradigms, commonly called "strong" and "weak". This represents a significant innovation in Germanic, although a similar development has taken place in the Baltic and Slavic languages.

Adjectives in Proto-Indo-European—as is still the case in Latin, Greek, and most other daughters—are declined in exactly the same way as nouns. Germanic "strong" adjectives, however, take many of their endings from the declension of pronouns, while "weak" adjectives take the endings of -n stem nouns, regardless of the underlying stem class of the adjective.

In general, weak adjectival endings are used when the adjective is accompanied by a definite article, and strong endings are used in other situations. However, weak endings are occasionally used in the absence of a definite article, and cause the associated noun to have the same semantics as if a definite article were present. In addition, some adjectives are always declined weak or strong, regardless of any accompanying articles.

Strong adjectives are inflected according to a single paradigm, the a/ō-declension. Additional subclasses, the ja/jō- and wa/wō-declensions, differ only in the uninflected forms. Unlike in Gothic, no i-stem or u-stem adjectives exist any more.

=== The strong -a/-ō declension ===
	blint; blintēr, blintaẓ, blintiu blind					
	Singular			Plural		
	Masculine	Neuter	Feminine	Masculine	Neuter	Feminine
Nominative	blint(–ēr)	blint(–aẓ)	blint(–iu)	blint(–e)	blint(–iu)	blint(–o)
Accusative	blint–an	blint(–aẓ)	blint–a	blint–e	blint–iu	blint–o
Genitive	blint–es		blint–era	blint–ero		
Dative	blint–emu (emo)		blint–eru (ero)	blint–ēm (ēn)		
Instrumental	blint–u (o)		--			

Note that an uninflected form optionally occurs in the nominative singular and plural of all genders, and in the accusative singular of the neuter. In the singular cases, either form can be used when the adjective is used attributively (blint man or blintēr man "blind man") or predicatively (dër man ist blintēr or dër man ist blint "the man is blind"). In the plural, the uninflected form can be used as an alternative to the inflected form only when used predicatively (die man sint blinte or die man sint blint "the men are blind"), but not attributively (only blinte man "blind men" can occur).

The existence of two forms of the adjective, one inflected and one uninflected, is for the most part an innovation of Old High German that is not present in the other Germanic languages. In Proto-Germanic, as still in Gothic and Old Saxon, only the neuter singular nominative and accusative had a dual form. In the other old Germanic languages, one or the other neuter form was generalized. The –ēr and –iu endings are also innovations specific to Old High German, based on the third-person personal pronouns. The inherited masculine ending would be – (compare Old English masculine nominative singular blind), and the ending corresponding to –iu would likely either be – or –a.

=== The strong -ja/-jō declension ===
Adjectives of the ja/jō-declension differ from normal a/ō-declension adjectives only in the uninflected form, which ends with an -i. For example, scōni "beautiful" has masculine nominative singular scōnēr. Other examples of such adjectives are festi "fast", māri "famous", tiuri "dear", biderbi "useful", as well as present participles, such as bëranti "bearing".

=== The strong -wa/-wō declension ===
Similarly to ja/jō-stem adjectives, adjectives of the wa/wō-declension differ from normal a/ō-declension adjectives only in the uninflected form, which ends with an -o, like the corresponding nouns. Unlike the ja/jō-stems, however, the -w- in the stem does appear in the inflected forms. Also like the corresponding nouns, if the stem ends in a consonant preceding the final -w, an epenthetic -a- usually develops in the inflected forms between the consonant and the -w. For example, garo "ready" has inflected nominative singular garawēr or sometimes garwēr, while fao, fō "little" has inflected nominative singular fawēr. Other examples of such adjectives are gëlo "yellow", zëso "right(-handed)", slēo, slē "dull", frao, frō "joyful", rao, rō "raw".

=== The weak declension ===
The weak declension for adjectives is identical to the corresponding weak declensions for masculine, neuter and feminine nouns.

	Singular			Plural	
	Masculine	Neuter	Feminine	Masculine, Neuter	Feminine
Nominative	blint–o	blint–a		blint–on (un)	blint–ūn
Accusative	blint–on (un)	blint–a	blint–ūn	blint–on (un)	blint–ūn
Genitive	blint–en (–in)		blint–ūn	blint–ōno	
Dative	blint–en (–in)		blint–ūn	blint–ōm (ōn)	

ja/jō-stem and wa/wō-stem adjectives have identical endings, along with the same stem forms as in the strong inflected forms. For example, scōni "beautiful" has weak masculine nominative singular scōno, while garo "ready" has weak masculine nominative singular gar(a)wo.

== Numerals ==
	Cardinal	Ordinal
one	ein	ēristo, furisto
two	zwei	ander
three	drī	dritto
four	feor, fior	feordo, fiordo
five	fimf, finf	fimfto, finfto
six	sëhs	sëhsto
seven	sibun	sibunto
eight	ahto	ahtodo
nine	niun	niunto
ten	zëhan, zëhen	zëhanto
eleven	einlif	einlifto
twelve	zwelif	zwelifto
thirteen	drīzëhan	drittozëhanto
fourteen	fiorzëhan	fiordozëhanto
fifteen	finfzëhan	finftazëhanto
sixteen	sëhszëhan	sëhstazëhanto
seventeen	*sibunzëhan	sibuntozëhanto
eighteen	ahtozëhan	ahtodazëhanto
nineteen	niunzëhan	niuntazëhanto
twenty	zweinzug	zweinzugōsto
thirty	drīẓẓug, drīẓug	drīẓugōsto
forty	fiorzug	fiorzugōsto
fifty	finfzug	finfzugōsto
sixty	sëhszug	sëhszugōsto
seventy	sibunzug	sibunzugōsto
eighty	ahtozug	ahtozugōsto
ninety	niunzug	niunzugōsto
hundred	zëhanzug, hunt	zëhanzugōsto
two hundred	zwei hunt	
thousand	thūsunt, dūsunt	

ein "one" is normally declined a strong adjective, but is declined as a weak adjective when meaning "alone".

zwei "two" and drī "three" decline as follows:

	zwēne; zwei; zwā (zwō) two		
	Masculine	Neuter	Feminine
Nominative, Accusative	zwēne	zwei	zwā (zwō)
Genitive	zweio		
Dative	zweim, zwein		

	drī; driu; drīo three		
	Masculine	Neuter	Feminine
Nominative, Accusative	drī	driu	drīo
Genitive	drīo		
Dative	drim, drin		

Cardinal numerals feor, fior "four" through zwelif "twelve" are indeclinable adjectives when standing before a noun, but after a noun or when used as a noun decline as follows (approximately, as i-stems):

	sëhsi; sëhsiu, sëhsu six	
	Masculine/Feminine	Neuter
Nominative, Accusative	sëhs–i	sëhs–iu
Genitive	sëhs–eo	
Dative	sëhsim–im > in	

Cardinal numerals zweinzug "20" through zëhanzug "100" are indeclinable nouns, with an associated noun in the genitive plural. hunt "100" presumably behaves like zëhanzug. dūsunt, thūsunt "1000" is mostly treated as a feminine noun, but sometimes as a neuter noun.

The ordinal ander "second" (inflected as anderēr, anderaẓ, anderiu) follows the strong adjectival declension, while the remaining ordinals follow the weak declension.

Other numeral forms:

- Distributive numerals, e.g. einluzze "one by one", zwiske "two by two".
- Multiplicatives, e.g. einfalt "single", zwifalt "double, twofold", etc., declined as adjectives.
- Numeral adverbs, e.g. eines "once", zwiro, zwiror, zwiron "twice", driror "thrice", feorstunt, fiorstunt "four times", fimfstunt, finfstunt "five times", sëhsstunt "six times", etc. Sometimes einstunt, zweistunt, drīstunt also occur.

== Pronouns ==
=== Personal pronouns ===
Case	ih; wir I; we	
Case	Singular	Plural
Nominative	ih	wir
Accusative	mih	unsih
Genitive	mīn	unsēr
Dative	mir	uns

Case	dū, du; ir you	
Case	Singular	Plural
Nominative	dū, du	ir
Accusative	dih	iuwih
Genitive	dīn	iuwēr
Dative	dir	iu

Case	ër; iẓ; siu; etc. he; it; she; they					
Case	Singular			Plural		
Case	Masculine	Neuter	Feminine	Masculine	Neuter	Feminine
Nominative	ër	iẓ	siu; sī, si	sie	siu	sio
Accusative	inan, in	iẓ	sia (sie)	sie	siu	sio
Genitive	(sīn)	is, ës	ira (iru, iro)	iro		
Dative	imu, imo		iru, iro	im, in		

=== Reflexive pronoun ===
Case	sih oneself	
Case	Singular	Plural
Accusative	sih	
Genitive	sīn (ira)	(iro)
Dative	(imu, iru)	(im)

=== Possessive pronouns ===
First and second person possessive pronouns are based on the genitive case of the corresponding personal pronouns, and are declined strong: first person mīnēr, unserēr (or unsarēr), second person dīnēr, iuwerēr (or iuwarēr). The third person possessive pronoun is undeclined for case:

Singular			Plural
Masculine	Neuter	Feminine	
sīn	sīn	ira	iro

In Franconian, shortened forms of unsēr and iuwēr exist, e.g.:

Case	unsēr; unsaẓ; unsu our					
Case	Singular			Plural		
Case	Masculine	Neuter	Feminine	Masculine	Neuter	Feminine
Nominative	unsēr	unsaẓ	unsu	unse	unsu	unso
Accusative	unsan	unsaẓ	unsa	unse	unsu	unso
Genitive	unses		unsera	unsero		
Dative	unsemo		unseru	unsēm, unsen		

=== Demonstrative pronouns / Definite articles ===
Case	dër; daẓ; diu the					
Case	Singular			Plural		
Case	Masculine	Neuter	Feminine	Masculine	Neuter	Feminine
Nominative	dër	daẓ	diu	dē, dea, dia, die	diu, (dei)	deo, dio
Accusative	dën	daẓ	dea, dia, (die)	dē, dea, dia, die	diu, (dei)	deo, dio
Genitive	dës	dës	dëra, (dëru, dëro)	dëro		
Dative	dëmu, dëmo		dëru, (dëro)	dēm, dēn		
Instrumental	diu		–			

In the Franconian dialects:

- Mostly unshifted forms thër, thaẓ, thiu occur.
- In Tatian, an alternative nominative singular form thie (thē) also occurs.
- An alternative nominative and accusative feminine plural thie (rarely thia) also occurs.

	dëse, dësēr; diz; dësiu, disiu (thisu); etc. this; these					
	Singular			Plural		
	Masculine	Neuter	Feminine	Masculine	Neuter	Feminine
Nominative	dëse, dësēr	diz	dësiu, disiu (thisu)	dëse	dësiu, disiu (thisu)	dëso
Accusative	dësan	diz	dësa	dëse	dësiu, disiu (thisu)	dëso
Genitive	dësses		dësera	dësero		
Dative	dësemu, dësemo		dëseru	dësēm, dësen		
Instrumental	dës(i)u, dis(i)u		--			

=== Interrogative pronouns ===
	(h)wër; (h)waẓ who, what, which	
Singular
	Masculine/Feminine	Neuter
Nominative	(h)wër	(h)waẓ
Accusative	(h)wënan, wën	(h)waẓ
Genitive	(h)wës	
Dative	hwëmu, wëmo	
Instrumental	(h)wiu, hiu	

Notes:

- The initial h dropped out in the beginning of the ninth century.
- In the meaning of which, the associated noun is put in the genitive plural, e.g. wër manno "which man".

Additional interrogatives:

- (h)wëdar "which of two"
- (h)wëlīh "which"
- hweolīh "of what sort"
- solīh "such"

All were declined as strong adjectives.

=== Indefinite pronouns ===
Old High German had a number of indefinite pronominal forms.

The following were declined as strong adjectives:

- sum, sumilīh, sumalīh "a certain one, someone"
- ein "one"
- einīg, eining "any, anyone" (in negative polarity sentences)
- thëhein, dëhein "anyone, any" ("no one, no, none" in negative polarity sentences)
- nih(h)ein, noh(h)ein "no, none"
- gilīh "like" ("each" with an associated noun in the genitive plural)
- manno gilīh "each man"
- (gi)wëlīh, eogiwëlīh, iogiwëlīh "each"

The following were declined according to the interrogative-pronoun declension:

- wër, sō wër sō' "whoever"; ëtewër "any one"; see the section on interrogative pronouns for the declension

The following were declined as nouns:

- man "one", declined as a masculine consonant stem
- eoman, ioman "somebody", declined as a masculine consonant stem but with a pronominal accusative singular eomannan, iomannan
- neoman, nioman "nobody", declined as a masculine consonant stem but with a pronominal accusative singular neomannan, niomannan
- wiht, eowiht, iowiht "anything", declined as a neuter a-stem
- neowiht, niowiht "nothing", declined as a neuter a-stem

== See also ==
- Old High German
- Gothic language
- Grammar of the Gothic Language
- Proto-Indo-European noun:
  - Ancient Greek grammar
  - Latin declension
  - Sanskrit nouns
