= Notdef glyph =

A glyph indicating a missing glyph

Common representations of the "notdef glyph".

The notdef glyph or .notdef is a special glyph that indicates that no visual representation (glyph) exists for a character (code point) in text data.

The name is a contraction of not defined. The name .notdef is due to names starting with a period being reserved for internal use by various font definition formats.

The font chooses the appearance of the notdef glyph, it can vary depending on the font. Most commonly seen is an empty rectangle, often called a tofu due to its visual similarity to a block of tofu (cf Noto fonts § Etymology). Sometimes the rectangle has a question mark, cross, or other glyph inside it. This browser and font displays 􏿮. (Note: This is code point U+10FFEE which is in a private-use range and thus unlikely to have a glyph assigned in a normal font. Consequently it should display as the replacement glyph for almost all readers.)

The notdef glyph should not be confused with U+FFFD � REPLACEMENT CHARACTER which is used to indicate encoding errors, which are not code points.

== Usage ==
Text rendering uses the notdef glyph when no glyph is available in the current (computer) font (or any substitute or fallback font). As there are many code points that Unicode has not even assigned appearances to, usage of .notdef is unavoidable.

Before the use of font substitution the glyph was very common, and fixing the display involved changing the current font to one designed for the language of the source text. Nowadays it is most often encountered replacing emoji sent between systems, because one or other of iOS or Android add a Unicode emoji before the other does. It is also seen when text attempts to use new symbols recently added to Unicode (several Wikipedia pages about Unicode demonstrate this). It is also seen when Private Use Areas are used, for example, a group studying an ancient or rare language may need to encode its graphemes: the group can share the grapheme-to-codepoint allocation that they have agreed but readers who do have that information will see only .notdef glyphs.

Some systems use a fallback font that has a glyph for every code point. In this case .notdef is never seen. These fonts often draw a square with a generic symbol or the hex code point inside it.

== See also ==
- replacement character – Unicode character
- substitute character – Non-printing computer data item
- Character encoding – Using numbers to represent text characters
- mojibake – Garbled text as a result of incorrect character encodings
- Font – Particular size, weight and style of a typeface
- Typeface – Set of characters that share common design features
- Typographic symbol
- Unicode – Character encoding standard
