= Mac OS Icelandic encoding =

Character encoding on Macintosh computers

Mac OS Icelandic
- Alias(es): x-mac-icelandic
- Languages: Icelandic; Faroese
- Created by: Apple, Inc.
- Classification: Extended ASCII, Mac OS script
- Extends: US-ASCII
- Based on: Mac OS Roman
- Other related encoding: Macintosh-Latin

Mac OS Icelandic is an obsolete character encoding that was used in Apple Macintosh computers to represent Icelandic text. It is largely identical to Mac OS Roman, except for the Icelandic special characters Ý, Þ and Ð which have replaced typography characters.

IBM uses code page 1286 (CCSID 1286) for Mac OS Icelandic.

== Layout ==
Each character is shown with its equivalent Unicode code point. Only the second half of the table (code points 128–255) is shown, the first half (code points 0–127) being the same as ASCII.

Mac Icelandic
	0	1	2	3	4	5	6	7	8	9	A	B	C	D	E	F
8x	Ä	Å	Ç	É	Ñ	Ö	Ü	á	à	â	ä	ã	å	ç	é	è
9x	ê	ë	í	ì	î	ï	ñ	ó	ò	ô	ö	õ	ú	ù	û	ü
Ax	Ý	°	¢	£	§	•	¶	ß	®	©	™	´	¨	≠	Æ	Ø
Bx	∞	±	≤	≥	¥	µ	∂	Σ	∏	π	∫	ª (Note: In the TrueType Mac Icelandic fonts, the character 0xBB maps to Unicode character U+FB01 ﬁ LATIN SMALL LIGATURE FI, a stylistic ligature.)	º (Note: In the TrueType Mac Icelandic fonts, the character 0xBC maps to Unicode character U+FB02 ﬂ LATIN SMALL LIGATURE FL, a stylistic ligature.)	Ω	æ	ø
Cx	¿	¡	¬	√	ƒ	≈	∆	«	»	…	NBSP	À	Ã	Õ	Œ	œ
Dx	–	—	“	”	‘	’	÷	◊	ÿ	Ÿ	/	€ (Note: Before Mac OS 8.5, the character 0xDB mapped to the currency sign, Unicode character U+00A4 ¤ CURRENCY SIGN.)	Ð	ð	Þ	þ
Ex	ý	·	‚	„	‰	Â	Ê	Á	Ë	È	Í	Î	Ï	Ì	Ó	Ô
Fx	(Note: The character 0xF0 is a solid Apple logo. Apple uses U+F8FF in the Corporate Private Use Area for this logo, but it is usually not supported on non-Apple platforms.)	Ò	Ú	Û	Ù	ı	ˆ	˜	¯	˘	˙	˚	¸	˝	˛	ˇ

Differences from Mac OS Roman
