= Unicode control characters =

Non-printing control codes and format effectors included in Unicode

Many Unicode characters are used to control the interpretation or display of text, but these characters themselves have no visual or spatial representation. For example, the null character (U+0000 NULL) is used in C-programming application environments to indicate the end of a string of characters. In this way, these programs only require a single starting memory address for a string (as opposed to a starting address and a length), since the string ends once the program reads the null character.

In the narrowest sense, a control code is a character with the general category Cc, which comprises the C0 and C1 control codes, a concept defined in ISO/IEC 2022 and inherited by Unicode, with the most common set being defined in ISO/IEC 6429. Control codes are handled distinctly from ordinary Unicode characters, for example, by not being assigned character names (although they are assigned normative formal aliases). In a broader sense, other non-printing format characters, such as those used in bidirectional text, are also referred to as control characters by software; these are mostly assigned to the general category Cf (format), used for format effectors introduced and defined by Unicode itself.

== Category "Cc" control codes (C0 and C1) ==
The control code ranges 0x00–0x1F ("C0") and 0x7F originate from the 1967 edition of US-ASCII. The standard ISO/IEC 2022 (ECMA-35) defines extension methods for ASCII, including a secondary "C1" range of 8-bit control codes from 0x80 to 0x9F, equivalent to 7-bit sequences of ESC with the bytes 0x40 through 0x5F. Collectively, codes in these ranges are known as the C0 and C1 control codes. Although ISO/IEC 2022 allows for the existence of multiple control code sets specifying differing interpretations of these control codes, their most common interpretation is specified in ISO/IEC 6429 (ECMA-48).

The ISO/IEC 8859 series of encodings conforms to ISO/IEC 4873 (ECMA-43) level 1, a subset of ISO/IEC 2022 designed for 8-bit character encodings, and therefore reserves the range 0x80–0x9F for use as non-printing codes by C1 control code sets such as ISO/IEC 6429. Unicode inherits its first and second blocks (comprising U+0000 through U+00FF) from ASCII and ISO/IEC 8859-1, thus incorporating the C0 and C1 control code ranges (U+0000–U+001F, U+007F–U+009F) as general category "Cc". It does not assign normative names to these control codes, though it does assign them normative aliases.

Category "Cc" control codes can serve a variety of purposes, not limited to format effectors: for example, the default ASCII C0 set includes six format effectors (BS, HT, LF, VT, FF and CR), ten transmission controls, four device controls, four information separators and eight other control codes. Most of these characters play no explicit role in Unicode text handling, and are used only by higher-level protocols such as those used by terminal emulators. Certain characters are commonly used for formatting or sentinel purposes:

- U+0000 NULL (used in null-terminated strings)
- U+0009 HORIZONTAL TABULATION (HT) (inserted by the tab key)
- U+000A LINE FEED (LF) (used as a line break)
- U+000C FORM FEED (FF) (denotes a page break in a plain text file)
- U+000D CARRIAGE RETURN (CR) (used in some line-breaking conventions)
- U+0085 NEXT LINE (NEL) (sometimes used as a line break in text transcoded from EBCDIC)

Unicode only specifies semantics for U+0009—U+000D, U+001C—U+001F, and U+0085 (the ASCII format effectors except for BS, plus the ASCII information separators and the C1 NEL). The rest of the "Cc" control codes are transparent to Unicode and their meanings are left to higher-level protocols, although interpretation as defined in ISO/IEC 6429 is suggested as a default. Furthermore, certain specialised higher-level protocols, such as transcoded Teletext, may include a different interpretation of the entire C0 control code range.

== Unicode introduced separators ==
In an attempt to simplify the several newline characters used in legacy text, Unicode introduced its own newline characters to separate either lines or paragraphs: U+2028 LINE SEPARATOR (abbreviated LS or LSEP) and U+2029 PARAGRAPH SEPARATOR (abbreviated PS or PSEP).

Like CR and LF, LS and PS are effectors for text formatting; unlike CR and LF, they are not treated as "control codes" for ECMA-35/ECMA-48 purposes (category Cc), rather having semantics defined entirely by Unicode itself. They are assigned to sui generis Unicode categories Zl and Zp respectively, under the major category Z (separator) used for certain whitespace characters.

== Language tags ==
Unicode includes 128 characters, now deprecated, previously intended as language tags. These characters essentially mirrored the 128 ASCII characters but were used to identify the subsequent text as belonging to a particular language according to BCP 47. For example, to indicate subsequent text as the variant of English as written in the United States, the sequence U+E0001 LANGUAGE TAG, U+E0065 TAG LATIN SMALL LETTER E, U+E006E TAG LATIN SMALL LETTER N, U+E002D TAG HYPHEN-MINUS, U+E0055 TAG LATIN CAPITAL LETTER U and U+E0053 TAG LATIN CAPITAL LETTER S would have been used.

These language tag characters would not be displayed themselves. However, they would provide information for text processing or even for the display of other characters. For example, the display of Unihan ideographs might have substituted different glyphs if the language tags indicated Korean than if the tags indicated Japanese. Another example, might have influenced the display of decimal digits 0 through 9 differently depending on the language they appeared in.

The tag characters U+E0001 LANGUAGE TAG and U+E007F CANCEL TAG were deprecated in Unicode 5.1 (2008) and should not be used for language information. The characters U+E0020—U+E0073 were also deprecated, but were restored with the release of Unicode 8.0 (2015). The change was made "to clear the way for the potential future use of tag characters for a purpose other than to represent language tags". Unicode states that "the use of tag characters to represent language tags in a plain text stream is still a deprecated mechanism for conveying language information about text.

== Interlinear annotation ==
Three formatting characters provide support for interlinear annotation (U+FFF9 INTERLINEAR ANNOTATION ANCHOR, U+FFFA INTERLINEAR ANNOTATION SEPARATOR, U+FFFB INTERLINEAR ANNOTATION TERMINATOR). This may be used for providing notes that would typically be displayed between the lines of other text. Unicode considers such annotation to be rich text and recommends using other protocols for such annotation. The W3C Ruby markup recommendation is an example of an alternate protocol supporting more advanced interlinear annotation.

== Bidirectional text control ==
Unicode supports standard bidirectional text without any special characters. In other words Unicode conforming software should display right-to-left characters such as Hebrew letters as right-to-left by using the properties of those characters. Similarly, Unicode handles the mixture of left-to-right-text alongside right-to-left text without any special characters. For example, one can quote Arabic ("بسم الله") (translated into English as "Bismillah") right alongside English and the Arabic letters will flow from right-to-left and the Latin letters left-to-right.

However, directionality may not be detected correctly if left-to-right text is quoted at the beginning of a right-to-left paragraph (or vice versa), and the support for bidirectional text becomes even more complicated when text flowing in opposite directions is embedded hierarchically, for example if an English text quotes an Arabic phrase that in turn quotes an English phrase. Other situations may also complicate this, such as when an author wants the left-to-right characters overridden so that they flow from right-to-left. While these situations are fairly rare, Unicode provides twelve characters to help control these embedded bidirectional text levels up to 125 levels deep:

- U+061C ARABIC LETTER MARK
- U+200E LEFT-TO-RIGHT MARK
- U+200F RIGHT-TO-LEFT MARK
- U+202A LEFT-TO-RIGHT EMBEDDING
- U+202B RIGHT-TO-LEFT EMBEDDING
- U+202C POP DIRECTIONAL FORMATTING
- U+202D LEFT-TO-RIGHT OVERRIDE
- U+202E RIGHT-TO-LEFT OVERRIDE
- U+2066 LEFT-TO-RIGHT ISOLATE
- U+2067 RIGHT-TO-LEFT ISOLATE
- U+2068 FIRST STRONG ISOLATE
- U+2069 POP DIRECTIONAL ISOLATE

== Variation selectors ==
Many characters map to alternate glyphs depending on the context. For example, Arabic and Latin cursive characters substitute different glyphs to connect glyphs together depending on whether the character is the initial character in a word, the final character, a medial character or an isolated character. These types of glyph substitution are easily handled by the context of the character with no other authoring input involved. Authors may also use special-purpose characters such as joiners and non-joiners to force an alternate form of glyph where it would not otherwise appear. Ligatures are similar instances where glyphs may be substituted simply by turning ligatures on or off as a rich text attribute.

However, for other glyph substitution, the author's intent may need to be encoded with the text and cannot be determined contextually. This is the case with character/glyphs referred to as gaiji where different glyphs are used for the same character either historically or for ideographs for family names. This is one of the gray areas in distinguishing between a glyph and a character. If a family name differs slightly from the ideograph character it derives from, then is that a simple glyph variant or a character variant? As of Unicode 3.2 and 4.0, the character set now includes 256 variation selectors so that these combining mark characters can select from 256 possible character/glyph variations for the preceding character.

== Control pictures ==
Unicode provides graphic characters for representing C0 control codes (and space and a generic newline) in the Control Pictures block. They are visual representations, not the actual control codes themselves. There are no equivalent characters for the C1 control codes.

Control Pictures^{[1]}^{[2]} Official Unicode Consortium code chart (PDF)
	0	1	2	3	4	5	6	7	8	9	A	B	C	D	E	F
U+240x	␀	␁	␂	␃	␄	␅	␆	␇	␈	␉	␊	␋	␌	␍	␎	␏
U+241x	␐	␑	␒	␓	␔	␕	␖	␗	␘	␙	␚	␛	␜	␝	␞	␟
U+242x	␠	␡	␢	␣	␤	␥	␦	␧	␨	␩						
U+243x																
Notes 1.As of Unicode version 17.0 2.Grey areas indicate non-assigned code points

== See also ==
- Specials (Unicode block)
- ISO 2047
