= Control Pictures =

- Range: U+2400..U+243F (64 code points)
- Plane: BMP
- Scripts: Common
- Symbol sets: Control code graphics
- Assigned: 42 code points
- Unused: 22 reserved code points

Unicode version history
- 1.0.0 (1991): 37 (+37)
- 3.0 (1999): 39 (+2)
- 16.0 (2024): 42 (+3)

Unicode documentation
- Code chart ∣ Web page

Control Pictures is a Unicode block containing characters for graphically representing the C0 control codes, and other control characters. Its block name in Unicode 1.0 was Pictures for Control Codes.

Code points U+0000 NULL to U+0020 SPACE can be mapped onto their corresponding control picture by incrementing the code point by 0x2400. For example, the corresponding control picture for U+000A LINE FEED is 0x000A + 0x2400 = 0x240A (␊).

== Block ==
Control Pictures^{[1]}^{[2]} Official Unicode Consortium code chart (PDF)
	0	1	2	3	4	5	6	7	8	9	A	B	C	D	E	F
U+240x	␀	␁	␂	␃	␄	␅	␆	␇	␈	␉	␊	␋	␌	␍	␎	␏
U+241x	␐	␑	␒	␓	␔	␕	␖	␗	␘	␙	␚	␛	␜	␝	␞	␟
U+242x	␠	␡	␢	␣	␤	␥	␦	␧	␨	␩						
U+243x																
Notes: 1. As of Unicode version 17.0; 2. Grey areas indicate non-assigned code points

== History ==
The following Unicode-related documents record the purpose and process of defining specific characters in the Control Pictures block:

Version	Final code points (Note: Proposed code points and characters names may differ from final code points and names)	Count	L2 ID	WG2 ID	Document
1.0.0	U+2400..2424	37			(to be determined)
3.0	U+2425	1		N1138	LaBonté, Alain (1995-01-30), Proposal to add new characters (Keyboard related) to 10646
3.0	U+2425	1		N1203	Umamaheswaran, V. S.; Ksar, Mike (1995-05-03), "6.1.6", Unconfirmed minutes of SC2/WG2 Meeting 27, Geneva
3.0	U+2425	1		N1303 (html, doc)	Umamaheswaran, V. S.; Ksar, Mike (1996-01-26), Minutes of Meeting 29, Tokyo
3.0	U+2425	1	L2/97-128	N1564	Paterson, Bruce (1997-05-15), Draft pDAM for various additional characters (the "holding bucket")
3.0	U+2425	1	L2/97-288	N1603	Umamaheswaran, V. S. (1997-10-24), "7.3", Unconfirmed Meeting Minutes, WG 2 Meeting # 33, Heraklion, Crete, Greece, 20 June – 4 July 1997
3.0	U+2425	1	L2/98-005R	N1682	Text of ISO 10646 - AMD 22 for PDAM registration and PDAM ballot, 1997-12-17
3.0	U+2425	1	L2/98-320	N1898	ISO/IEC 10646-1/FPDAM 22, AMENDMENT 22: Keyboard Symbols, 1998-10-22
3.0	U+2425	1		N1897	Paterson, Bruce; Everson, Michael (1998-10-22), Disposition of Comments - FPDAM22 - Keyboard Symbols - SC2 N3191
3.0	U+2425	1	L2/99-010	N1903 (pdf, html, doc)	Umamaheswaran, V. S. (1998-12-30), Minutes of WG 2 meeting 35, London, U.K.; 1998-09-21--25
3.0	U+2425	1	L2/99-126		Paterson, Bruce (1999-04-14), Text for FDAM ballot ISO/IEC 10646 FDAM #22 - Keyboard symbols
3.0	U+2426	1		N1045	Defect Report on 10646 Repoertoire (Add ISO 2047symbols), 1994-08-01
3.0	U+2426	1		N1203	Umamaheswaran, V. S.; Ksar, Mike (1995-05-03), "6.1.3.2", Unconfirmed minutes of SC2/WG2 Meeting 27, Geneva
3.0	U+2426	1	L2/98-004R	N1681	Text of ISO 10646 – AMD 18 for PDAM registration and FPDAM ballot, 1997-12-22
3.0	U+2426	1		N1875	Defect Report on REVERSED QUESTION MARK in FPDAM 18, 1998-09-22
3.0	U+2426	1	L2/98-318	N1894	Revised text of 10646-1/FPDAM 18, AMENDMENT 18: Symbols and Others, 1998-10-22
3.0	U+2426	1	L2/99-010	N1903 (pdf, html, doc)	Umamaheswaran, V. S. (1998-12-30), "6.7.3", Minutes of WG 2 meeting 35, London, U.K.; 1998-09-21--25
16.0	U+2427..2429	3	L2/21-235 (full, no_attach, sources, mappings_zip)		Bettencourt, Rebecca; Ewell, Doug; Bánffy, Ricardo; Everson, Michael; Hietaniemi, Jarkko; Silva, Eduardo Marín; Mårtenson, Elias; Shoulson, Mark; Steele, Shawn; Turner, Rebecca (2021-12-20), Proposal to add further characters from legacy computers and teletext to the UCS
16.0	U+2427..2429	3	L2/22-023		Anderson, Deborah; Whistler, Ken; Pournader, Roozbeh; Constable, Peter (2022-01-22), "17 Legacy Computing Symbols", Recommendations to UTC #170 January 2022 on Script Proposals
16.0	U+2427..2429	3	L2/21-235R (full, no_attach)		Bettencourt, Rebecca; Ewell, Doug; Bánffy, Ricardo; Everson, Michael; Hietaniemi, Jarkko; Silva, Eduardo Marín; Mårtenson, Elias; Shoulson, Mark; Steele, Shawn; Turner, Rebecca (2022-01-26), Proposal to add further characters from legacy computers and teletext to the UCS
16.0	U+2427..2429	3	L2/22-016		Constable, Peter (2022-04-21), "D.1 17 Legacy Computing Symbols", UTC #170 Minutes

== See also ==
- ISO 2047
