= Gloss (annotation) =

Marginal notation of the meaning of a word or wording

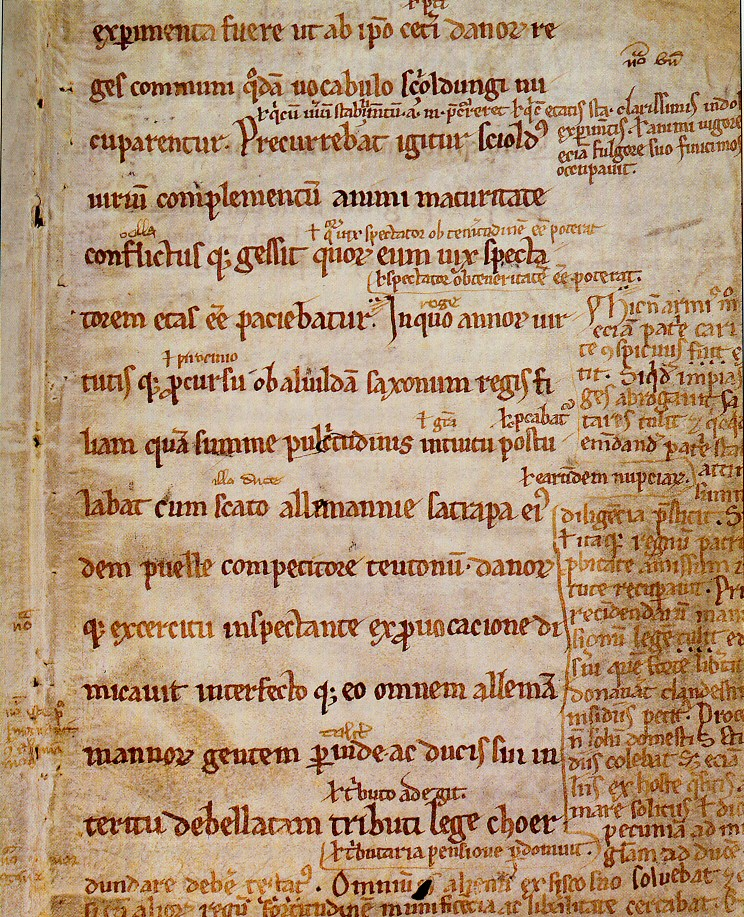
A gloss is a notation regarding the main text in a document. Shown is a parchment page from the Royal Library of Copenhagen.

A gloss is a brief notation, especially a marginal or interlinear one, of the meaning of a word or wording in a text. It may be in the language of the text or in the reader's language if that is different.

A collection of glosses is a glossary. A collection of medieval legal glosses, made by glossators, is called an apparatus. The compilation of glosses into glossaries was the beginning of lexicography, and the glossaries so compiled were in fact the first dictionaries. In modern times a glossary, as opposed to a dictionary, is typically found in a text as an appendix of specialized terms that the typical reader may find unfamiliar. Also, satirical explanations of words and events are called glosses. The German Romantic movement used the expression of gloss for poems commenting on a given other piece of poetry, often in the Spanish Décima style.

Glosses were originally notes made in the margin or between the lines of a text in a classical language; the meaning of a word or passage is explained by the gloss. As such, glosses vary in thoroughness and complexity, from simple marginal notations of words one reader found difficult or obscure, to interlinear translations of a text with cross-references to similar passages. Today parenthetical explanations in scientific writing and technical writing are also often called glosses. Hyperlinks to a glossary sometimes supersede them. In East Asian languages, ruby characters are glosses that indicate the pronunciation of logographic Chinese characters.

== Etymology ==
Starting in the 14th century, a gloze in the English language was a marginal note or explanation, borrowed from French glose, which comes from medieval Latin glōsa, classical glōssa, meaning an obsolete or foreign word that needs explanation. Later, it came to mean the explanation itself. The Latin word comes from Greek γλῶσσα 'tongue, language, obsolete or foreign word'. In the 16th century, the spelling was refashioned as gloss to reflect the original Greek form more closely.

== In theology ==
Glosses and other marginal notes were a primary format used in medieval Biblical theology and were studied and memorized for their own merit. Many Biblical passages came to be associated with a particular gloss, whose truth was taken to be scriptural. Indeed, in one case, it is generally reckoned that an early gloss explicating the doctrine of the Trinity made its way into the Scriptural text itself, in the passage known as the "three heavenly witnesses" or the Comma Johanneum, which is present in the Vulgate Latin and the third and later editions of the Greek Textus Receptus collated by Erasmus (the first two editions excluded it for lack of manuscript evidence), but is absent from all modern critical reconstructions of the New Testament text, such as Westcott and Hort, Tischendorf, and Nestle-Aland.

== In law ==
In the medieval legal tradition, the glosses on Roman law and Canon law created standards of reference, so-called sedes materiae 'seat of the matter'. In common law countries, the term "judicial gloss" refers to what is considered an authoritative or "official" interpretation of a statute or regulation by a judge. Judicial glosses are often very important in avoiding contradictions between statutes, and determining the constitutionality of various provisions of law.

== In literature ==
- A gloss, or glosa, is a verse in traditional Iberian literature and music which follows and comments on a refrain (the "mote"). See also villancico.
- An 1817 version of The Rime of the Ancient Mariner featured a gloss.

== In philology ==
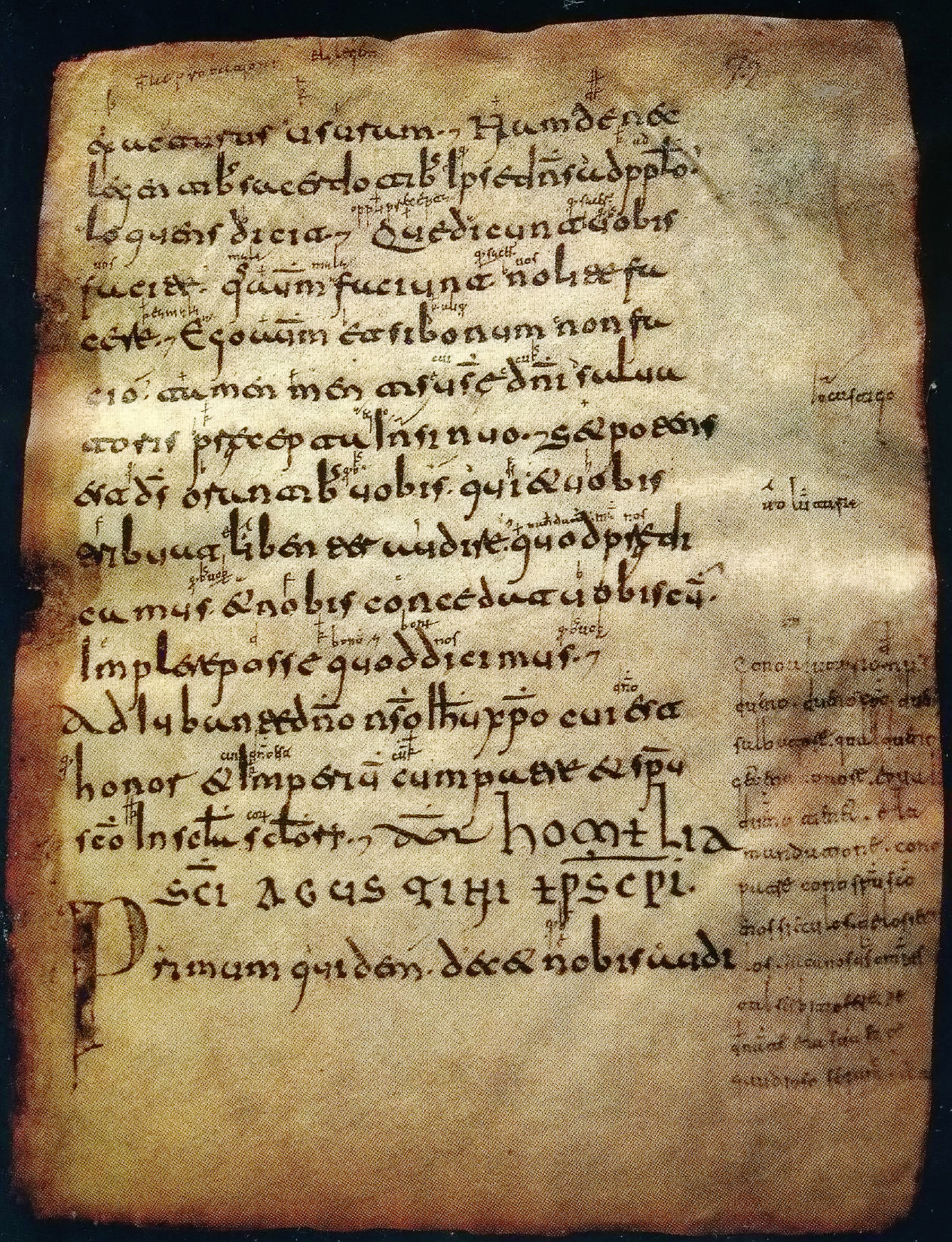
The Glosas Emilianenses are glosses added to this Latin codex that are now considered the first phrases written in the Castilian language.

Glosses are of some importance in philology, especially if one language—usually, the language of the author of the gloss—has left few texts of its own. The Reichenau Glosses, for example, gloss the Latin Vulgate Bible in an early form of one of the Romance languages, and as such give insight into late Vulgar Latin at a time when that language was not often written down, but more importantly, the language of the glosses themselves give vital information on an early form and evolution of a Gallo-Romance with few extant documents. A series of glosses in the Old English language to Latin Bibles give us a running translation of Biblical texts in that language; see Old English Bible translations. Glosses of Christian religious texts are also important for our knowledge of Old Irish. Glosses frequently shed valuable light on the vocabulary of otherwise little-attested languages; they are less reliable for syntax, because many times the glosses follow the word order of the original text, and translate its idioms literally.

== In linguistics ==
In linguistics, a simple gloss in running text may be marked by quotation marks and follow the transcription of a foreign word to serve as a translation. Single quotes is a widely used convention. For example:

- A Cossack longboat is called a chaika 'seagull'.
- The moose gains its name from the Algonquian mus or mooz ('twig eater').

A longer or more complex transcription may rely upon an interlinear gloss. Such a gloss may be placed between a text and its translation when it is important to understand the structure of the language being glossed, and not just the overall meaning of the passage.

=== Glossing sign languages ===
Sign languages are typically transcribed word-for-word by means of a gloss written in the predominant oral language in all capitals; for example, American Sign Language and Auslan would be written in English. Prosody is often glossed as superscript words, with its scope indicated by brackets.

[I LIKE]^{NEGATIVE} [WHAT?]^{RHETORICAL}, GARLIC.
"I don't like garlic."

Pure fingerspelling is usually indicated by hyphenation. Fingerspelled words that have been lexicalized (that is, fingerspelling sequences that have entered the sign language as linguistic units and that often have slight modifications) are indicated with a hash. For example, W-I-K-I indicates a simple fingerspelled word, but #JOB indicates a lexicalized unit, produced like J-O-B, but faster, with a barely perceptible O and turning the "B" hand palm side in, unlike a regularly fingerspelled "B".
