= Code page 1019 =

Computer character set for Dutch

Code Page 1019 (CCSID 1019), also known as CP1019, is the code page for the Dutch version of ISO 646. It is roughly equivalent to ASCII, differing only in replacing the tilde with a macron.

It should not be confused with the significantly different Code page 1102, which also complies with the ISO 646 invariant structure, and is the Dutch version of DEC's National Replacement Character Set (NRCS).

== Code page layout ==
Code page 1019
	0	1	2	3	4	5	6	7	8	9	A	B	C	D	E	F
0x	NUL	SOH	STX	ETX	EOT	ENQ	ACK	BEL	BS	HT	LF	VT	FF	CR	SO	SI
1x	DLE	DC1	DC2	DC3	DC4	NAK	SYN	ETB	CAN	EM	SUB	ESC	FS	GS	RS	US
2x	SP	!	"	#	$	%	&	'	(	)	*	+	,	-	.	/
3x	0	1	2	3	4	5	6	7	8	9	:	;	<	=	>	?
4x	@	A	B	C	D	E	F	G	H	I	J	K	L	M	N	O
5x	P	Q	R	S	T	U	V	W	X	Y	Z	[	\	]		_
6x	`	a	b	c	d	e	f	g	h	i	j	k	l	m	n	o
7x	p	q	r	s	t	u	v	w	x	y	z	{	|	}	¯	DEL
Difference from ASCII

== See also ==
- Code page 1102
