= Code page 1102 =

Computer character set for Dutch

Code page 1102 (CCSID 1102), also known as CP1102 or NL7DEC, is an IBM code page number assigned to the Dutch variant of DEC's National Replacement Character Set (NRCS). The 7-bit character set was introduced for DEC's computer terminal systems, starting with the VT200 series in 1983, but is also used by IBM for their DEC emulation. It is called DUTCH by Kermit.

Although NL7DEC complies with the ISO 646 invariant layout (and is hence a close derivation from ASCII, with only nine code points differing), it is not ISO646-NL, which is otherwise unrelated (Code page 1019).

== Code page layout ==
Code page 1102 (DEC NRCS Dutch)
	0	1	2	3	4	5	6	7	8	9	A	B	C	D	E	F
0x	NUL	SOH	STX	ETX	EOT	ENQ	ACK	BEL	BS	HT	LF	VT	FF	CR	SO	SI
1x	DLE	DC1	DC2	DC3	DC4	NAK	SYN	ETB	CAN	EM	SUB	ESC	FS	GS	RS	US
2x	SP	!	"	£	$	%	&	'	(	)	*	+	,	-	.	/
3x	0	1	2	3	4	5	6	7	8	9	:	;	<	=	>	?
4x	¾	A	B	C	D	E	F	G	H	I	J	K	L	M	N	O
5x	P	Q	R	S	T	U	V	W	X	Y	Z	ĳ	½	|		_
6x	`	a	b	c	d	e	f	g	h	i	j	k	l	m	n	o
7x	p	q	r	s	t	u	v	w	x	y	z	¨	ƒ	¼	´	DEL
Differences from ASCII

== See also ==
- National Replacement Character Set (NRCS)
- Code page 1019
