= Rent-A-Girlfriend (TV series) =

Japanese anime television series

- 彼女、お借りします; Kanojo, Okarishimasu
- Genre: Harem; Romantic comedy
- Based on: Rent-A-Girlfriend by Reiji Miyajima
- Developed by: Mitsutaka Hirota
- Directed by: Kazuomi Koga (S1–2, 4–5); Shinya Une (S3)
- Voices of: Shun Horie; Sora Amamiya; Aoi Yūki; Nao Tōyama; Rie Takahashi; Yū Serizawa
- Narrated by: Kenyu Horiuchi (Note: Episode 45 only)
- Music by: Hyadain; Yusuke Itagaki; Tomoyuki Otake; Tadaaki Tsukada (S3)
- Country of origin: Japan
- Original language: Japanese
- No. of seasons: 5
- No. of episodes: 60 (list of episodes)

Production
- Executive producers: Hideyuki Igarashi; Yasuhiro Tanada
- Producers: List: Yuri Terao; Hiroyuki Aoi (S1) / chief; (S2–5); Tsutomu Tachibana (S2–5); Noboru Yamada (chief; (S3–5); Hiroaki Yamazaki (S2–4); Daiki Kakizaki (S2–3); Takuya Matsumoto (S4–5); Airi Sawada (S1 / chief; S2); Chiyo Kawazoe (chief; S1); Toshihiro Maeda (chief; S1); Shin Furukawa (chief; S2); Kōhei Matsuoka (S5)
- Cinematography: Shintarō Sakai
- Animator: TMS Entertainment (Note: Studio Comet was collectively credited for Animation Production Assistance (アニメーション制作協力) from seasons 2–3. For the first season, only studio staff members were credited under this label.)
- Editor: Yumiko Nakaba
- Running time: 24 minutes (S1–2, 4–5); 23 minutes (S3)
- Production companies: Kodansha; Mainichi Broadcasting System; DMM Pictures (S1–2); DMM.com (S3–5)

Original release
- Network: MBS, TBS
- Release: July 11, 2020 – present

Rent-A-Girlfriend (Japanese: 彼女、お借りします, Hepburn: Kanojo, Okarishimasu), abbreviated in Japan as Kanokari (かのかり), is a Japanese anime television series based on the manga series Rent-A-Girlfriend by Reiji Miyajima. The story follows a young college student who begins using a rental girlfriend service following a breakup with his ex-girlfriend.

== Plot ==
Kazuya Kinoshita is dumped by his girlfriend, Mami Nanami, after one month of dating. Feeling dejected, he uses a mobile app to rent a girlfriend and meets Chizuru Mizuhara. After an initially rocky start where Kazuya calls out her "authentic" act, the two are forced into a fake relationship when Kazuya's grandmother is hospitalized and becomes smitten with Chizuru. They soon discover they are next-door neighbors and attend the same university.

== Series overview ==
Season	Episodes	Originally released	
Season	Episodes	First released	Last released
1	12	July 11, 2020	September 26, 2020
2	12	July 2, 2022	September 17, 2022
3	12	July 8, 2023	September 30, 2023
4	12	July 5, 2025	September 20, 2025
5	12	April 11, 2026	June 27, 2026

== Cast and characters ==
Character	Japanese	English
Kazuya Kinoshita (木ノ下 和也, Kinoshita Kazuya)	Shun Horie	Aleks Le (S1–3); Alex Mai (S4–5)
Chizuru Mizuhara (水原 千鶴, Mizuhara Chizuru)	Sora Amamiya	Lizzie Freeman (S1–3); Celeste Perez (S4–5)
Mami Nanami (七海 麻美, Nanami Mami)	Aoi Yūki	Laura Stahl
Ruka Sarashina (更科 瑠夏, Sarashina Ruka)	Nao Tōyama	Sarah Anne Williams
Sumi Sakurasawa (桜沢 墨, Sakurasawa Sumi)	Rie Takahashi	Suzie Yeung
Mini Yaemori (八重森 みに, Yaemori Mini)	Yū Serizawa	Lisette Monique Diaz

== Production and release ==
An anime television series adaptation was announced in December 2019. The series was animated by TMS Entertainment and directed by Kazuomi Koga, with Mitsutaka Hirota handling series composition, Kanna Hirayama designing the characters, and Hyadain composing the music. It aired from July 11 to September 26, 2020, on the Super Animeism programming block on MBS, TBS, and their JNN affiliates. (Note: MBS and TBS listed the series premiere at 25:25 on July 10, 2020, which is effectively July 11 at 1:25 a.m. JST.) The first season ran for 12 episodes.

Crunchyroll streamed the series outside of Asia. On August 11, 2020, Crunchyroll announced that the series would receive an English dub, which premiered on August 28. In Southeast Asia and South Asia, the series is licensed by Muse Communication and released on the streaming service iQIYI in Southeast Asia. Animax Asia later began airing the series.

In September 2020, shortly before the first season's finale was streamed internationally, it was announced that a second season had been greenlit for production. The main cast and staff reprised their roles, with Studio Comet cooperating in the production. The second season aired from July 2 to September 17, 2022. (Note: MBS and TBS listed the season premiere at 25:25 on July 1, 2022, which is effectively July 2 at 1:25 a.m. JST.)

On May 18, 2021, it was announced that Sentai Filmworks had acquired the home media rights.

After the final episode of the second season, a third season was announced, with Shinya Une replacing Kazuomi Koga as director. It aired from July 8 to September 30, 2023. (Note: MBS listed the season premiere at 25:23 on July 7, 2023, which is effectively July 8 at 1:23 a.m. JST.)

In July 2024, a fourth season was announced. The staff and cast from the previous seasons once again reprised their roles, with Kazuomi Koga returning as director. Originally scheduled to be released in two split cours, the fourth season ended up being released as a single cours, airing from July 5 to September 20, 2025, on the Animeism programming block on MBS, TBS, CBC Television, RKB, HBC, BS-TBS, and AT-X. (Note: MBS, TBS, and CBC listed the season premiere at 26:23 on July 4, 2025, which is effectively July 5 at 2:23 a.m. JST.) (Note: Episodes were released on DMM TV, D Anime Store, and Crunchyroll four days before their televised airings.)

A fifth season, which was originally intended to be the second cours of the previous season, aired from April 11 to June 27, 2026. (Note: MBS, TBS, and CBC listed the season premiere at 26:23 on April 10, 2026, which is effectively April 11 at 2:23 a.m. JST.) (Note: Episodes were released on DMM TV and Crunchyroll three days before their televised airings.)

Following the airing of the final episode of the fifth season, a sixth season was announced.

== Music ==
The musical score for the series is primarily composed by Hyadain, with Yusuke Itagaki and Tomoyuki Otake providing additional tracks. For the first season, the Peggies performed the opening theme "Centimeter" (センチメートル, Senchimētoru). Halca performed the first ending theme "Kokuhaku Bungee Jump" (告白バンジージャンプ; "Confession Bungee Jump") starting from Episodes 2–6 and 8–11, (Note: "Kokuhaku Bungee Jump" is used as an insert song in episode 12.) while Halca also performed the second ending theme "First Drop" for Episode 7, (Note: "First Drop" by Halca is heard during the end credits of Episode 7.) and Sora Amamiya performed the third ending theme "Kimi wo Tousite" (君を通して; "Through You") for Episode 12.

For the second season, the opening theme is "Himitsu Koi-Gokoro" (ヒミツ恋ゴコロ; "Secret Love Heart") by CHiCO with HoneyWorks, while the ending theme is "Ienai" (言えない; "Can't Say") by MIMiNARI featuring Asmi.

For the third season, the opening theme is "Renai Miri Film" (恋愛ミリフィルム; "Love Millimeter Film") by Halca. (Note: "Renai Miri Film" is used as an insert song in episode 48.) Amber's performed the first ending theme "End Roll" (エンドロール) from Episodes 25–31 and 34–36, and the second ending theme "End Roll (Ballad Version)" (エンドロール (Ballad Version)) from Episodes 32–33. (Note: "End Roll (Ballad Version)" is heard during the end credits of Episodes 32 and 33.)

For the fourth season, the opening theme song is "Umitsuki" performed by ClariS, while the ending theme song is "Boku no Vega" (ぼくのベガ; "My Vega") performed by Regal Lily.

For the fifth season, the opening theme song is "Non Scenario Etude" (ノンシナリオ・エチュード) performed by Sora Amamiya, while the ending theme song is "204-gōshitsu" (204号室; "Room 204") performed by Nakigoto. For the ending of episode 52, an acoustic version of "Boku no Vega" was used.

== Reception ==
The series has received generally mixed to negative reviews. Joe Ballard of Comic Book Resources (CBR) described the anime adaptation as a "hot mess" with sluggish pacing but also an "intriguing, action-packed rom-com and a semi-developing love story". Meanwhile, Ethan Wescoatt of CBR praised the story, which he called "mature" for a harem anime, in addition to the male and female leads, noting that Chizuru was an intriguing character due to hiding her true, multidimensional personality behind her perfect girlfriend façade and that Kazuya's struggles were relatable to the audience.

Alex Henderson of Anime Feminist described the series premiere as "comedy of errors with a horny streak" but noted that but it also hinted at deeper themes. They further noted that the dynamic between Kazuya and Chizuru was intriguingly balanced despite the slapstick violence. Henderson praised the anime for touching on the social implications of the rental girlfriend business, treating Chizuru with respect and highlighting her agency. Meanwhile, Dee of Anime Feminist, who reviewed the first three episodes of the anime, noted that the series initially showed promise as a refreshing and potentially progressive rom-com anime adding that Chizuru was a well-developed character and Kazuya having potential for growth. However, Dee criticized the reveal of Mami's manipulative and abusive behavior in the third episode, stating it "suck all the joy out of the series". Dee further stated that the episode reduced Kazuya to a stereotypical "boilerplate hapless harem protagonist".

Nicholas Dupree of Anime News Network described the first two seasons as being tedious, with an interesting conflict introduced only at the last minute, while the preceding episodes were filled with repetitive and uninteresting rom-com antics. He added that while expectations for season three were low, the series "surprisingly" delivered a compelling romantic dramedy that addressed the flaws of Kazuya and found a "solid" narrative focus. Dupree concluded that the third season's production quality was consistent with previous seasons, focusing on character appeal, especially for the female characters. He noted that despite flaws, the third season offered the best material in a while, addressing key issues and delivering a compelling story.

DMM TV announced that the fifth season was the second most-watched anime of Spring 2026 on its platform.

=== Accolades ===
==== Awards and nominations ====
Year	Award	Category	Recipient	Result	Ref.
2020	D Anime Store Awards	Heart-Pounding Anime	Rent-A-Girlfriend	2nd place	
2020	AT-X	Top Anime Ranking	Rent-A-Girlfriend	20th place	
2021	5th Crunchyroll Anime Awards	Best Girl	Chizuru Mizuhara	Nominated	
2021	5th Crunchyroll Anime Awards	Best Couple	Chizuru Mizuhara and Kazuya Kinoshita	Nominated	
2021	7th Anime Trending Awards	Anime of the Year	Rent-A-Girlfriend	Nominated	
2021	7th Anime Trending Awards	Girl of the Year	Chizuru Mizuhara	Won	
2021	7th Anime Trending Awards	Supporting Man of the Year	Yoshiaki Kibe	Nominated	
2021	7th Anime Trending Awards	Supporting Girl of the Year	Sumi Sakurasawa	Nominated	
2021	7th Anime Trending Awards	Best in Character Design	Kanna Hirayama Rent-A-Girlfriend	Won	
2021	7th Anime Trending Awards	Opening Theme Song of the Year	"Centimeter" by The Peggies	Nominated	
2021	7th Anime Trending Awards	Comedy Anime of the Year	Rent-A-Girlfriend	Nominated	
2021	7th Anime Trending Awards	Romantic Anime of the Year	Rent-A-Girlfriend	Nominated	
2022	D Anime Store Awards	Heart-Pounding Anime	Rent-A-Girlfriend Season 2	10th place	
2024	10th Anime Trending Awards	Girl of the Year	Chizuru Mizuhara	Nominated	
2024	10th Anime Trending Awards	Ending Theme Song of the Year	"End Roll" by Amber's	Nominated	
