= List of Rent-A-Girlfriend characters =

The manga series Rent-A-Girlfriend and its adaptations features an extensive cast of characters created by Reiji Miyajima.

== Main ==
Kazuya Kinoshita (木ノ下 和也, Kinoshita Kazuya)
Voiced by: Jun Fukushima (2017 commercial), Haruki Ishiya (2018 commercial), Shun Horie (anime) (Japanese); Aleks Le (seasons 1–3), Alex Mai (seasons 4–5) (English)
Portrayed by: Ryusei Onishi
A 20-year-old college student who lives in Tokyo. Following a painful breakup with his girlfriend, Mami Nanami, he decides to rent a girlfriend named Chizuru Mizuhara.^{Ch. 1} He soon finds himself in situations where he has to continue renting Chizuru to keep up appearances with his family and friends, and he eventually falls in love with her.^{Ch. 2–3, 16} Later on, he begins working part-time at a karaoke bar to pay for his dates and other expenses.^{Ch. 32} He later crowdfunds a movie starring Chizuru in order for her to get more attention and connections after he learned about her dreams of wanting to have her grandmother watch her on the silver screen.^{Ch. 61, 102–127} He has a pet lungfish that he takes care of in an aquarium at home.^{Ch. 41}
Chizuru Mizuhara (水原 千鶴, Mizuhara Chizuru) / Chizuru Ichinose (一ノ瀬 ちづる, Ichinose Chizuru)
Voiced by: Sora Amamiya (2017 commercial, anime), Aoi Yūki (2018 commercial) (Japanese); Lizzie Freeman (seasons 1–3), Celeste Perez (seasons 4–5) (English)
Portrayed by: Hiyori Sakurada
A college student who moonlights as a rental girlfriend for the Diamond company. On campus, she goes under her real name Chizuru Ichinose, and utilizes a nerdy appearance with large dark-framed glasses and braided pigtails.^{Ch. 1–3} It is later revealed that Chizuru and Kazuya are next-door neighbors in their apartment complex.^{Ch. 2–3} She continues to let Kazuya rent her services in order to help his grandmother Nagomi, and to help him get over his breakup with Mami.^{Ch. 3, 6} She was raised by her maternal grandparents as her mother died when she was young and her father abandoned the family.^{Ch. 61} She admires her grandmother Sayuri, who was once an actress, and hopes to follow in her footsteps.^{Ch. 100}
Mami Nanami (七海 麻美, Nanami Mami)
Voiced by: Aoi Yūki (2018 commercial, anime) (Japanese); Laura Stahl (English)
Portrayed by: Shiori Akita
Kazuya's former girlfriend. She has short blonde hair.^{Ch. 1} She appears to be friendly on the outside but harbors jealous and possessive feelings that scare her friends sometimes.^{Ch. 4, 7} She is shocked and suspicious that Kazuya has found another girlfriend immediately after she dumped him.^{Ch. 4–6}
Ruka Sarashina (更科 瑠夏, Sarashina Ruka)
Voiced by: Nao Tōyama (Japanese); Sarah Anne Williams (English)
Portrayed by: Mio Kudo
A girl who is introduced as Shun Kuribayashi's girlfriend. In actuality, she is also working as a rental girlfriend for another company. She wants to date Kazuya for real after seeing how kindly and passionately he treats Chizuru and her.^{Ch. 20–25} She has a health condition where she has a low heart rate that she monitors, and Kazuya is the first guy who elevated it.^{Ch. 28} Later on in the series, she quits her rental girlfriend job and starts working at the same karaoke bar as Kazuya.^{Ch. 37}
Sumi Sakurasawa (桜沢 墨, Sakurasawa Sumi)
Voiced by: Rie Takahashi (Japanese); Suzie Yeung (English)
Portrayed by: Aika Sawaguchi
A girl with pink hair who also works as a rental girlfriend with Chizuru's company.^{Ch. 41–44} She is in her first year at college and is a newcomer to the industry.^{Ch. 41, 54} She has a shy personality and through Chizuru's urging, goes on dates with Kazuya in order to improve her skills as a rental girlfriend, later developing feelings for him.^{Ch. 41–44, 54} In her spin-off manga, Rent-A-(Really Shy!)-Girlfriend, it is revealed she decided to become a rental girlfriend due to a desire to pursue a career as an idol.^{Ch. 3}
Mini Yaemori (八重森 みに, Yaemori Mini)
Voiced by: Yū Serizawa (Japanese); Lisette Monique Diaz (English)
A girl who is a neighbor to both Kazuya and Chizuru.^{Ch. 105} She is a social media influencer and into cosplay,^{Ch. 115} and provides insight on crowdfunding to Kazuya when he and Chizuru decide to make an independent film together.^{Ch. 118–119} She also encourages him to truly pursue Chizuru.^{Ch. 114–115, 133}

== Supporting ==
Nagomi Kinoshita (木ノ下 和, Kinoshita Nagomi)
Voiced by: Yukari Nozawa (Japanese); Alex Cazares (English)
Portrayed by: Hana Kino
Kazuya's paternal grandmother. She is thrilled to find out that Kazuya and Chizuru are a couple.^{Ch. 1} She operates a family-owned liquor store with Kazuya's parents and is friends with Chizuru's grandmother.^{Ch. 1–2}
Kazuo Kinoshita (木ノ下 和男, Kinoshita Kazuo)
Voiced by: Yūki Sanpei (Japanese); Chris Hackney (English)
Portrayed by: Oideyasu Oda
Kazuya's father. He operates a family-owned liquor store with his mother and wife.^{Ch. 1}
Harumi Kinoshita (木ノ下 晴美, Kinoshita Harumi)
Voiced by: Miki Natsutani (Japanese); Colleen O'Shaughnessey (English)
Portrayed by: Kaoru Noguchi
Kazuya's mother. She operates a family-owned liquor store with her husband and mother-in-law.^{Ch. 1}
Yoshiaki Kibe (木部 芳秋, Kibe Yoshiaki)
Voiced by: Masayuki Akasaka (Japanese); Nicolas Roye (English)
Portrayed by: Shunya Kaneko
Kazuya's childhood friend and college schoolmate.^{Ch. 1, 4} He occasionally gives Kazuya advice about how to deal with his relationships.^{Ch. 4, 7, 10, 12, 16} He also personally knows Kazuya's grandmother Nagomi, working part-time to help with her business.^{Ch. 4, 44}
Shun Kuribayashi (栗林 駿, Kuribayashi Shun)
Voiced by: Gakuto Kajiwara (Japanese); Landon McDonald (English)
Portrayed by: Kōsuke Suzuki
Kazuya's friend and college schoolmate. He has short light hair and wears glasses.^{Ch. 1} He often goes by "Kuri" (くり).^{Ch. 20}
Sayuri Ichinose (一ノ瀬 小百合, Ichinose Sayuri)
Voiced by: Sayuri Sadaoka (Japanese); Colleen O'Shaughnessey (English)
Portrayed by: Mayumi Asaka
Chizuru's maternal grandmother.^{Ch. 2} In her heyday, Sayuri was an actress, inspiring Chizuru to become one herself.^{Ch. 100} Sayuri and her late husband Katsuhito raised their granddaughter together after Chizuru's single mother died.^{Ch. 61} She later falls ill and dies, albeit not before she is able to watch Chizuru's movie at the hospital.^{Ch. 146–152}
Umi Nakano (中野 海, Nakano Umi)
Voiced by: Kaito Ishikawa (Japanese); Edward Bosco (English)
Portrayed by: Ryōsuke Sota
Chizuru's friend and classmate in acting school. Kazuya mistakenly believes Umi is Chizuru's real boyfriend at first.^{Ch. 29–31}
