= List of Tsukimichi: Moonlit Fantasy episodes =

Tsukimichi: Moonlit Fantasy is an anime television series based on the light novel series written by Kei Azumi and illustrated by Mitsuaki Matsumoto. A television series adaptation was announced on October 20, 2020. The series is animated by C2C and directed by Shinji Ishihira, with Kenta Ihara handling series' composition, Yukie Suzuki designing the characters, and Yasuharu Takanashi composing the series' music. It aired from July 7 to September 22, 2021, on Tokyo MX and other networks. Crunchyroll licensed the series and streams it worldwide excluding Asian territories. Medialink has licensed the series in Southeast Asia and South Asia, and is streaming it on their Ani-One YouTube channel under their Ultra membership scheme. The opening theme, "Gamble", is performed by syudou, while the ending theme, "Beautiful Dreamer", is performed by Ezoshika Gourmet Club. On April 27, 2022, Crunchyroll announced that the series would receive an English dub, which premiered the following day.

After the airing of the final episode, a second season was announced. The two consecutive-cour season was animated by J.C.Staff, with the main staff returning from the first season. It aired from January 8 to June 25, 2024. The first opening theme song is "Utopia", performed by Keina Suda, while the first ending theme is "My Factor", performed by Kent Itō. The second opening theme song is "Reversal", performed by syudou, while the second ending theme song is "Jōshiki Hazure Human" (常識外れヒューマン, "Eccentric Human"), performed by Kaori Maeda.

After the final episode of the second season, a third season was announced.

== Series overview ==
| Season | Episodes | | Originally released | |
| Season | Episodes | | First released | Last released |
|---|---|---|---|---|
| 1 | 12 | | July 7, 2021 | September 22, 2021 |
| 2 | 25 | 12 | January 8, 2024 | March 25, 2024 |
| 2 | 25 | 13 | April 1, 2024 | June 24, 2024 |

== Episodes ==
=== Season 1 (2021) ===
| No. overall | No. in season | Title (Note: All English titles are taken from Crunchyroll.) | Directed by (Note: Information is taken from the ending credits of each episode.) | Written by | Storyboarded by | Original release date |
|---|---|---|---|---|---|---|
| 1 | 1 | "Failed... Hero"; Transliteration: "Yūsha... Shikkaku" (Japanese: 勇者...失格) | Kazunobu Shimizu | Kenta Ihara | Shinji Ishihira | July 7, 2021 (Note: This episode was pre-screened on July 2, 2021 on dAnimeStore.) |
Misumi Makoto is transported to another world to become a hero by God Tsukuyomi. The other world's Goddess deems Makoto too ugly and banishes him to her world Wasteland, infested with non-humans and monsters, giving him only the ability to understand all languages. Tsukuyomi intervenes, explaining in Japan Makoto's abilities were restricted by modern life, but in the new world, he is quite powerful and free to do whatever he pleases. After wandering the Wasteland for three days Makoto saves a young Orc named Emma from a two-headed wolf monster which he kills, discovering how strong he now is. Emma explains she was supposed to be a sacrifice to the God Shen to dispel the fog around her village so crops could grow. She takes him to her village where Makoto begins to learn magic. Makoto decides to destroy Shen, a giant dragon who uses the fog to create illusions. Shen traps Makoto inside an illusion of a happy memory but after examining his other memories, he becomes intrigued by his memories of Japan. Makoto breaks the illusion and is surprised when Shen offers to make a contract with him to become his familiar. Makoto agrees and they form a contract with Shen transforming into a busty samurai girl, looking forward to what Makoto will do in the future.
| 2 | 2 | "Black Spider of Disaster"; Transliteration: "Saigai no Kuro Kumo" (Japanese: 災害の黒蜘蛛) | Yūshi Suzuki | Kenta Ihara | Shinji Ishihira | July 14, 2021 |
Makoto discovers Shen is obsessed with his memories of historical dramas and samurai. She teleports Makoto to the alternate dimension where she normally lives but finds it now resembles Japan's countryside. Makoto informs the orcs he defeated Shen who offers for the orcs to live in her dimension which is now ideal for farming. Shen continues watching Makoto's memories but demands they figure out how to build a television where she can store his memories. Makoto decides to discover more about his parents whom Tsukoyomi told him were born in this world before moving to Japan. Shen appears with an injured dwarf, explaining their dimension is being attacked by a spider called Black Disaster that is cursed with eternal hunger and consumes everything. Makoto manages to completely obliterate the spider but collapses as the spider regenerates. Shen tries to intervene but the spider suddenly declares the extreme violence has satisfied its masochistic hunger and she is determined to stay with Makoto forever. Shen suggests the spider also form a contract with Makoto to gain a human form and she agrees with Shen performing the ritual despite Makoto being unconscious. Makoto awakens and finds he has a new, similarly busty female servant who makes him slightly nervous.
| 3 | 3 | "Human Shock"; Transliteration: "Hyūman Shokku" (Japanese: ヒューマンショック) | Ayaka Tsujihashi | Kenta Ihara | Shinji Ishihira | July 21, 2021 |
The dwarf is revealed to be Beren, an Elder Dwarf capable of crafting artifacts. Beren also moves his village into Shen's dimension. Shen and the spider request personal names, so Makoto renames Shen Tomoe after Tomoe Gozen, and names the spider Mio. Makoto discovers while he is unconscious that Tomoe and Mio go recruiting and his village is now populated by orcs, dwarves, mist lizards, and similar spiders. Makoto returns to the normal world and finds a human village, but they attack him. Tomoe explains Makoto's magical aura is so strong the humans probably mistook him for a Demon Lord. Makoto spends months learning the human language and has the dwarves craft items to suppress his aura. Entering the human village posing as merchants they register at an Adventurers Guild. Tomoe and Mio break records by being four times as powerful as the next strongest adventurer, while Makoto, due to his suppressed aura, ranks Level One, weaker than a child. Tomoe learns a dragon she knew, Lancer, has been killed by an adventurer named Sofia Bulga. Makoto notices the price of commodities is unusually high and that people have begun following them. Tomoe prepares to foil a night attack on their wagon. While buying food Makoto and Mio are approached by a young girl.
| 4 | 4 | "Too Late"; Transliteration: "Ato no Matsuri" (Japanese: あとのまつり) | Hiro Ōki | Kenta Ihara | Shinji Ishihira | July 28, 2021 |
The girl, Rinon, reveals her sister Toa disappeared. Tomoe confronts the thieves but kills three by accident and captures the fourth. Rinon sketches Toa and Makoto determines from the thief's memories their group is holding her captive and sends Mio and Tomoe to retrieve her. Makoto is concerned Toa resembles a girl named Hasegawa he knew in Japan. Mio and Tomoe locate Toa and her captor, Mils Ace, the current strongest adventurer. Rinon sneaks away and tells the thieves Makoto's wagon is full of expensive fruit but he has already sold it. The thieves insist she steals Makoto's gold to pay Toa's debts. Mils, the thieves' secret leader, reveals a Demon Lord recently approached the city and had a bounty placed on its head, so he wants Mio and Tomoe to help hunt it, not realizing the Demon Lord was Makoto. Rinon decides she cannot steal from Makoto after he is so nice to her. Mio and Tomoe defeat Mils, and his thieves, and destroy part of the city competing to see who defeated the most enemies. Rinon reunites with Toa, who is identical to Hasegawa apart from her hair color. Makoto praises Mio and Tomoe for rescuing Toa, but then violently blasts them back to the Wasteland to repent for foolishly destroying the entire human city.
| 5 | 5 | "The Greedy Wagon's Journey"; Transliteration: "Yokubari Basha no Tabi" (Japanese: よくばり馬車の旅) | Yoshito Hata | Kenta Ihara | Shinji Ishihira | August 4, 2021 |
Tomoe alters everyone's memories, so the world believes a monster horde destroyed Zetsuya. As Zetsuya's guild was destroyed Makoto must re-register in Tsige, the next closest town. Makoto tricks Tomoe into training alone in the wilderness while he travels to Tsige with other adventurers. Mio and Makoto kill many monsters that Toa harvests for valuable parts, including rare Ruby Eye Ants. Re-registering in Tsige, Makoto celebrates with adventurers Louisa the elven archer, Hazal the human alchemist, and Ranina the dwarf Priest Knight. Makoto decides to sell the Ruby Eye's to the Rembrandt Trading Company but is warned by Toa that Rembrandt has a bad reputation. Returning to his village Emma reports on their progress. The Alke are settling in the mountains, the dwarves have begun constructing buildings, and the mist lizards clearing farmland while the orcs have begun constructing Makoto a castle. Makoto worries Tomoe has been gone a long time. Makoto is given a merchant outfit by the dwarves to further suppress his aura, but his magic is too powerful and destroys the outfit. Makoto discovers magical ingredients grown in the demi-plane are more potent than normal. Makoto takes the Ruby Eye's to Rembrandt and finds the manager difficult to deal with.
| 6 | 6 | "The Melancholy of Handsome Middle-Aged Men"; Transliteration: "Naisu Midoru no Yūutsu" (Japanese: ナイスミドルの憂鬱) | Kazunobu Shimizu | Kenta Ihara | Shinji Ishihira | August 11, 2021 |
The manager, Patrick Rembrandt, is dismissive until he sees the Ruby Eyes and apologizes. He happily reveals the Eyes make Ambrosia, a cure for his wife and daughters cursed by a witch. Makoto goes to register as a merchant and passes the written exam easily as it is basic middle school mathematics. The second test is to gather four dangerous items, but he takes advantage of a rule saying he can substitute items of equal value and substitute the Ruby Ants. Makoto returns to the demiplane where he plans to set up a hidden portal to trick traveling merchants into thinking the demiplane is a hidden city, trade for demiplane items, and then return home, creating a demand for demiplane products. Locating Tomoe with Mio, Makoto realizes Mio has become addicted to his memories of anime and children's cartoons. Tomoe and Mio are confused when Makoto chooses to sleep alone rather than pick one of them to have sex and decide they must come up with a seduction plan. Hazal agrees to Makoto's request to help brew the Ambrosia. An adventurer watches Makoto and decides to gather as many adventurers as he can to stop whatever Patrick is doing with Makoto.
| 7 | 7 | "Wondrous Medicine Production"; Transliteration: "Hiyaku Seisei" (Japanese: 秘薬精製) | Yūsuke Onoda | Kenta Ihara | Shinji Ishihira | August 18, 2021 |
Patrick secretly has the witch doctor who cursed his family dead. Hazal brews the ambrosia. Makoto can restrain Patrick's wife, Lisa, who has become a monster and Patrick successfully administers the ambrosia. Using this method, they also cure Patrick's daughters. Makoto returns to Tomoe and Mio, but they are attacked by the adventurer, Lime Latte, and his numerous allies. After defeating all 200 enemies Lime claims he only wanted a sleeping curse to be put on Lisa and her daughters as revenge for Patrick preventing adventurers who displeased him from finding further work, many of whom later died on quests too dangerous for them to handle and has no idea why the witch doctor cursed them into monsters. Lime apologizes to Patrick, who decides to let him live, and Lime retires from adventuring. Tomoe, who had seen in Lime's memories that he sends his wages to the orphanage where he grew up, gives him a katana forged by the dwarves and hires him to spy for her. Meanwhile, despite his gratitude to Makoto, Patrick considers what to do about Makoto starting a competing trading company. Returning to the demiplane Emma informs Makoto yet another problem has arisen.
| 8 | 8 | "Demiplane Ranking"; Transliteration: "Akū Rankingu" (Japanese: 亜空ランキング) | Yūshi Suzuki | Kenta Ihara | Shinji Ishihira | August 25, 2021 |
The warriors in Makoto's village are depressed after training and Makoto learns it is his fault as during training, he overwhelms them so completely they lose their self-confidence. He also realizes the various species do not train with each other, so he arranges weekly competitions, inspiring them to strengthen themselves and each other. Makoto, Mio, and Tomoe re-register as adventurers and are immediately asked to train an adventurer to replace Lime Latte. Makoto chooses Toa and asks Tomoe to train her, though Tomoe is troubled as she knows Toa resembles the girl from Japan and worries Makoto misses his former life. Tomoe puts Toa and her team through a brutal training regime and then tests their new abilities by ordering them to defeat a nest of 100 ape monsters, proving them the strongest adventuring team. Makoto decides to collect Ambrosia Flowers, the flowers eaten by the Ruby Ants that make their eyes valuable. He also decides to rent shop space from Patrick who realizes Makoto wants to rent as buying would bring him to the attention of the Tsige kingdom who would ask him to spy on Patrick, which Makoto does not want to do. Patrick agrees to arrange a shop space for Makoto in a neutral city not allied to any kingdom.
| 9 | 9 | "Eat or Be Eaten"; Transliteration: "Kuu ka Kuwareru ka" (Japanese: 喰うか喰われるか) | Ayumu Uwano | Kenta Ihara | Shinji Ishihira | September 1, 2021 |
The village throws a party to celebrate Makoto opening his trading company. Akine reveals they have located ambrosia flowers in the outside world but decided not to harvest any as they are protected by elves. Mio and Tomoe sense Makoto dying repeatedly during archery training. Tomoe deduces when Makoto clears his mind to focus on the target he unintentionally merges with the environment and dies for a split second, which feels to Tomoe and Mio like he has committed suicide. This has caused his mana to increase to God's level. If it continues the Goddess who banished him to the Wasteland will see him as a rival and try to kill him. Makoto returns to the human world and is approached by a prostitute, so he is dragged away by the furious Mio and Tomoe. They declare they are tired of waiting for him to grow up and will have sex with him immediately. Makoto panics and flees through a portal. The dwarves forge more powerful mana-suppressing equipment. Mio apologizes for her and Tomoe's behavior, so Makoto invites her to help negotiate with the elves. Other adventurers also appear to steal the flower, one of whom is the prostitute, and cause the elves to attack immediately.
| 10 | 10 | "Hidden Ogre Village"; Transliteration: "Oni no Kakurezato" (Japanese: 鬼の隠れ里) | Ayaka Tsujihashi | Kenta Ihara | Shinji Ishihira | September 8, 2021 |
Makoto teleports the adventurers to the demiplane and then makes peace with the elves, Aqua and Eris. Makoto meets Nilgistori and other elders. Nilgistori's son, Adono, is angry the barrier protecting the forest is weakening. Makoto meets Aqua and Eris' master, Mondo, a powerful warrior. Mio suspects Mondo is possessed and overhears a telepathic conversation between Adono and an unknown person about demons. Later a spirit frees itself from Mondo's body and drains the life from Adono, killing him for associating with demons. Makoto identifies it as a Lich and captures it. Tomoe reveals she was the dragon who created the barrier at Nilgistori's request many years ago. The Lich explains he accidentally became a Lich while trying to become a Grant, a human that can freely travel between alternate worlds like a God. Tomoe reveals he has it the wrong way round, Grants are not humans who could travel, they are normal humans who accidentally travelled and so earned the title of Grant. Realizing he has wasted his entire life on an impossible goal the Lich happily accepts Tomoe's suggestion of forming a contract with Makoto and teaching him about magic. The adventurers decide to escape the demiplane. Forming a contract returns the Lich from a skeleton to a young and attractive man. A magical explosion occurs in the village causing Tomoe to collapse.
| 11 | 11 | "Goodbye"; Transliteration: "Sayōnara" (Japanese: さようなら) | Hiro Ōki | Kenta Ihara | Shinji Ishihira | September 15, 2021 |
Makoto and Lich can heal the injured. Makoto realizes the explosion forced open the portal to the outside world. Examining the memory fragments of the racist prostitute, Makoto sees that she and her comrades attempted to steal magical items and when guards intervened one of the rings full of Makoto's magic exploded, killing Tomoe's child fragment and an orc. Makoto follows and coldly kills the prostitute in revenge. After the funerals, Makoto learns from Lich, now named Shiki, that he can see the prostitute's memories because memory viewing is one of Tomoe's powers, a sign they trust each other implicitly, though this makes Mio jealous. Makoto orders walls constructed so that any adventurers who visit the demiplane to trade are kept separate from the village itself. Makoto visits Patrick who has arranged Makoto's shop space in the neutral town of Rotsguard Academy. Makoto hopes to visit the academy to learn more about the world, the Goddess, and humans. As he may be gone for a considerable time, he takes only Shiki with him and gives Mio and Tomoe more memories as gifts. As they prepare to teleport the Goddess suddenly locates Makoto and tampers with his teleportation, sending him to a distant battlefield where two demon warriors attack him and sever two of his fingers.
| 12 | 12 | "Guided by the Moon..."; Transliteration: "Tsuki ga Michibiku..." (Japanese: 月が導く...) | Kazunobu Shimizu | Kenta Ihara | Shinji Ishihira | September 22, 2021 |
The two reveal they are Sofia Bulger and Mitsurugi, the strongest adventurer in the world, and the Superior Dragon she became famous for supposedly killing. They explain they have joined the Demon Army to destroy humanity. Makoto removes all his mana-suppressing equipment, overwhelming Mitsurugi with his magic and shattering Sofia's legendary sword. Makoto manages to teleport away, leaving Mitsurugi and Sofia alive who swears revenge. Patrick receives word of the army's destruction from a powerful mage but does not realize it is Makoto. Shiki believes the Goddess used Makoto to destroy the army and maybe watch them. Tomoe reveals she created another fragment named Komoe using Makoto's mana from a discarded ring and Mio is furious when Komoe calls Makoto "Papa". Makoto finally opens a shop which is an instant success and learns after he teleported away that the demon and human armies did massive damage to each other, and that two other Goddess-summoned heroes took part in the battle. The village throws a feast to celebrate Makoto's shop and he decides his future looks bright. Still, the feast is interrupted by another fight between Mio and Tomoe, causing Makoto to change his mind that his immediate future is quite annoying.

=== Season 2 (2024) ===
| No. overall | No. in season | Title | Directed by | Written by | Storyboarded by | Original release date |
|---|---|---|---|---|---|---|
| 13 | 1 | "What? Moon Over the Ruined Castle?"; Transliteration: "E？Kōjō no Tsuki？" (Japanese: え？荒城の月？) | Kazunobu Shimizu | Kenta Ihara | Shinji Ishihira | January 8, 2024 |
On the way to the town of Orbitt, Makoto and Shiki arrive in a town and notices a villager asking for help, as her village is being attacked by a band of thieves known as "Moon Over the Ruined Castle." Angry at a group of criminals using the name of music he likes, Makoto accompanies the villager and her wolfman friend to her village and defeats the thieves. Reunited with Shiki, who arranged a place for them to stay the night, Makoto wonders about the two other heroes summoned by the Goddess and their whereabouts. Meanwhile, Mio has the other villagers taste some new recipes she came up with, with disastrous results.
| 14 | 2 | "The Heroes Are a Couple of Beauties"; Transliteration: "Futari no Yūsha wa Binan Bijo" (Japanese: 二人の勇者は美男美女) | Yoshiyuki Nogami, Momo Shimizu | Kenta Ihara | Shinji Ishihira | January 15, 2024 |
Sometime after discarding Makoto, the Goddess summons two other humans from Earth to become her heroes; Hibiki Otonashi who studied in the same school as Makoto's, and Tomoki Iwahashi, a middle school student and model. As a gifted individual from an affluent family, Hibiki was bored with her life as she never had to face any hardships. She is convinced by the goddess to serve her when offered a chance to truly challenge herself. After forming her party, Hibiki grew stronger and accumulated victories until they came across Mio in her spider form and were almost killed. For Tomoki, the goddess bestowed him with the ability to become immortal at night and the power to charm any woman with his left eye, unintentionally using it to charm all members of his party. However, the princess that he serves, Lily Front Gritonia, resists his charm, and starts manipulating Tomoki for her own gains.
| 15 | 3 | "Stellar Wars"; Transliteration: "Sutera・Wōzu" (Japanese: ステラ・ウォーズ) | Katsushi Sakurabi | Kenta Ihara | Shinji Ishihira | January 22, 2024 |
Hibiki and Tomoki participated in a joint battle to take over Stella Fortress, which is held by demons. Soon after, the troops supporting them fell into a trap, and the heroes were confronted by the demon army's general Io. When Io used his powers to negate the Goddess' blessings, Tomoki decided to flee, realizing that he lost his immortality and forcing Hibiki's party to face the general by themselves. As Tomoki and his forces retreated, the goddess forcibly teleported Makoto into the battlefield, where he faced Sofia and Mitsurugi. Overpowered, Hibiki's party also retreated with one of their members, Navarre Polar, sacrificing herself for their escape. Devastated by her companion's death, Hibiki swore to become stronger while Tomoki swears the same thing after lamenting his loss. Makoto, being in critical condition after his fight with Sofia and Mitsurugi, was being treated by Mio and Tomoe. Back to the present, Makoto and Shiki finally arrive at their destination.
| 16 | 4 | "Why Am I a Teacher!?"; Transliteration: "Boku ga Dōshite Sensei ni!?" (Japanese: 僕がどうして先生に！？) | Yoshihiro Mori | Kenta Ihara | Shinji Ishihira | January 29, 2024 |
Following the events of the Stellar Wars, Makoto and his companions, now at the Academy, face a new kind of challenge. Unexpectedly, Makoto finds himself appointed as a temporary instructor due to a misunderstanding involving the Academy's staff and his unique abilities. During his tenure, Makoto uses unconventional teaching methods to impart knowledge not just about magic and combat, but also lessons in understanding and cooperation among the diverse student body. Makoto's interactions with the students lead to unexpected insights into the political and social dynamics of the world he is trying to navigate.
| 17 | 5 | "The Lesson Will Now Begin"; Transliteration: "Soredeha Jugyō o Hajimemasu" (Japanese: それでは授業をはじめます) | Yoshiyuki Nogami, Momo Shimizu | Kenta Ihara | Shinji Ishihira | February 5, 2024 |
Makoto begins his job as a teacher and shows some of his skills to the students in order to evaluate their potential, most of them quit, but a few remain in awe of Makoto's powers, wishing to become stronger. Meanwhile, Mio begins a journey to become a better cook and Tomoe discovers that the lake recently formed during the Stellar Wars was a result of Makoto's battle with Sofia Bulger and Mitsurugi.
| 18 | 6 | "Becoming a Three-Star Chef"; Transliteration: "Mezase Mittsu-Boshi Shefu" (Japanese: めざせ三つ星シェフ) | Shigeru Ueda | Kenta Ihara | Shinji Ishihira | February 12, 2024 |
Makoto finally opens his new shop in Rotsgard and puts Eris and Aqua in charge of it. Tomoe is approached by Tomoki's group who attempts to force her to join his side, but fails, with Tomoe using illusion magic to cast him and his group back into the forest and warning them to never disrespect her again. Refusing to give up, Tomoki swears to take Tomoe for himself. Mio has an encounter with Hibiki and befriends her, agreeing to accompany her group and assist them while Hibiki gives her some cooking lessons.
| 19 | 7 | "New Member Audition"; Transliteration: "Shin Menbā Ōdishon" (Japanese: 新メンバーオーディション) | Yuusuke Onoda | Kenta Ihara | Shinji Ishihira | February 19, 2024 |
Makoto returns to the demiplane after hearing his new house has finished construction. Upon returning, the weather has gotten hot which Tomoe figures out is due to Makoto placing too many mist gates as he pleases. Elsewhere, Mio continues to learn more cooking techniques from Hibiki while keeping her true identity a secret. She asks Mio to accompany her to Limia to help the fate of the world, but Mio declines. Meanwhile, Makoto is tasked with interviewing new candidates to join the demiplane with Emma, allowing the Wingkin and Gorgons to join the demiplane.
| 20 | 8 | "The Notorious Beautiful Sisters"; Transliteration: "Warui Uwasa no Bijin Shimai" (Japanese: 悪い噂の美人姉妹) | Katsushi Sakurabi | Kenta Ihara | Shinji Ishihira | February 26, 2024 |
While the weather of the demiplane is sorted out by Tomoe, Makoto returns to his teaching position in Rotsgard and notices some new students for his lectures; Karen Force along with Sif and Yuno Rembrandt, the daughters he helped cure previously. Makoto has his regular students spar with a blue lizard while he duels against the new students. After the assessment, Makoto takes Karen aside and confronts that she is a demon, with Shiki mentioning he has known her as Rona from when he was a lich. Discussing further, Karen infiltrated the academy to look into the apparent human experimenting rumors, which Makoto has Lime searching into also. Late at night, Lime makes a discovery about the experiments while a shadowy figure looms in the background.
| 21 | 9 | "The Peverted Dragon"; Transliteration: "Hentai Doragon" (Japanese: 変態ドラゴン) | Yoshihiro Mori | Kenta Ihara | Shinji Ishihira | March 4, 2024 |
Lime has disappeared while investigating the human experimentation rumors. While in a prison cell with Eva the academy librarian, he remembers someone easily disarming himself before they were captured. Both escape the underground lair and relay their information for Makoto. While determining what to do next, the one who disarmed Lime appears and reveals himself to be a greater dragon Banshoku, but prefers the name Luto. Guildmaster of the adventurers, Luto explains he set up the leveling system based upon a human who was transported to the world hundreds of years ago. Taking his leave, Tomoe asks Luto further questions, which he responds that Makoto may become a superhuman capable of returning to his world on a whim, which he will be excited to witness.
| 22 | 10 | "Watch As I Improve The World"; Transliteration: "Yattemisemasu Yonaoshi Kagyō" (Japanese: やってみせます世直し稼業) | Yoshiyuki Nogami, Momo Shimizu | Kenta Ihara | Shinji Ishihira | March 11, 2024 |
After providing Makoto with the information regarding the human experimentations, Karen/Rona decides to leave the city and academy. Interrogating him about his part in the experiments, Bright-sensei divulges he began the experiments due to his hatred of the Goddess, wanting the demihumans to sacrifice as much as hyumans have. Before summer break, Makoto has his students perform combat practice with Zwei, a female blue lizard. Before they leave, his students request more training over the break, which Makoto accepts a once-weekly lesson. As a reward for saving her, Eva picks Makoto a book from the library. Before the summer is over, the students want to try and defeat a dragon. Though the attempts were solid, they fell short with Eris rescuing them per Makoto's orders to keep an eye on them.
| 23 | 11 | "Summer of Growth and New Skills"; Transliteration: "Seichō no Natsu, Shin Waza no Natsu" (Japanese: 成長の夏、新技の夏) | Kazunobu Shimizu | Kenta Ihara | Shinji Ishihira | March 18, 2024 |
Wanting to increase his mana output, Makoto asks Luta for help, which he lends a book on harnessing his ever-increasing mana levels. Eva also gives Makoto the book she picked out which is also one regarding mana techniques. Back in the demiplane, Makoto performs a mock battle against the wingkin and provides areas of improvement. After a few attempts, Makoto manages to manifest his mana into physical matter in the demiplane. The next day, the residents decide to show their strength with varying degree, and Mio presenting Makoto a "hero suit." Finally, Makoto shows off his new technique to the massive shock to everyone who witnessed it in action.
| 24 | 12 | "Attack of the Giant Monsters"; Transliteration: "Kyojū Shūrai" (Japanese: 巨獣襲来) | Shigeru Ueda | Kenta Ihara | Shinji Ishihira | March 25, 2024 |
While in the demiplane woods, one of the ogres is warned by giant beasts to not appear in the area again. Investigating alone, Makoto comes across a giant bear and a pack of wolves. Making arrangements to coexist, the wolves and bears agree to the terms, but Makoto would need to also talk with a giant eagle. Appearing later, the eagle agrees to the terms as guardians of the forest and takes the name "Roc Bird" before leaving. Meanwhile, Jin reminisces about his first love; Miranda, a girl whom he fought monsters with, until he saw her enjoyment of slaying a chimera and called her a monster. Determined to gain strength in order to apologize to her, Jin sets a goal to defeat a demidragon. Makoto makes arrangements as such, and the group manages to defeat it. Elsewhere, Miranda (now going by Sofia) remembers her defeating the chimera, but not before learning she was born due to Luto's experiments, and thinks about Jin before leaving with Lancer.
| 25 | 13 | "The Very Busy Academy Festival"; Transliteration: "Gakuensai wa Oisogashi" (Japanese: 学園祭は大忙し) | Katsushi Sakurabi | Kenta Ihara | Katsushi Sakurabi | April 1, 2024 |
The academy is soon hosting a festival for a week, which will help students look for work after they graduate. While working at the store, a temple priest insists Makoto teach them how they make their medicines in exchange for clearing up any false rumors on his business. Shiki accompanies him to the temple to show how they produce it, but the temple reasons they would not be able to handle mass production as it would cost too much. During the festival, Makoto is attacked by the assassin's guild from before, but puts an end to them effortlessly. Tomoe devises where a mist gate would help stabilize the climate in the demiplane while they all enjoy the festivities.
| 26 | 14 | "I'm Not a Fan of High Society"; Transliteration: "Shakō-kai wa Nigatedesu" (Japanese: 社交界は苦手です) | Yoshihiro Mori | Kenta Ihara | Shinji Ishihira | April 8, 2024 |
On the second night of the festival, Makoto reacquaints himself with Rembrandt's family and has a private conversation with a woman from the country Laurel; Sairitsu. She explains the characters on Makoto's shop are from their ancient dialect and want to know how he knows it, but Makoto manages to evade her questions. The next day, Luto joins Makoto, Tomoe, and Mio before slipping away to meet Princess Lilia. The two exchange conversations about Kuzunoha Trading with Luto imparting that she should not go up against Makoto and company since Lilia is already about to declare war. As the festival has a tournament to determine prestige among students, Makoto places extra restrictions on his students, but learns later some nobles have rigged the games before they begin.
| 27 | 15 | "A Fierce Tournament"; Transliteration: "Tougi Taikai, Nessen Amata" (Japanese: 闘技 大会, 熱戦 あまま) | Yoshiyuki Nogami, Momo Shimizu | Kenta Ihara | Yoshiyuki Nogami | April 15, 2024 |
The tournament begins with Makoto's students facing each other due to some meddling behind the scenes. Jin squares off against Ilumgand Hopley, whom has a grudge against Makoto from before, but easily defeats him. In the finals, Jin faces Shifu, but she defeats him with ease. Behind the scenes, Ilumgand looks forward to the team matches before looking at some mysterious drugs he has hidden. Makoto is later called away to the Merchants Guild regarding his purchases and transportation of his goods. Makoto attempts to dissuade the guild leader, but he fails to do so and is forced to close shop if he does not pay almost all of his profits. Consulting his followers, Makoto comes to a decision on what to do with all in agreement.
| 28 | 16 | "A Certain Student's Secret"; Transliteration: "Toaru Seito no Himitsu" (Japanese: とある 生徒 の 秘密) | Yūsuke Onoda | Kenta Ihara | Shinji Ishihira | April 22, 2024 |
As a child, Ilumgand promised a girl (Ruria) to be a noble to protect those under him, in the team finals for the tournament, he has used supplements and an amulet choker to enhance his abilities. In a flashback, Ilumgand attempted to reconnect with Ruria, but was rebuffed when his friends called her out for fleeing when her land was being razed by demons. Makoto and company recognize this, but cannot interfere in the match. After playing rock-paper-scissors, Yuno, Jin, and Izumo face off against Ilumgand's team. Even with the enhancements, the three easily dispatch the whole team. After the match, the amulet, revealed to be given to Ilumgand by Rona, starts to affect citizens of the city. Rona smiles and asks that Makoto not interfere with her plans to gather Princess Lilia and the Hopleys in the audience, while Makoto is visibly frustrated that he was taken for a fool again; this time by demons.
| 29 | 17 | "Mutation Hazard"; Transliteration: "Hen'i-tai Hazado" (Japanese: 変異体 ハザード) | Katsushi Sakurabi, Momo Shimizu | Kenta Ihara | Katsushi Sakurabi | April 29, 2024 |
With Ilumgand's and some townsfolk's transformation into monsters, Makoto asks Tomoe to teleport the nobles away while his students fend off Ilumgand with Shiki and Mio's guidance. Makoto runs into Rembrandt and his wife, and asks for assistance with the merchant's guild leader, Zara. With teamwork, the group manages to destroy Ilumgand's monstrous form. Elsewhere, Rona enacts her plan with Io to rid the world of hyumans.
| 30 | 18 | "Fall of the Academy City"; Transliteration: "Gakuentoshi no hōkai" (Japanese: 学園都市の崩壊) | Kazunobu Shimizu | Kenta Ihara | Toshinori Watanabe | May 6, 2024 |
In the wake of Ilumgand's defeat, Ruto and Tomoe discuss Makoto's intentions in their world, with Tomoe stating he has not made up his mind, but his abilities have fully blossomed. Makoto tasks Shiki and Mio to escort his students away, but Mio turns back to the stadium. Ilumgand, still in a live state, talks to Mio regarding his hopes and ideals before she kills him. Makoto sees his shop was destroyed after his merchandise and employees safely evacuated, but assists some folks in the red light district and receives thanks. In a bunker, Makoto learns that Rona was in cahoots with Bright-sensei's experiments and used that knowledge to make medicines and artifacts to create the monsters. He is later tasked with eliminating the monsters in the northeast section of town by the academy's headmaster, which is where the Merchant's Guild lies.
| 31 | 19 | "The Unruly Merchant"; Transliteration: "Abarenbō shōnin" (Japanese: 暴れん坊商人) | Yoshiyuki Nogami, Momo Shimizu | Kenta Ihara | Yoshiyuki Nogami | May 13, 2024 |
Makoto, Tomoe, Mio, and Shiki ensure the students are safe in the dorms while the mutants continue to rampage in Rotsgard. Before leaving to meet with Rembrandt and Zara, Makoto tasks his students with defending the dorms if necessary, but secretly asks Aqua and Eris to keep an eye on them as well. Defeating numerous mutants on the way, Makoto and company meet with Zara again and establish more friendly terms, including Zara's shock at how strong they claim to be. Leaving Tomoe to gather the remaining mutant changing accessories, Makoto has Shiki and Mio enter a contest with defeating the remaining mutants. Meanwhile, Rembrandt and Zara share their conflict on original ideals of trade versus new ones after meeting with Makoto. After help defeating the remaining mutants by Mondo and Lime, Makoto sees that Eris and Aqua added extra security to the dorms before departing to the affluent area of Rotsgard as the mutants seem to be migrating there. Meeting several nobles from Limia, Gritonia, and Laurel in their bunker, Makoto is found innocent of being a spy for the demons and is asked for assistance from the nobles.
| 32 | 20 | "The Utterly Hateable Good-for-Nothing"; Transliteration: "Nikumi kiremasu roku de nashi" (Japanese: 憎みきれますロクデナシ) | Yoshihiro Mori | Kenta Ihara | Shinji Ishihira | May 20, 2024 |
By the King of Limia and Princess Lily's request, Makoto has Tomoe send both to their respective countries using her teleportation and she returns to the subspace. While discussing the situation with Makoto, Shiki concludes that the main target of the demons is the heroine of Limia, who possesses a strong charisma that can rally allies behind her, unlike the hero of Gritonia, whose supporters were hypnotized. Their suspicions are confirmed when the Goddess summons both and orders Makoto to protect the heroine of Limia. Makoto refuses, still angry at the Goddess for her mistreatment, until Shiki convinces her to remove the curse she put on Makoto that prevents him from speaking human language in exchange for their cooperation. As the two are dispatched to Limia, Makoto orders Mio and Tomoe to conquer Stella Fortress as part of their plan to restore the Kingdom of Kaleneon and instate Eva and Ruria as its rulers, while establishing a portal there to stabilize the climate of the subspace. Excited with Makoto asking them to fight for him at last, Mio and Tomoe draft the High Orcs and Lizardmen from the subspace and begin the invasion of Stella Fortress.
| 33 | 21 | "The Heroes Fight Bravely"; Transliteration: "Yuusha funsen" (Japanese: 勇者奮戦) | Shigeru Ueda | Kenta Ihara | Shinji Ishihira | May 27, 2024 |
The forces of the demiplane easily rout the demon forces in Kaleneon, but Mio still continues a struggle against the demon general. Rona heads to Fort Stella when the Imperial Army arrives and Sofia engages Tomoki in battle. Sofia admits that she knows his healing factor only works at night and his magic eye is ineffective, leaving Tomoki and his friends unable to beat her. On the battlefield, Mitsurugi defeats numerous soldiers in order to regain his strength as a Greater Dragon. Tomoki convinces Mitsurugi to teleport his comrades away before using his greatest attack, but it proves ineffective to both Sofia or Mitsurugi. Seeing that Makoto is on his way to the capital, Sofia plans to kill him for her previous defeat. Makoto lands in Limia's capital, with Hibiki and her comrades about to retreat to Fort Stella, until Commander Io arrives to engage them in battle. Remembering Navarre's death, Hibiki swears to avenge her and fights Io, but is no match for him as he mercilessly beats Hibiki and plans to deliver the final blow until Makoto arrives in his Hero Suit that Mio made him previously and recognizes Hibiki from his previous world.
| 34 | 22 | "Fight On, Hero!"; Transliteration: "Tatakae Hii-roo!" (Japanese: 戦えヒーロー) | Yūsuke Onoda | Kenta Ihara | Shinji Ishihira | June 3, 2024 |
Makoto confirms to himself that the other hero is Hibiki; the person from his previous world while he resumes battle with Commander Io. Shiki reverts to his Lich self and asks to be called "Larva" to conceal their identities, and casts Hibiki's crew in a barrier to prevent themselves from getting hurt by Io. Makoto uses his hero suit's abilities that Mio installed on Io, but neither gain any advantage until Io uses a modified version of the Rose Sign that Navarre used to sacrifice herself. Putting Makoto in more danger, Hibiki continues to try and help, which "Larva" tasks her with defeating the barrier as a prerequisite. Though she fails with brute strength alone, Hibiki enters an astral plane which a deity will grant her a new power. Pondering, Hibiki decides to have an ability which will grant her more strength depending on her team's emotions of her. Defeating the barrier, Hibiki heads outside where the rest of the demons used their Rose Signs. Makoto soon breaks the Rose Sign on Io and nearly defeats him until Sofia crashes the battle and tears the Hero Suit off of Makoto, engaging him in a rematch.
| 35 | 23 | "Rival Revenge Match"; Transliteration: "Shukuteki ribenji matchi" (Japanese: 宿敵 りべンジ マッチ) | Yoshiyuki Nogami, Momo Shimizu | Kenta Ihara | Yoshiyuki Nogami | June 10, 2024 |
Rona rejoins Io and becomes relieved when Io reveals that, despite using the Rose Sign, he is out of danger because of Makoto's interference. Sofia attacks Makoto, but she is easily deflected by his mana armor. Io intervenes, and Makoto sends him flying. Rona decides to join the battle as well, but Makoto warns her that he will kill her if she does so. Rona then decides to comply with Makoto's demands and retreat, but Sofia combines the powers of the four dragons she absorbed to fight Makoto. Despite this, she fails to hit him. Even as she is being driven into a corner, Sofia refuses to give up and continues attacking. Meanwhile, Mitsurugi proceeds to kill Hibiki and her party, but Shiki intervenes, challenging him to a duel.
| 36 | 24 | "Sorcerer vs. Draconid"; Transliteration: "Majin vs. Ryujin" (Japanese: 魔人 VS. 竜人) | Katsushi Sakurabi | Kenta Ihara | Shinji Ishihira | June 17, 2024 |
Despite using all his power and even sacrificing many human soldiers including one of Hibiki's companions to strengthen himself, Mitsurugi is killed by Shiki, who parts ways with Hibiki after protecting her and saving one of her companions from a fatal wound. Mitsurugi's death makes all his remaining power be transferred to Sofia, who uses it to attack Makoto. Makoto decides to fight seriously and reveals that his true specialty is neither magic nor hand to hand combat, but archery, using his arrows to finally defeat her. With Hibiki and Limia in safety, Makoto completes his part of the deal with the Goddess by destroying Stella Fortress with one of his arrows. Shiki confirms with Makoto that he knows Hibiki, but Makoto affirms that he does not intend to meet her for the moment, while Hibiki deduces that Shiki is somehow involved with the Kuzunoha Company and intends to meet his master one day.
| 37 | 25 | "Party Beneath the Moonlight"; Transliteration: "Gekka Saien" (Japanese: 月下祭宴) | Kazunobu Shimizu | Kenta Ihara | Shinji Ishihira | June 24, 2024 |
Makoto returns home and learns that the demiplane army defeated the demons with no casualties at all, with Mio devouring the enemy general until his body recedes, now resembling a small lizard. Back to Rotsgard, Makoto's subordinates and students deal with the remaining mutants and help with the reconstruction. Makoto also meets the guild leader who recognizes his feats despite still considering him too inexpedient for a merchant and confesses to Ruto that he did not kill Sofia, leaving for him to deal with her at his own discretion. Ruto extracts the souls of all the dragons absorbed by Sofia but spares her, intending to use her for his plans. Despite lamenting the loss of Kaleneon, Rona rejoices that both Limia and Gritonia suffered heavy losses with their attack and begins planning her next move, also intending to invite Makoto for an audience with the Demon Lord. With all matters solved and the demiplane's climate balanced with all four seasons, Makoto and his subjects hold a party to celebrate. In the occasion, Makoto recognizes Tomoe, Mio and Shiki as members of his family and gives them his surname "Misumi".
