= List of Rent-A-Girlfriend episodes =

Rent-A-Girlfriend is an anime television series based on the manga series of the same name by Reiji Miyajima. A total of five seasons have been produced. The first season aired from July 11 to September 26, 2020, on the Super Animeism programming block on MBS, TBS, and other networks. (Note: MBS listed the series premiere at 25:25 on July 10, 2020, which is effectively July 11 at 1:25 a.m. JST.) A second season aired from July 2 to September 17, 2022. (Note: MBS and TBS listed the season premiere as airing on July 1 at 25:25, which is effectively July 2 at 1:25 a.m. JST.) A third season aired from July 8 to September 30, 2023. (Note: MBS listed the season premiere at 25:23 on July 7, 2023, which is effectively July 8 at 1:23 a.m. JST.) A fourth season aired from July 5 to September 20, 2025. (Note: Episodes were released on DMM TV, D Anime Store, and Crunchyroll four days before their televised airings.) (Note: MBS listed the season premiere at 26:23 on July 4, 2025, which is effectively July 5 at 2:23 a.m. JST.) A fifth season, which was originally intended to be the second cours of the previous season, aired from April 11 to June 27, 2026. (Note: Episodes were released on DMM TV and Crunchyroll three days before their televised airings.) (Note: MBS, TBS, and CBC listed the season premiere at 26:23 on April 10, 2026, which is effectively April 11 at 2:23 a.m. JST.) A sixth season has been announced.

== Series overview ==
Season	Episodes	Originally released	
Season	Episodes	First released	Last released
1	12	July 11, 2020	September 26, 2020
2	12	July 2, 2022	September 17, 2022
3	12	July 8, 2023	September 30, 2023
4	12	July 5, 2025	September 20, 2025
5	12	April 11, 2026	June 27, 2026

== Episodes ==
=== Season 1 (2020) ===
No. overall	No. in season	Title (Note: The ruby text glossed over the Japanese episode titles are merely character abbreviations and have no actual significance besides shortening the pronunciation. Despite being officially promoted as part of each title card, they do not appear in the episodes.)	Directed by	Written by	Storyboarded by	Original release date
1	1	"Rent-a-Girlfriend"; Transliteration: "Rentaru Kanojo" (Japanese: レンタル彼女(レンカノ))	Fumihiro Ueno	Mitsutaka Hirota	Kazuomi Koga	July 11, 2020
2	2	"Ex-Girlfriend and Girlfriend"; Transliteration: "Moto Kano to Kanojo" (Japanese: 元カノと彼女(モトカノ))	Takashi Tanasawa	Mitsutaka Hirota	Motoki Nakanishi	July 18, 2020
3	3	"Beach and Girlfriend"; Transliteration: "Umi to Kanojo" (Japanese: 海と彼女(ナツカノ))	Taku Yamada	Mitsutaka Hirota	Naoyuki Kuzuya	July 25, 2020
4	4	"Friends and Girlfriend"; Transliteration: "Tomodachi to Kanojo" (Japanese: 友達と彼女(マサカノ))	Akira Yamada	Mitsutaka Hirota	Masaki Ōzora	August 1, 2020
5	5	"Hot Springs and Girlfriend"; Transliteration: "Onsen to Kanojo" (Japanese: 温泉と彼女(イマカノ))	Taku Yamada	Fumi Tsubota	Naoyuki Kuzuya	August 8, 2020
6	6	"Girlfriend and Girlfriend"; Transliteration: "Kanojo to Kanojo" (Japanese: 彼女と彼女(カノカノ))	Shinya Une	Rie Uehara	Masaki Ōzora	August 15, 2020
7	7	"Provisional Girlfriend and Girlfriend"; Transliteration: "Kari Kano to Kanojo" (Japanese: 仮カノと彼女(カリカノ))	Kazuomi Koga	Mitsutaka Hirota	Naoyuki Kuzuya	August 22, 2020
8	8	"Christmas and Girlfriend"; Transliteration: "Kurisumasu to Kanojo" (Japanese: クリスマスと彼女(クリカノ))	Hidehiko Kadota	Fumi Tsubota	Naoyuki Kuzuya	August 29, 2020
9	9	"Lies and Girlfriend"; Transliteration: "Uso to Kanojo" (Japanese: 嘘と彼女(ウソカノ))	Naoyuki Kuzuya	Mitsutaka Hirota	Masaki Ōzora	September 5, 2020
10	10	"Friend's Girlfriend"; Transliteration: "Tomodachi no Kanojo" (Japanese: 友達の彼女(トモカノ))	Takashi Tanasawa & Yoshitsugu Kimura	Rie Uehara	Naoyuki Kuzuya	September 12, 2020
11	11	"Truth and Girlfriend"; Transliteration: "Shinjitsu to Kanojo" (Japanese: 真実と彼女(シンカノ))	Taku Yamada	Rie Uehara	Osamu Yamasaki	September 19, 2020
12	12	"Confession and Girlfriend"; Transliteration: "Kokuhaku to Kanojo" (Japanese: 告白と彼女(コクカノ))	Kazuomi Koga	Mitsutaka Hirota	Kazuomi Koga	September 26, 2020

=== Season 2 (2022) ===
No. overall	No. in season	Title	Directed by	Written by	Storyboarded by	Original release date
13	1	"Dream and Girlfriend"; Transliteration: "Yume to Kanojo" (Japanese: 夢と彼女(ユメカノ))	Kazuomi Koga	Mitsutaka Hirota	Kazuomi Koga	July 2, 2022
14	2	"The Usual Girlfriend"; Transliteration: "Itsumo no Kanojo" (Japanese: いつもの彼女(オフカノ))	Kyōhei Suzuki	Mitsutaka Hirota	Kyōhei Suzuki	July 9, 2022 (Note: This episode aired at 1:45 a.m. JST, 20 minutes after the regular air time.)
15	3	"The Return of the Girlfriend"; Transliteration: "Sairai no Kanojo" (Japanese: 再来の彼女(サイカノ))	Yoshitsugu Kimura	Rie Uehara	Naoyuki Kuzuya	July 16, 2022
16	4	"Night and Girlfriend"; Transliteration: "Yoru to Kanojo" (Japanese: 夜と彼女(バンカノ))	Fumio Maezono	Rie Uehara	Naoyuki Kuzuya	July 23, 2022 (Note: This episode aired at 1:30 a.m. JST, 5 minutes after the regular air time.)
17	5	"Birthday and Girlfriend"; Transliteration: "Tanjōbi to Kanojo" (Japanese: 誕生日と彼女(バーカノ))	Shinya Une	Rie Uehara	Shinya Une	July 30, 2022
18	6	"Booze and Girlfriend"; Transliteration: "Sake to Kanojo" (Japanese: 酒と彼女(エンカノ))	Yūki Morita	Mitsutaka Hirota	Masaki Ōzora	August 6, 2022
19	7	"Ex and Girlfriend"; Transliteration: "Moto Kano to Kanojo" (Japanese: 元カノとカノジョ(トリカノ))	Ken Andō & Fumio Maezono	Rie Uehara	Naoyuki Kuzuya	August 13, 2022
20	8	"Youth and Girlfriend"; Transliteration: "Seishun to Kanojo" (Japanese: 青春と彼女(コスカノ))	Mizuki Iwadare	Rie Uehara	Kazuomi Koga	August 20, 2022
21	9	"Kiss and Girlfriend"; Transliteration: "Kisu to Kanojo" (Japanese: キスと彼女(ジッカノ))	Yurika Fukaya	Fumi Tsubota	Yurika Fukaya	August 27, 2022
22	10	"Ring and Girlfriend"; Transliteration: "Yubiwa to Kanojo" (Japanese: 指輪と彼女(リンカノ))	Shūto Yamanaka, Shinya Une & Yurika Fukaya	Fumi Tsubota	Naoyuki Kuzuya	September 3, 2022
23	11	"Guide and Girlfriend"; Transliteration: "Omotenashi to Kanojo" (Japanese: お饗しと彼女(モテカノ))	Fumio Maezono	Fumi Tsubota	Masaki Ōzora	September 10, 2022
24	12	"Girlfriend and Me"; Transliteration: "Kanojo to Ore" (Japanese: 彼女と俺(イツカノ))	Kazuomi Koga	Mitsutaka Hirota	Kazuomi Koga	September 17, 2022

=== Season 3 (2023) ===
No. overall	No. in season	Title	Directed by	Written by	Storyboarded by	Original release date
25	1	"Home Cooking and Girlfriend"; Transliteration: "Teryōri to Kanojo" (Japanese: 手料理と彼女(オムカノ))	Shinya Une	Mitsutaka Hirota	Shinya Une	July 8, 2023
26	2	"Girlfriend Next Door"; Transliteration: "Rinshitsu no Kanojo" (Japanese: 隣室の彼女(トナカノ))	Akira Mano	Mitsutaka Hirota	Shinya Une	July 15, 2023 (Note: This episode aired at 1:38 a.m. JST, 15 minutes after the regular air time.)
27	3	"Expert and Girlfriend"; Transliteration: "Keikensha to Kanojo" (Japanese: 経験者と彼女(サクカノ))	Kyōhei Suzuki	Mitsutaka Hirota	Yumeko Iwaoka	July 22, 2023
28	4	"D-Day and Girlfriend"; Transliteration: "Saishūbi to Kanojo" (Japanese: 最終日と彼女(ギリカノ))	Taiki Nishimura	Mitsutaka Hirota	Koichi Ohata	July 29, 2023
29	5	"Filming and Girlfriend"; Transliteration: "Satsuei to Kanojo" (Japanese: 撮影と彼女(エイガノ))	Yorihide Mada	Rie Uehara	Tetsuji Takayanagi	August 5, 2023
30	6	"Final Scene and Girlfriend"; Transliteration: "Rasuto Shīn to Kanojo" (Japanese: ラストシーンと彼女(ラスカノ))	Akira Mano	Mitsutaka Hirota	Koichi Ohata	August 12, 2023 (Note: This episode aired at 1:28 a.m. JST, 5 minutes after the regular air time.)
31	7	"Kazuya and Girlfriend"; Transliteration: "Kazuya to Kanojo" (Japanese: 和也と彼女(ナマカノ))	Kyōhei Suzuki & Naoyuki Kuzuya	Rie Uehara	Kyōhei Suzuki	August 19, 2023
32	8	"Family and Girlfriend"; Transliteration: "Kazoku to Kanojo" (Japanese: 家族と彼女(ツミカノ))	Hidehiko Kadota	Rie Uehara	Masaki Ōzora	September 2, 2023 (Note: Episode 32 was delayed a week from its originally scheduled air date of August 26, 2023.)
33	9	"Parting and Girlfriend"; Transliteration: "Owakare to Kanojo" (Japanese: お別れと彼女(セイカノ))	Akira Mano	Mitsutaka Hirota	Masaki Ōzora	September 9, 2023
34	10	"Spontaneous Trip and Girlfriend"; Transliteration: "Toppatsu Ryokō to Kanojo" (Japanese: 突発旅行と彼女(トツカノ))	Hisaya Takabayashi	Rie Uehara	Tetsuji Takayanagi	September 16, 2023
35	11	"Girlfriend and Boyfriend"; Transliteration: "Kanojo to Kareshi" (Japanese: 彼女と彼氏(カノカレ))	Akira Mano	Mitsutaka Hirota	Koichi Ohata	September 23, 2023
36	12	"Ideal Girlfriend and Girlfriend"; Transliteration: "Risō no Kanojo to Kanojo" (Japanese: 理想の彼女と彼女(カレカノ))	Shinya Une	Mitsutaka Hirota	Shinya Une	September 30, 2023 (Note: This episode aired at 1:43 a.m. JST, 20 minutes after the regular air time.)

=== Season 4 (2025) ===
No. overall	No. in season	Title	Directed by	Written by	Storyboarded by	Original release date
37	1	"Routine and Girlfriend"; Transliteration: "Nichijō to Kanojo" (Japanese: 日常と彼女(ニッカノ))	Kazuomi Koga	Mitsutaka Hirota	Kazuomi Koga	July 5, 2025
38	2	"Sigh and Girlfriend"; Transliteration: "Tameiki to Kanojo" (Japanese: 溜め息と彼女(タメカノ))	Akiko Nakano	Mitsutaka Hirota	Kenichi Kasai	July 12, 2025
39	3	"Daikanyama and Girlfriend"; Transliteration: "Daikanyama to Kanojo" (Japanese: 代官山と彼女(ダイカノ))	Akiko Nakano	Mitsutaka Hirota	Shinya Une	July 19, 2025
40	4	"Decision and Girlfriend"; Transliteration: "Ketsui to Kanojo" (Japanese: 決意と彼女(キメカノ))	Marie Koizumi	Rie Uehara	Hiroshi Matsuzono	July 26, 2025
41	5	"Promised Time and Girlfriend"; Transliteration: "Sonotoki to Kanojo" (Japanese: その時と彼女(バッカノ))	Hiroshi Kimura	Rie Uehara	Susumu Nishizawa	August 2, 2025
42	6	"Family Trip and Girlfriend"; Transliteration: "Kazoku Ryokō to Kanojo" (Japanese: 家族旅行と彼女(タビカノ))	Hidehiko Kadota	Mitsutaka Hirota	Hiroshi Matsuzono	August 9, 2025
43	7	"Hawaiians and Girlfriend"; Transliteration: "Hawaianzu to Kanojo" (Japanese: ハワイアンズと彼女(ハワカノ))	Akiko Nakano	Rie Uehara	Hiroshi Matsuzono	August 16, 2025
44	8	"Strings and Girlfriend"; Transliteration: "Himo to Kanojo" (Japanese: 紐と彼女(ポロカノ))	Marie Koizumi	Mitsutaka Hirota	Daigo Kinoshita	August 23, 2025 (Note: This episode aired at 2:28 a.m. JST, 5 minutes after the regular air time.)
45	9	"For My First Time and Girlfriend"; Transliteration: "Hajimete no Kinen to Kanojo" (Japanese: 初めて記念と彼女(ハツカノ))	Hiroshi Kimura	Rie Uehara	Hiroshi Matsuzono	August 30, 2025 (Note: This episode aired at 3:28 a.m. JST, 1 hour and 5 minutes after the regular air time.)
46	10	"Ring Finger and Girlfriend"; Transliteration: "Kusuriyubi to Kanojo" (Japanese: 薬指と彼女(ユビカノ))	Akiko Nakano	Rie Uehara	Hiroshi Matsuzono	September 6, 2025
47	11	"Guilt and Girlfriend"; Transliteration: "Zaiakukan to Kanojo" (Japanese: 罪悪感と彼女(ギルカノ))	Marie Koizumi	Mitsutaka Hirota	Daigo Kinoshita	September 13, 2025
48	12	"Paradise and Girlfriend"; Transliteration: "Rakuen to Kanojo" (Japanese: 楽園と彼女(ケッカノ))	Akiko Nakano	Mitsutaka Hirota	Shinya Une	September 20, 2025

=== Season 5 (2026) ===
No. overall	No. in season	Title	Directed by	Written by	Storyboarded by	Original release date
49	1	"Ex-Girlfriend, Nanami Mami"; Transliteration: "Moto Kano, Nanami Mami" (Japanese: 元カノ、七海麻美(マエカノ))	Akira Mano	Mitsutaka Hirota	Hiroshi Matsuzono	April 11, 2026
50	2	"Rental Girlfriend"; Transliteration: "Rentaru no Kanojo" (Japanese: レンタルの彼女(カリカノ))	Hiroshi Kimura	Mitsutaka Hirota	Hiroshi Kimura & Aleksei Iatsutko	April 18, 2026
51	3	"The End of the Girlfriend"; Transliteration: "Owari no Kanojo" (Japanese: 終わりの彼女(オワカノ))	Akiko Nakano	Rie Uehara	Hiroshi Matsuzono	April 25, 2026
52	4	"Climax and Girlfriend"; Transliteration: "Kuraimakkusu to Kanojo" (Japanese: クライマックスと彼女(クラカノ))	Akiko Nakano	Mitsutaka Hirota	Kazuomi Koga	May 2, 2026
53	5	"Legitimate Girlfriend"; Transliteration: "Shōshinshōmei no Kanojo" (Japanese: 正真正銘の彼女(ガチカノ))	Marie Koizumi	Rie Uehara	Daigo Kinoshita	May 9, 2026
54	6	"Long Time No Girlfriend"; Transliteration: "Hisashiburi no Kanojo" (Japanese: 久しぶりの彼女(ヒサカノ))	Akiko Nakano	Mitsutaka Hirota	Hiroshi Matsuzono	May 16, 2026
55	7	"Valentine's and Girlfriend"; Transliteration: "Barentain to Kanojo" (Japanese: バレンタインと彼女(バレカノ))	Hiroshi Kimura	Rie Uehara	Hiroshi Matsuzono	May 23, 2026
56	8	"Investigation and Girlfriend"; Transliteration: "Chōsa to Kanojo" (Japanese: 調査と彼女(ウサカノ))	Marie Koizumi & Ryōko Takemura	Mitsutaka Hirota	Daigo Kinoshita	May 30, 2026
57	9	"Bra and Girlfriend"; Transliteration: "Bura to Kanojo" (Japanese: ブラと彼女(ブラカノ))	Akira Mano	Rie Uehara	Hiroshi Matsuzono	June 6, 2026
58	10	"Childhood Home and Girlfriend"; Transliteration: "Sodatta Ie to Kanojo" (Japanese: 育った家と彼女(イクカノ))	Hiroshi Kimura	Mitsutaka Hirota	Hiroshi Kimura	June 13, 2026
59	11	"Moving and Girlfriend"; Transliteration: "Hikkoshi to Kanojo" (Japanese: 引っ越しと彼女(コシカノ))	Akiko Nakano	Rie Uehara	Daigo Kinoshita	June 20, 2026
60	12	"Loneliness and Girlfriend"; Transliteration: "Sabishisa to Kanojo" (Japanese: 寂しさと彼女(サビカノ))	Akiko Nakano	Mitsutaka Hirota	Hiroshi Matsuzono	June 27, 2026
