= From stability to prosperity =

From stability to prosperity (Chinese: 由治及興) is a neologism coined by Xi Jinping and the government of Hong Kong in 2022 after the pass of the national security law. The term was first mentioned in the 20th National Congress of the Chinese Communist Party, in which Xi stated that the national security law ensured the stability of Hong Kong, and now it is on their way to prosperity from stability. In 2023, John Lee Ka-chiu stated that it was the first year of "From stability to prosperity".

On 23 April 2023, a netizen posted a thread on LIHKG complaining about the situation in Hong Kong at the time and asked whether something big would happen. A pro-Beijing netizen with the name "Chizuru Mizuhara" (水原千鶴), replied that the poster is too pessimistic and they have seen the benefits from stability to prosperity (咁係因為你悲觀，我睇到由治及興帶嚟嘅好處). The thread quickly went viral after the reply and was closed on 7 December 2023 due to the volume of responses. It later became an Internet meme in Hong Kong.

Various reasons have been proposed for its virality. One is the scepticism among netizens toward the term when comparing it with real-life conditions in Hong Kong. Another reason proposed was the style of Chizuru Mizuhara's response, which claimed the situation is getting better without explanation, which was described as "hilarious" by a reporter from HK01. Some have also suggested that the popularity of Rent-A-Girlfriend in Hong Kong, in which Chizuru Mizuhara is the heroine, contributed to the meme's rapid spread.
