= Rent-A-Girlfriend =

Japanese manga series

- First tankōbon volume cover of Rent-A-Girlfriend, featuring Chizuru Mizuhara

彼女、お借りします (Kanojo, Okarishimasu)
- Genre: Harem; Romantic comedy
- Manga
- Written by: Reiji Miyajima
- Published by: Kodansha
- English publisher: NA: Kodansha USA
- Imprint: Shōnen Magazine Comics
- Magazine: Weekly Shōnen Magazine
- Original run: July 12, 2017 – present
- Volumes: 48
- Manga

Rent-A-(Really Shy!)-Girlfriend
- Written by: Reiji Miyajima
- Published by: Kodansha
- English publisher: NA: Kodansha USA
- Magazine: Magazine Pocket
- Original run: June 21, 2020 – present
- Volumes: 3
- Television drama

Rental A Girlfriend
- Directed by: Daisuke Yamamoto
- Written by: Kumiko Asō
- Music by: Yuki Munakata
- Licensed by: Rakuten Viki
- Original network: ABC TV, TV Asahi
- Original run: July 3, 2022 – September 25, 2022
- Episodes: 10
- Video game

Rent-A-Girlfriend: The Horizon and the Girl in the Swimsuit
- Developer: Mages
- Publisher: Mages
- Genre: Visual novel
- Platform: PlayStation 4; Nintendo Switch
- Released: JP: November 28, 2024
- Anime television series
- Rent-A-Girlfriend (2020–present)
- icon

Rent-A-Girlfriend (Japanese: 彼女、お借りします, Hepburn: Kanojo, Okarishimasu), abbreviated in Japan as Kanokari (かのかり), is a Japanese manga series written and illustrated by Reiji Miyajima. It has been serialized in Kodansha's Weekly Shōnen Magazine since July 2017, and has been compiled into forty-eight tankōbon volumes as of November 2026. The series is licensed in North America by Kodansha USA, which released the first volume in English in June 2020.

The series follows a young college student living in Tokyo who decides to rent a girlfriend following a sudden and painful breakup with his ex-girlfriend. After a while, he legitimately falls in love with his rental girlfriend and is determined to turn their fake relationship into a real one.

An anime television series adaptation was produced by TMS Entertainment. Five seasons aired on MBS and its affiliates under the Super Animeism programming block from July 2020 to June 2026. A sixth season has been announced. A live-action television drama adaptation also aired from July to September 2022.

By October 2026, the manga had over 16 million copies in circulation.

== Plot ==
Kazuya Kinoshita is dumped by his girlfriend Mami Nanami after dating for a month. He decides to rent a beautiful girlfriend named Chizuru Mizuhara. However, because he thinks she was inauthentic, he gives her a low rating. When Chizuru berates him for that during their next outing, he realizes she is more intense than he expected. Just then, Kazuya learns that his grandmother has been hospitalized following a collapse. Chizuru comes along and his grandmother is smitten by how great she is. Kazuya continues renting Chizuru in order to keep up appearances with his family and friends, but things get complicated when they discover they are next-door apartment neighbors and attend the same college. Later, other girls from the rental girlfriend business also join in, along with Kazuya's ex-girlfriend, who seems intent on ending this fake relationship. However, as Kazuya falls in love with Chizuru, he becomes determined to do whatever he can to make their rental relationship into a real one.

== Media ==
=== Manga ===
Written and illustrated by Reiji Miyajima, the series began serialization in Kodansha's Weekly Shōnen Magazine on July 12, 2017. It has been compiled into forty-eight volumes as of November 2026. The series is licensed in North America by Kodansha USA, which released the first volume in English on June 2, 2020. Kodansha published an anthology of the series on August 17, 2020.

A spin-off manga series, titled Rent-A-(Really Shy!)-Girlfriend (彼女、人見知ります, Kanojo, Hitomishirimasu), also written and illustrated by Miyajima, has been serialized in Kodansha's Magazine Pocket app since June 21, 2020. The series focuses on the character Sumi Sakurasawa. It has been compiled into three volumes as of May 2022. The series is also published in North America by Kodansha USA.

=== Anime ===
An anime television series adaptation was announced in December 2019. The series was animated by TMS Entertainment and directed by Kazuomi Koga, with Mitsutaka Hirota handling series composition, Kanna Hirayama designing the characters, and Hyadain composing the music. The Peggies performed the opening theme "Centimeter" (センチメートル, Senchimētoru). Halca performed the first ending theme "Kokuhaku Bungee Jump" (告白バンジージャンプ; "Confession Bungee Jump") starting from Episodes 2–6 and 8–11, (Note: "Kokuhaku Bungee Jump" is used as an insert song in episode 12.) while Halca also performed the second ending theme "First Drop" for Episode 7, (Note: "First Drop" by Halca is heard during the end credits of Episode 7.) and Sora Amamiya performed the third ending theme "Kimi wo Tousite" (君を通して; "Through You") for Episode 12. It aired from July 11 to September 26, 2020, on the Super Animeism programming block on MBS, TBS, and their affiliates. (Note: MBS and TBS listed the series premiere at 25:25 on July 10, 2020, which is effectively July 11 at 1:25 a.m. JST.) The first season ran for 12 episodes.

Crunchyroll streamed the series outside of Asia. On August 11, 2020, Crunchyroll announced that the series would receive an English dub, which premiered on August 28. In Southeast Asia and South Asia, the series is licensed by Muse Communication and released on the streaming service iQIYI in Southeast Asia. Animax Asia later began airing the series.

In September 2020, shortly before the first season's finale was streamed internationally, it was announced that a second season had been greenlit for production. The main cast and staff reprised their roles, with Studio Comet cooperating in the production. The second season aired from July 2 to September 17, 2022. (Note: MBS and TBS listed the season premiere at 25:25 on July 1, 2022, which is effectively July 2 at 1:25 a.m. JST.) The opening theme is "Himitsu Koi-Gokoro" (ヒミツ恋ゴコロ; "Secret Love Heart") by CHiCO with HoneyWorks, while the ending theme is "Ienai" (言えない; "Can't Say") by MIMiNARI featuring asmi.

On May 18, 2021, it was announced Sentai Filmworks picked up the home video rights.

After the final episode of the second season, a third season was announced, with Shinya Une replacing Kazuomi Koga as director. It aired from July 8 to September 30, 2023. (Note: MBS listed the season premiere at 25:23 on July 7, 2023, which is effectively July 8 at 1:23 a.m. JST.) The opening theme is "Renai Miri Film" (恋愛ミリフィルム; "Love Millimeter Film") by Halca. (Note: "Renai Miri Film" is used as an insert song in episode 48.) Amber's performed the first ending theme "End Roll" (エンドロール) from Episodes 25–31 and 34–36, and the second ending theme "End Roll (Ballad Version)" (エンドロール (Ballad Version)) from Episodes 32–33. (Note: "End Roll (Ballad Version)" is heard during the end credits of Episodes 32 and 33.)

In July 2024, a fourth season was announced. The staff and cast from the previous seasons once again reprised their roles, with Kazuomi Koga returning as director. Originally scheduled to be released in two split cours, the fourth season ended up being released as a single cours, airing from July 5 to September 20, 2025, on the Animeism programming block on MBS, TBS, CBC Television, RKB, HBC, BS-TBS, and AT-X. (Note: MBS, TBS, and CBC listed the season premiere at 26:23 on July 4, 2025, which is effectively July 5 at 2:23 a.m. JST.) (Note: Episodes were released on DMM TV, D Anime Store, and Crunchyroll four days before their televised airings.) The opening theme song is "Umitsuki" performed by ClariS, while the ending theme song is "Boku no Vega" (ぼくのベガ; "My Vega") performed by Regal Lily.

A fifth season, which was originally intended to be the second cours of the previous season, aired from April 11 to June 27, 2026. (Note: MBS, TBS, and CBC listed the season premiere at 26:23 on April 10, 2026, which is effectively April 11 at 2:23 a.m. JST.) (Note: Episodes were released on DMM TV and Crunchyroll three days before their televised airings.) The opening theme song is "Non Scenario Etude" (ノンシナリオ・エチュード) performed by Sora Amamiya, while the ending theme song is "204-gōshitsu" (204号室; "Room 204") performed by Nakigoto. For the ending of episode 52, an acoustic version of "Boku no Vega" was used.

Following the airing of the final episode of the fifth season, a sixth season was announced.

=== Video games ===
A crossover smartphone game titled Kanojo, Okarishimasu Heroine All-Stars (彼女、お借りしますヒロインオールスターズ) was developed by Enish. It featured Chizuru, Mami, Ruka, and Sumi along with female characters from other Weekly Shōnen Magazine manga series like Fairy Tail, The Seven Deadly Sins, Domestic Girlfriend, Girlfriend, Girlfriend, Fire Force, Yamada-kun and the Seven Witches, and Negima! Magister Negi Magi. It was released on September 2, 2021. The game's service ended on January 25, 2023.

A visual novel, titled Rent-A-Girlfriend: The Horizon and the Girl in the Swimsuit (彼女、お借りします ～水平線と水着の彼女～), developed by Mages, was announced in July 2024. The game follows an original story, which is an alternate scenario set during the third season of the anime, and features all main characters. The main cast from the anime reprised their roles in the game. It was released in Japan for PlayStation 4 and Nintendo Switch on November 28, 2024. The limited edition of the game is bundled with a four-disc drama CD and an original soundtrack album, featuring over 30 tracks, including the game's theme song "Cider no Mukō" (サイダーの向こう; "Beyond the Cider") by Sora Amamiya, Aoi Yūki, Nao Tōyama, Rie Takahashi, and Yū Serizawa.

=== Drama ===
A live-action television drama adaptation aired on ABC and TV Asahi from July 3 to September 25, 2022. It stars Ryusei Onishi and Hiyori Sakurada as Kazuya and Chizuru, respectively. Rakuten Viki began streaming the series on January 27, 2023, under the title Rental A Girlfriend.

== Reception ==
=== Popularity and sales ===
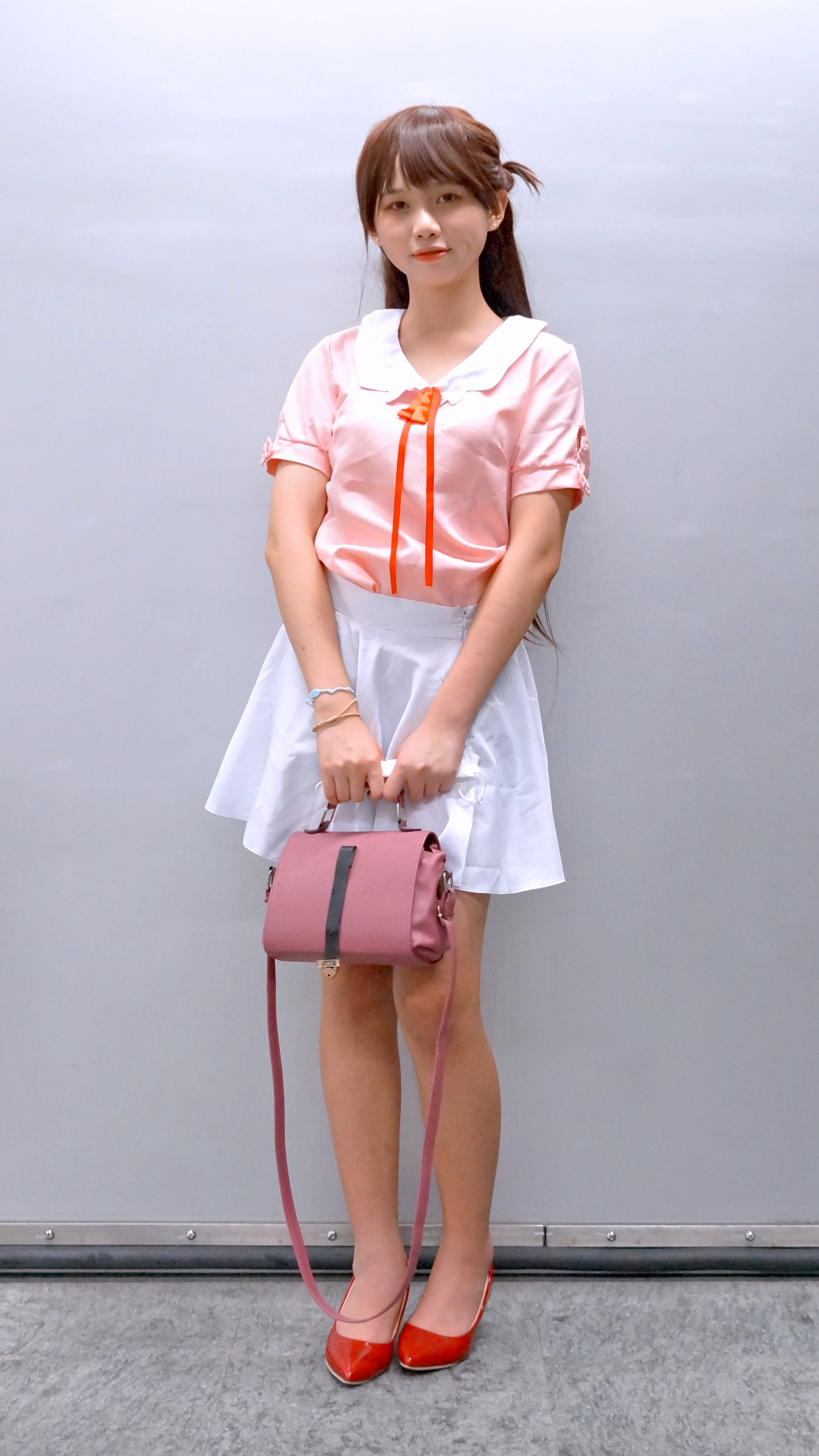
A cosplayer dressed as Chizuru Mizuhara in 2022

By February 2018, the manga had over 150,000 copies in circulation; it had over 1 million copies in circulation by February 2019; it had over 5 million copies in circulation by August 2020; it had over 10 million in circulation by December 2021; it had over 11 million copies in circulation by July 2023; it had over 13 million copies in circulation by March 2024; it had over 13.5 million copies in circulation by April 2025; it had over 14 million copies in circulation by September 2025; it had over 15 million copies in circulation by January 2026; and it had over 16 million copies in circulation by October 2026.

A collaboration between Rent-A-Girlfriend and Tokyo Dome City was held from June 25 to July 2, 2023. A second collaboration was held from November 21 to December 28, 2025.

In May 2024, K Manga announced on its first anniversary that the series was the best selling and fourth most read manga on the app.

On December 8, 2024, the city of Nakano, Reiji Miyajima's hometown, held the Nakano Kanokari Festival to promote the manga. On May 30, 2025, the city of Nakano announced a collaboration for the Shinshu Nakano Rose Festival on June 15. On October 30, the city of Nakano announced the second Nakano Kanokari Festival. It was held on November 9. On December 18, the city of Nakano announced the official online store of the Reiji Miyajima Support Committee. On May 26, 2026, the second collaboration for the Shinshu Nakano Rose Festival was announced for May 26 and 27, May 29 to June 2, June 4 to 9, and June 11 to 14.

On May 14, 2025, an X account was created for the character of Ruka Sarashina. On May 29, a crowdfunding campaign was launched on Campfire for a project celebrating Ruka's birthday. Once crowdfunding officially started on June 5, it was announced that the project successfully reached its goal of 10,000,000 yen in 12 minutes and became number 1 in the Campfire rankings. The project received a total of 29,265,498 yen once the campaign ended on July 31. On December 19, the campaign won the Fan Community Award in the Pop Culture category for Best Project of the Second Half of the Year at the Campfire Crowdfunding Awards 2025.

A collaboration between Rent-A-Girlfriend and Spa Resort Hawaiians, which celebrated the 60th anniversary of the resort, was held from September 13 to November 30, 2025. Sora Amamiya and Masayuki Akasaka, Kibe's Japanese voice actor, appeared at a special event to commemorate the collaboration on October 19. Yū Serizawa, Mini's Japanese voice actress, also promoted the collaboration on November 23. Spa Resort Hawaiians promoted the fourth and fifth seasons of the anime adaptation.

A collaboration between Rent-A-Girlfriend and Yo-kai Watch: Wibble Wobble was held from August 17 to August 31, 2026.

A collaboration between Rent-A-Girlfriend and Toonique Universe Point in Seoul, South Korea was held from August 20 to September 13, 2026.
