= Kanna Hirayama =

Japanese animator and illustrator

- 平山寛菜
- Born: September 19, 1995 (age 30); Kumamoto Prefecture, Japan
- Occupations: animator, illustrator, character designer
- Known for: Rent-A-Girlfriend,Selection Project, ja:超アイドル伝説大森杏子, Oshi no Ko

Kanna Hirayama (平山寛菜, Hirayama Kanna; born September 19, 1995) is a Japanese animator, illustrator, and character designer. She is from Kumamoto Prefecture. She also works under the alias Kappe (カッペ) as an illustrator.

== Biography ==
In 2018, through crowdfunding on CAMPFIRE, she worked on character design for the short anime Super Idol Legend Omori Kyouko, produced by Diverge × Fukushima Gainax (now Gainax), where she also worked as the sole animator for the main animation.

In 2019, she worked on prop design for Given, and in 2020, she was responsible for prop design, character design, and overall animation direction for Rent-A-Girlfriend. She also served as the sole animation director for the opening and ending scenes and won the "Best in Character Design" award at the 7th Anime Trending Awards.

In 2021, she worked on the character design from the concept stage for Selection Project.

In 2023, she designed the characters for Oshi no Ko and was nominated for "Best Character Design" at the 8th Crunchyroll Anime Awards. Additionally, she won "Best Character Design" at the 10th *Anime Trending Awards*.

== Personal life ==
=== Industry recognition ===
Regarding her work on Rent-A-Girlfriend, director Kazuo Koga mentioned in an interview that the character designs by kappe were so well-received that they immediately became the favorite of the original author Reiji Miyajima during the competition.

Daisuke Hiramaki, the director of Selection Project, commented in an interview that "Her rise in the industry has been incredibly fast (laughs)." Producer Ryo Kobayashi mentioned, "Hirayama-san was saying she wanted to do character design right from the beginning. Most people would wait until they built up experience, but she was already saying it from the start (laughs). So, we knew she was serious about character design. Of course, she's skilled at drawing, but she also knows how to promote herself." In fact, Hirayama herself shared in the same interview that her character design work for *Rent-A-Girlfriend* was confirmed in her third year as an animator.

== Works contributed to ==
=== Television anime ===
==== 2017 ====
- Is It Wrong to Try to Pick Up Girls in a Dungeon? Sword Oratoria (key animation, episode 2)
- Eromanga Sensei (key animation, episodes 8, 9, 11)
- Battle Girl High School (key animation, episodes 2, 6)
- Sagrada Reset (key animation, episodes 15, 24)
- Gamers! (animation director Assist, episodes 5, 6, 7, 9, 11; key animation, episodes 1, 5, 6, 9, 11)
- NEW GAME!! (Season 2) (key animation, episodes 2, 4, 8, 11)
- Made in Abyss (key animation, episode 12)
- The Ancient Magus' Bride (key animation, episode 2)
- Hozuki's Coolheadedness (Season 2) (animation director, episode 19; key animation, episodes 1, 3, 4)
- Himouto! Umaru-chan R (Season 2) (key animation, episode 5)
- Blend S (key animation, episodes 4, 10, 11)
- Just Because! (chief animation director, episodes 8, 11; assistant chief animation director, episode 5; animation director, episodes 9, 12; key animation, episodes 1, 2, 5, 6, 7, 8, 10)
- Idolmaster SideM (assistant animation director, episodes 3, 8)

==== 2018 ====
- Slow Start (key animation, episodes 2, 12)
- The Ryuo's Work Is Never Done! (key animation, episode 4)
- The Seven Deadly Sins: Revival of the Commandments (key animation, episode 7)
- After the Rain (key animation, episode 12)
- Sword Art Online Alternative: Gun Gale Online (opening key animation)
- It's Difficult to Love an Otaku (opening key animation, key animation, episodes 1, 3)
- Tada Never Falls in Love (key animation, episode 5)
- Yuuna and the Haunted Hot Springs (key animation, episode 4)
- Seven Mortal Sins (key animation, episodes 5–12; opening key animation, episodes 1–12)
- Layton's Mystery Journey: Katrielle and the Millionaire's Conspiracy (animation director, episode 40; key animation, episodes 26, 40)
- Our Maid is Annoying (animation director, episodes 3, 5, 7, 9, 10; key animation, episode 1)
- Bloom Into You (animation director, key animation, episode 5)
- Goblin Slayer (assistant animation director, episode 5)
- RELEASE THE SPYCE (animation director, key animation, episode 6)
- Sword Art Online: Alicization (key animation, episodes 8, 24)

==== 2019 ====
- The Promised Neverland (key animation, episode 7)
- The Housekeeper and the Professor (animation director, episode 11; key animation, episode 11)
- The Angel Who Fell from Heaven! (key animation, episode 12)
- MIX (opening key animation)
- Gonjiro (opening key animation)
- The Rising of the Shield Hero (ending key animation)
- The Caretaking Fox Senko-san (key animation, episode 1)
- Ensemble Stars! (opening, opening 2 key animation)
- Astra Lost in Space (opening, episode 1 key animation)
- Given (prop design, opening key animation)
- Dumbbell Nan Kilo Moteru? (animation director, episode 2; opening key animation)
- The Demon Lord Retry! (key animation, episode 3)
- High School Prodigies Have It Easy Even in Another World (key animation, episode 1)
- Fate/Grand Order - Absolute Demon Sea Front Babylon (key animation, episode 3)
- Radiant (opening key animation)
- Azur Lane (opening key animation)
- Cautious Hero: The Hero Is Overpowered but Overly Cautious (opening key animation)

==== 2020 ====
- SHOW BY ROCK!! Mashumairesh!! (ending key animation)
- Boku no Tonari ni Ankoku Hakai Shin ga Imasu (opening, ending key animation)
- Gleipnir (prop design)
- Dropkick on My Devil!! (opening key animation, Season 2)
- Afterschool Embellishments (animation director, episode 10)
- Rent-A-Girlfriend (character design, chief animation director, prop design; ending animation director, episode 7)
- Kuma Kuma Kuma Bear (opening key animation)

==== 2021 ====
- The Hidden Dungeon Only I Can Enter (ending key animation)
- Horimiya (opening key animation)
- SELECTION PROJECT (character design concept, character design, animation director for episodes 1, 4, 7, 10, 13; assistant animation director, episodes 7, 10, 13; 3D animation director, episodes 3, 4, 5, 12, 13; animation director for dance parts)
- My Senpai is Annoying (opening key animation)

==== 2022 ====
- My Dress-Up Darling (key animation, episode 11)
- Kawaii dake janai Shikimori-san (opening animation director, key animation, episode 8)
- Healer Girl (opening key animation)
- Kunoichi Tsubaki no Mune no Uchi (opening key animation)
- Rent-a-Girlfriend Season 2 (character design, prop design, chief animation director, opening key animation, key animation)

==== 2023 ====
- Oshi no Ko (character design, chief animation director for episodes 1, 2, 5, 8, 11; character supervisor for episodes 3, 4, 6, 7, 9, 10; opening, ending animation director)
- Skip and Loafer (opening key animation)
- Boku no Kokoro no Yabai Yatsu (ending animation)
- Rent-a-Girlfriend Season 3 (character design, prop design, animation supervisor, opening, ending animation director)
- Bokura no Ameiro Protocol (character design, opening animation director)
- The Apothecary Diaries (ending key animation)

==== 2024 ====
- Oshi no Ko Season 2 (character design)

==== 2025 ====
- Rent-a-Girlfriend Season 4 (character design)

=== Theatrical anime ===
==== 2019 ====
- Kono Subarashii Sekai ni Shukufuku wo! Kurenai Densetsu (key animation)
- BLACKFOX (key animation)

==== 2020 ====
- Umibe no Etranger (animation director)

=== OVA ===
==== 2017 ====
- Escacron Project (key animation, episode 2)

==== 2018 ====
- Super Idol Legend Omori Koko (character design, main story)

==== 2019 ====
- Eromanga Sensei OVA (key animation, episode 2)
- Grisaia: Phantom Trigger THE ANIMATION (assistant animation director, opening/ending/main story key animation)
- Our Maid is Annoying OVA (animation director, key animation)

=== Books ===
==== 2017 ====
- Made in Abyss STAFF NOTE (Kinema Citrus, illustrations)

==== 2021 ====
- Artist 100 People 2022 (Remick, BNN: Editor, BNN Inc., ISBN 978-4-8025-1222-0, profile introduction, illustrations)

=== Other ===
==== 2017 ====
- Mousou Shounen Takashi (Tokyo Animator Academy, character design, animation director, key animation, videos, color design, photography, background)

==== 2021 ====
- TV Anime SELECTION PROJECT character design Kaname Hirayama Special drawing video
- SELECTION PROJECT “Sumi Panda’s Behind the Scenes Visit!” episode 1 (studio exploration)
- SELECTION PROJECT “Sumi Panda’s Behind the Scenes Visit!” episode 2 (staff roundtable)

=== Awards ===
==== 2021 ====
- "Best in Character Design (Rent-A-Girlfriend)" at the 7th Anime Trending Awards (2021)

== Activities under the name "kappe" ==
=== Books ===
==== 2018 ====
- CLIP STUDIO PAINT "Good Techniques" Encyclopedia [PRO/EX Compatible] 211 Essential Techniques for Digital illustration (written by Hirai Taro, SB Creative, ISBN 4797396776, contributed 2 illustrations)

==== 2022 ====
- Teach Me How to Make Love a Memory (written by Fuyusaka Utsu, GA Bunko, ISBN 978-4-8156-1443-0, cover & interior illustrations)
- Teach Me How to Make Love a Memory 2 (written by Fuyusaka Utsu, GA Bunko, ISBN 978-4-8156-1444-7, cover & interior illustrations)

==== 2023 ====
- Young Detective Nijikita Kyosuke's Adventures (New Edition) (written by Hayamine Kaoru, Seikaisha FICTIONS, ISBN 978-4-06-533856-8, cover & interior illustrations)

==== 2024 ====
- Young Detective Nijikita Kyosuke's New Adventures (New Edition) (written by Hayamine Kaoru, Seikaisha FICTIONS, ISBN 978-4-06-534813-0, cover & interior illustrations)
- Young Detective Nijikita Kyosuke's New-New Adventures (New Edition) (written by Hayamine Kaoru, Seikaisha FICTIONS, ISBN 978-4-06-535469-8, cover & interior illustrations)

=== illustrations ===
==== 2022 ====
- Nijisanji Girls Unit Merchandise Sereion Girls Academy (2022, 5 illustrations)

=== Doujinshi ===
==== 2021 ====
- A.I. Strength (written by Kaneda Yuma, Upworks Bunko, cover illustration)
- I’m a Limit OL, but My Life Got More Fun After I Picked Up a Stray Cat Demon King (written by Kaeru Ameko, Upworks Bunko, cover illustration)

=== Awards ===
==== 2015 ====
- Denki-gai no Honya-san illustration contest Clip Studio Paint award (2015)

== See also ==
- List of anime industry professionals

=== Sources ===
- Interview with director Koga Kazuomi of the anime Rent-A-Girlfriend / reflecting on the production of season 1 (2020)
