= Shun Horie =

Japanese voice actor (born 1993)

- 堀江 瞬
- Born: May 25, 1993 (age 33); Osaka Prefecture, Japan
- Other name: Horieru
- Occupations: Voice actor; singer
- Years active: 2011–present
- Agent: Raccoon-Dog
- Notable work: Juni Taisen: Zodiac War as Tsugiyoshi Sumino; Death March to the Parallel World Rhapsody as Ichirou Suzuki / Satou; Sarazanmai as Enta Jinnai; Rent-A-Girlfriend as Kazuya Kinoshita; Akudama Drive as Hacker; So I'm a Spider, So What? as Schlain Zagan Analeit / Shunsuke Yamada; High Card as Leo Constantine; The Dangers in My Heart as Kyotaro Ichikawa
- Height: 170 cm (5 ft 7 in)
- Musical career
- Genres: J-pop; Anison
- Instrument: Vocals
- Years active: 2014–present
- Labels: Lantis; Kiramune; Bandai Visual
- Website: www.raccoon-dog.co.jp/talent/m08-horie.html

Shun Horie (堀江 瞬, Horie Shun; born May 25, 1993) is a Japanese voice actor and singer. He is a known member of Raccoon Dog and SparQlew. He won the Best New Actor Award at the 12th Seiyu Awards.

== Filmography ==
=== Anime television series ===
2016

- Age 12: A Little Heart-Pounding, Kazuma Hiyama
- Aikatsu Stars!, Asahi Kasumi
- Phantasy Star Online 2: The Animation, Seiya Urisaka
- Soul Buster, Cao Xing (Sō Sei)
- The Lost Village, Jigoku no Gōka
- Digimon Universe: Appli Monsters, Navimon
- Whistle!, Shō Kazamatsuri (voice remake)

2017

- Altair: A Record of Battles, Ahmet
- Atom: The Beginning, AI, Lab 6 research student, Robot B, Voice A
- Chaos;Child, Matsuki Kazuya
- Fastest Finger First, Shiki Koshiyama
- Hell Girl: Fourth Twilight, Toshio Mikami
- Juni Taisen, Tsugiyoshi Sumino (Nezumi)/Rat
- PriPri Chi-chan!!, Yamato Suō
- The Idolmaster SideM (2017), Pierre

2018

- Angolmois: Record of Mongol Invasion, Amushi
- Death March to the Parallel World Rhapsody, Ichirō Suzuki / Satou Pendragon

2019

- After School Dice Club, Ryūji Yoshioka
- Bakugan: Battle Planet, Trox, Kurin
- My Roommate Is a Cat, Hiroto Yasaka
- Namu Amida Butsu!: Rendai Utena, Fugen Bosatsu
- Sarazanmai, Enta Jinnai
- The King of Fighters for Girls, Bao
- The Seven Deadly Sins, Sariel
- Try Knights, Rinto Arimura

2020

- Akudama Drive, Hacker
- Bakugan: Armored Alliance, Trox, Kurin
- King's Raid: Successors of the Will, Theo
- Rent-A-Girlfriend, Kazuya Kinoshita
- Shachibato! President, It's Time for Battle!, Minato
- Tomica Kizuna Gattai Earth Granner, Joe Pachero

2021

- 2.43: Seiin High School Boys Volleyball Team, Tomoki Kakegawa
- D_Cide Traumerei the Animation, Aruto Fushibe
- Dragon Goes House-Hunting, Letty
- Dragon Quest: The Adventure of Dai, Chiu
- Everything for Demon King Evelogia, Evelogia
- So I'm a Spider, So What?, Schlain Zagan Analeit / Shunsuke Yamada
- Visual Prison, Robin Laffite
- World Trigger Season 2, Kai Minamisawa

2022

- Aoashi, Kanpei Kuroda
- Arknights: Prelude To Dawn, Faust (Sasha)
- Eternal Boys, Sakura Kagurazaka
- In the Land of Leadale, Quolkeh
- Phantom of the Idol, Kazuki Yoshino
- Rent-A-Girlfriend Season 2, Kazuya Kinoshita
- Salaryman's Club, Shuhei Nakamura
- Spy × Family, George Glooman (ep.19)
- Tribe Nine, Haru Shirokane
- VazzRock the Animation, Yuma

2023

- Endo and Kobayashi Live! The Latest on Tsundere Villainess Lieselotte, Fabian Oldenburg
- High Card, Leo Constantine Pinochle
- The Dangers in My Heart, Kyotaro Ichikawa
- Pokémon Horizons: The Series, Amethio
- Migi & Dali, Migi
- Tearmoon Empire, Sion Sol Sunkland

2024

- Shaman King: Flowers, Yohane Asakura
- I Was Reincarnated as the 7th Prince so I Can Take My Time Perfecting My Magical Ability, Albert
- How I Attended an All-Guy's Mixer, Asagi
- A Terrified Teacher at Ghoul School!, Rintarō Miki
- Nina the Starry Bride, Toat
- Blue Miburo, Tarō Tanaka

2025

- I Want to Escape from Princess Lessons, Louis
- Let's Go Karaoke!, Satomi Oka
- A Wild Last Boss Appeared!, Southern Cross Sei
- May I Ask for One Final Thing?, Jin

2026

- Sentenced to Be a Hero, Dotta Luzulas
- An Observation Log of My Fiancée Who Calls Herself a Villainess, Nelt Krum
- Red River, Juda Haspasrupi
- Romelia War Chronicle, Kyle

2027

- No-Clipping My Way to Supremacy!, Latch

=== Anime films ===
- Kaze no Matasaburo (2016), Pekichi
- Aikatsu Stars! The Movie (2016), Asahi Kasumi
- Fate/Grand Order: Moonlight/Lostroom (2017), Galahad
- Love Me, Love Me Not (2020)
- Yamato yo Towa ni: Rebel 3199 (2024), Isidore
- Make a Girl (2025), Akira Mizutamari
- Tatsuki Fujimoto Before Chainsaw Man (2025) – Ibuki
- Whoever Steals This Book (2025), Tori no Negima

=== OVA ===
- Black Clover (2017), Asta

=== Original net animation (ONA) ===
- Chōyū Sekai: Being the Reality (2017), Noii
- MILGRAM (2020), Haruka Sakurai
- Tomica Heroes Jobraver: Tokusō Gattai Robo (2022), Medi Braver
- STRANGE EDEN (2026), Hinata Uzuki

=== Drama CD ===
- Fantastic Night (2021), Mint

=== Dubbing ===
Live-action

- The Undoing, Henry Fraser (Noah Jupe)

Animation

- The Addams Family, Pugsley Addams
- The Addams Family 2, Pugsley Addams
- All Saints Street, Abu

=== Video games ===
- Captain Tsubasa: Rise of New Champions, Ismael Senghor
- Elsword, Noah Ebalon
- Fire Emblem: Three Houses, Linhardt von Hevring
- Genshin Impact, Traveler
- The Legend of Heroes: Trails Through Daybreak II, Ixs
- The Hundred Line: Last Defense Academy, Shouma Ginzaki
