= D Anime Store =

Japanese anime streaming service

d anime store
- Website type: OTT video streaming platform
- Available in: Japanese; English
- Area served: Japan
- Owners: NTT Docomo (60%); Kadokawa (40%)
- Key people: Takaeshi Ochi (President)
- Parent: Docomo Anime Store
- Website: animestore.docomo.ne.jp
- Advertising: Yes
- Registration: Required
- Users: ▲2.5 million (as of October 2021)
- Launched: July 3, 2012; 14 years ago (as Anime Store)
- Current status: Active

D Anime Store (dアニメストア), stylized as d anime store, is a Japanese subscription video on demand (SVOD) service specializing in anime. Launched in July 2012 as a joint venture between NTT Docomo, Japan's largest mobile telecommunications operator, and Kadokawa Shoten, a major publishing and media company, it has grown to become one of Japan's largest anime streaming platforms, offering over 6,000 titles.

The platform provides a comprehensive range of anime-related content, including early simulcast streaming of currently airing television anime, 2.5D musicals, and anime music concerts. Beyond video streaming, the service features an integrated ecosystem that allows users to purchase anime merchandise and original e-books (manga and light novels) directly within the platform.

Originally launched as an exclusive service for NTT Docomo mobile subscribers, the platform became mobile carrier-free in 2014, making it accessible to the general public. As of 2026, the standard monthly subscription fee is ¥660 (or ¥760 for subscriptions billed through app stores). In addition to its primary platform, the service has expanded its reach through external channels, such as the D Anime Store Niconico Branch on the video-sharing service Niconico and D Anime Store for Prime Video on Amazon Prime Video.

== History ==
=== 2012–2013: Establishment and launch ===
On May 16, 2012, NTT Docomo and Kadokawa Shoten agreed to establish Docomo Anime Store Inc., a joint venture to operate a smartphone anime streaming business. The company was established in late May of the same year. On July 3, 2012, the flat-rate anime streaming service Anime Store was launched within NTT Docomo's D Market portal. At the time of its launch, the service was available exclusively to Docomo subscribers, offering approximately 600 titles and 9,000 episodes for a monthly fee of ¥420 (tax included).

The number of subscribers reached 100,000 on September 17, 2012, and 500,000 by May 4, 2013. On January 30, 2013, Anime Store was renamed D Anime Store, and the platform continued to expand its library, including the start of exclusive streaming for Hyouka in June 2013.

=== 2014–2016: Carrier-free transition and multi-device support ===
By March 2014, the number of subscribers had surpassed 1 million, and the library had expanded to approximately 900 titles and 14,000 episodes. On April 1 of the same year, the service became carrier-free, allowing customers of other telecommunications carriers such as au and SoftBank to access the platform by registering for a docomo ID (as it was known at the time). Concurrently, titles from Fuji TV's Noitamina programming block and the Mobile Suit Gundam franchise were added to the lineup.

The service also expanded its device compatibility, adding support for Google Chromecast on December 18, 2014, and for Apple TV (AirPlay) on December 19, enabling users to cast content to televisions.

On September 29, 2015, the website was updated to introduce new features, including continuous playback, personalized recommendations, and the ability to edit and share custom playlists.

On March 23, 2016, the platform expanded its content by launching a streaming service for anime music videos. Concurrently, it introduced an e-commerce integration in partnership with Animate, a major Japanese retail chain specializing in anime and manga merchandise, allowing users to purchase related goods directly from series pages. Furthermore, an HTML5 video player was implemented for the PC version, adding support for web browsers such as Google Chrome and Microsoft Edge.

On September 15 of the same year, the service further expanded its supported devices by becoming available on Amazon Fire TV, Fire TV Stick, and Android TV devices.

=== 2017–2020: External platform expansion and e-commerce integration ===
On December 1, 2017, the service expanded its reach by opening the D Anime Store Niconico Branch within Niconico, a video-sharing service operated by the Kadokawa-owned media company Dwango. This channel allowed users to watch approximately 1,500 titles for a monthly fee of ¥400 (excluding tax) while utilizing Niconico's signature real-time overlaid comment feature. On July 3, 2018, Docomo began providing content to Amazon's Prime Video Channels, launching D Anime Store for Prime Video. This made approximately 1,500 titles available to Amazon Prime members for an additional monthly fee. By this time, the main D Anime Store platform had grown to offer approximately 2,500 titles. In 2019, the platform launched the annual D Anime Store Awards to recognize popular titles voted on by users.

On September 1, 2020, Docomo launched a direct merchandise sales feature within the D Anime Store platform. Previously reliant on an external partnership with Animate, this new feature allowed users to purchase anime goods—such as figures, keychains, and books—directly from participating manufacturers (initially 20 companies, including Bushiroad and FuRyu) via links on the anime viewing and title pages.

=== 2021–present: Content diversification and service restructuring ===
In March 2021, the platform began significantly expanding its live content offerings, streaming voice actor talk events, 2.5D stage plays, and anime music concerts.

On September 16, 2021, an update was rolled out for the Android app and PC website, introducing support for Full HD video streaming. The iOS app followed with an update on September 21, and Full HD content gradually became available starting in late September.

On March 1, 2023, the monthly subscription fee for D Anime Store was revised, increasing from ¥440 to ¥550.

On July 6, 2023, the platform launched an e-book storefront primarily focused on the original manga and light novels of streamed anime. This update enabled a seamless transition between watching an anime and reading its source material within the same ecosystem. Concurrently, in-app purchases via Apple's App Store and Google Play were introduced, allowing users to purchase digital coins for e-books and pay for their monthly subscriptions through these app stores (with the monthly fee via in-app billing set at ¥650).

On May 21, 2024, the service expanded its supported devices to home video game consoles by launching a dedicated application for the PlayStation 5. By November of the same year, the platform's library had grown to offer over 6,000 titles.

In November 2025, NTT Docomo announced that D Anime Store would be integrated into its "Docomo MAX" and "Docomo Poi-katsu MAX" mobile plans as a selectable benefit starting in February 2026. On February 1, 2026, the standard monthly subscription fee was increased from ¥550 to ¥660. The fee for subscriptions billed through Apple's App Store and Google Play was concurrently raised from ¥650 to ¥760 (with the Google Play price revision taking effect on February 10).

== Supported devices and features ==
The service is accessible across a wide range of devices. It supports web browsers on personal computers, as well as dedicated applications for iOS and Android smartphones and tablets. For television viewing, it is compatible with digital media players such as Apple TV, Chromecast, Amazon Fire TV, and Android TV-equipped devices. It also supports home video game consoles, including PlayStation 4 and PlayStation 5.

Key viewing features include a download function for offline playback, continuous playback for sequential episodes, and the ability to organize titles into custom playlists. The video streaming quality can be adjusted across multiple tiers, supporting up to Full HD (1080p) resolution for compatible content.

== Pricing and subscriptions ==
As of February 2026, the standard monthly subscription fee for the main D Anime Store service is ¥660. However, users who subscribe through in-app billing via the App Store or Google Play are charged ¥760 per month. Additionally, the service is offered as a selectable benefit within specific NTT Docomo mobile plans, such as "Docomo MAX."

== Third-party platform channels ==
In addition to its proprietary platform, D Anime Store licenses its brand and a curated selection of its content library to third-party streaming services:

- D Anime Store Niconico Branch: Launched in December 2017 within Dwango's Niconico platform. Subscribers can watch anime while utilizing Niconico's real-time scrolling comment feature and participate in live broadcasts.[15]
- D Anime Store for Prime Video: Launched in July 2018 as an add-on subscription channel within Amazon Prime Video.[16][17]

== Related services ==
The platform features an integrated ecosystem that links anime viewing with related commerce:

- Merchandise sales: Introduced in September 2020, this feature allows users to purchase anime-related goods, such as figures and apparel, directly from participating manufacturers through links on the anime title pages.
- E-books: Launched in July 2023, the service sells digital versions of manga and light novels, primarily focusing on the source material of the anime available on the platform. Users can seamlessly transition between watching an anime and reading its original comic or novel.

== See also ==
- Lemino
