= Matsuno =

Matsuno (written: 松野 lit. "pine field") is a Japanese surname. Notable people with the surname include:

- Akemi Matsuno (松野 明美, born 1968), Japanese long-distance runner
- Akinari Matsuno (松野 秋鳴, 1979–2011), Japanese writer
- Matsuno Chikanobu (松野 親信, fl. 1720s), Japanese painter
- Clara Matsuno (松野 クララ, 1853–1931 or 1941), German educator in Japan
- Hirokazu Matsuno (松野 博一, born 1962), Japanese politician
- Nobuo Matsuno (松野 信夫, born 1951), Japanese politician
- Raizo Matsuno (松野 頼三, 1917–2006), Japanese politician
- Rina Matsuno (松野 莉奈, 1998-2017), Japanese idol
- Shuji Matsuno (松野 修二, born 1963), Japanese badminton player
- Taiki Matsuno (松野 太紀, born 1967), Japanese voice actor
- Yorihisa Matsuno (松野 頼久, born 1960), Japanese politician
- Yasumi Matsuno (松野 泰己, born 1965), Japanese video game designer
- Yukihide Matsuno (松野 行秀, born 1961), Japanese professional wrestler known as Gorgeous Matsuno

== See also ==
- Matsuno, Ehime (松野町), a town in Kitauwa District, Ehime Prefecture, Japan
- Matsuno Dam (松野ダム), a dam in Mizunami, Gifu Prefecture, Japan
