= 22/7 =

22/7 may refer to:

- Approximations of pi
  - Proof that 22/7 exceeds π
  - Pi Day, mathematical celebration on March 14
- July 22
  - 2011 Norway attacks, referred to in Norway as 22 July or 22/7
- 22/7 (group), a Japanese idol group
  - 22/7 (TV series), Japanese anime series based on the idol group
