= Ranze =

Ranze may refer to:

== People ==
- Ranze Terade, performer with Japanese girl group AKB48
- Ranze Terada, actress known for the Sailor Moon manga series

== Characters ==
- Ranze Eto, a character in the manga series Tokimeki Tonight
- Ranze Ichijou, a character in the anime series Hug! PreCure
- Ranze Kurona, a character in the manga and anime series Blue Lock
- Ranze Nanahoshi, a character in the anime series Yu-Gi-Oh! Sevens
- King Ranze of Wimburg, a character in the anime series The Fruit of Evolution

== Others ==
- Edo Ranze, a 2008 visual novel by QP:flapper
