= Akinari =

- Gender: Male

Origin
- Origin: Japanese
- Meaning: Different meanings depending on the kanji used

Akinari (written: 秋成, 秋鳴 or 旺成) is a masculine Japanese given name. Notable people with the name include:

- Akinari Kawazura (河面 旺成; born 1994), Japanese footballer
- Akinari Matsuno (松野 秋鳴; 1979–2011), Japanese light novel author
- Ueda Akinari (上田 秋成; 1734–1809), Japanese writer and poet
