= Cultural Exchange with a Game Centre Girl =

Japanese manga series by Hirokazu Yasuhara

- First tankōbon volume cover, featuring Lily Baker

ゲーセン少女と異文化交流 (Gēsen Shōjo to Ibunka Kōryū)
- Genre: Romantic comedy
- Manga
- Written by: Hirokazu Yasuhara
- Published by: Fujimi Shobo
- Imprint: Dragon Comics Age
- Magazine: Niconico Seiga (DraDra Sharp)
- Original run: May 15, 2020 – August 14, 2026
- Volumes: 12
- Anime television series
- Directed by: Toshihiro Kikuchi
- Written by: Yasunori Yamada
- Music by: Takurō Iga
- Studio: Nomad
- Licensed by: Crunchyroll
- Original network: AT-X, Tokyo MX, Sun TV, KBS Kyoto, BS Asahi
- Original run: July 6, 2025 – September 28, 2025
- Episodes: 12
- icon

Cultural Exchange with a Game Centre Girl (Japanese: ゲーセン少女と異文化交流, Hepburn: Gēsen Shōjo to Ibunka Kōryū) is a Japanese manga series written and illustrated by Hirokazu Yasuhara. It originally began serialization online via Twitter and Pixiv in December 2019. It was later serialized by Fujimi Shobo via the Niconico Seiga website under their DraDra Sharp brand from May 2020 to August 2026 and was collected in twelve tankōbon volumes. An anime television series adaptation produced by Nomad aired from July to September 2025.

== Plot ==
Renji Kusakabe, a college student working part-time at an arcade, encounters Lily Baker, a young girl who is trying to get a koala plush from a claw machine. After he assists her in getting the plush, Lily becomes attached to him, becoming a regular at the arcade. Lily, a British girl who just recently moved to Japan, is still not fluent in Japanese. However, with Renji's help, she becomes less shy and opens up to others, finding her place in Japan.

== Characters ==
Lily Baker (リリー・ベイカー, Rirī Beikā)
Voiced by: Nao Tōyama (voice comic, PV), Sally Amaki (anime) (Japanese); Bryn Apprill (English)
Lily is a 13-year-old British girl who moves to Japan. As Lily has only recently arrived in Japan, she is still improving her Japanese. She enjoys playing at the arcade, but is not good at video games. She likes koala goods.
Renji Kusakabe (草壁 蓮司, Kusakabe Renji)
Voiced by: Shōya Chiba (anime) (Japanese); Conner Allison (English)
Renji is an 18-year-old university student who works part-time at a game arcade center. He is skilled at playing video games.
Aoi Kusakabe (草壁 葵衣, Kusakabe Aoi)
Voiced by: Reo Osanai (Japanese); Kayla Parker (English)
Aoi is Renji's younger sister and Lily's classmate. Although she was not originally that interested in video games(only played them once in a while), she gains a greater interest in them after befriending Lily.
Karin Kaga (加賀 花梨, Kaga Karin)
Voiced by: Asaki Yuikawa (Japanese); Lexi Nieto (English)
Karin is a tomboyish gamer girl around Lily's age who has a rivalry with Renji in terms of fighting games. She later serves as mentor to Lily into getting better and gifts her an arcade stick on her birthday.
Hotaru Katsuragi (桂木 蛍, Katsuragi Hotaru)
Voiced by: Kaori Ishihara (Japanese); Jill Harris (English)
Hotaru is a straight-A school president within Lily's school who slowly ingratiates herself into Lily's friend circle by using her authority as a school president, before becoming a regular student.
Momoko Mochizuki (望月 桃子, Mochizuki Momoko)
Voiced by: Ai Kayano (Japanese); Morgan Lauré Garrett (English)
Sheryl Baker (シェリル・ベイカー, Sheriru Beikā)
Voiced by: Manami Tanaka (Japanese); Grainne Noel (English)
Sheryl is Lily's mother.
Oliver Baker (オリバー・ベイカー, Oribā Beikā)
Voiced by: Kentaro Tone
Oliver is Lily's father who is over-protective of Lily and was initially suspicious about their relationship, but becomes fond of him after realizing how much he meant to her.

== Media ==
=== Manga ===
Written and illustrated by Hirokazu Yasuhara, Cultural Exchange with Game Center Girl began serialization online via the author's Twitter and Pixiv accounts on December 22, 2019. It was later acquired by Fujimi Shobo who published it on the Niconico Seiga website under their DraDra Sharp brand from May 15, 2020, to August 14, 2026. The series' chapters were collected into twelve tankōbon volumes released from December 9, 2020 to October 9, 2026.

No.	Release date	ISBN
1	December 9, 2020	978-4-04-073904-5
2	July 9, 2021	978-4-04-074166-6
3	December 9, 2021	978-4-04-074341-7
4	July 8, 2022	978-4-04-074592-3
5	December 9, 2022	978-4-04-074781-1
6	July 7, 2023	978-4-04-075049-1
7	December 8, 2023	978-4-04-075234-1
8	July 9, 2024	978-4-04-075520-5
9	December 9, 2024	978-4-04-075704-9
10	July 9, 2025	978-4-04-075997-5
11	December 9, 2025	978-4-04-076197-8
12	October 9, 2026	978-4-04-076580-8

=== Anime ===
An anime adaptation was announced on August 29, 2024. It was later confirmed to be a television series produced by Nomad and directed by Toshihiro Kikuchi, with series composition handled by Yasunori Yamada, characters designed by Rikiya Okano, and music composed by Takurō Iga. The series aired from July 6 to September 28, 2025, on AT-X and other networks. The opening theme song is "Their Start Button" (ふたりのスタートボタン, Futari no Sutāto Botan), performed by Sally Amaki and Reo Osanai as their characters, and the ending theme song is "Amusing Flavor", performed by Amaki. Crunchyroll streams the series.

==== Episodes ====
No.	Title	Directed by	Written by	Storyboarded by	Original release date
1	"Boy Meets the Game Centre Girl"	Toshihiro Kikuchi	Yasunori Yamada	Toshihiro Kikuchi	July 6, 2025
2	"If Pushing Doesn't Work, Try Pulling"	Yudai Hanaoka	Yasunori Yamada	Yudai Hanaoka	July 13, 2025
3	"Where Is Your Brother?"	Lim Chae-gil	Akamaki Tart	Masami Watanabe	July 20, 2025
4	"Can I Get a Minute?"	Wang Yi	Usaki Usagi	Toshihiro Kikuchi	July 27, 2025
5	"This Is My Dad!"	Sumio Watanabe	Yasunori Yamada	Toshihiro Kikuchi	August 3, 2025
6	"I Didn't Notice That At All!"	Yudai Hanaoka, Toshihiro Kikuchi	Usaki Usagi	Toshihiro Kikuchi	August 10, 2025
7	"All Work and No Play Makes Hotaru a Dull Girl"	Kosuke Wagasuki	Akamaki Tart	Ryousuke Shibuya	August 24, 2025
8	"Happy Birthday to You"	Lim Chae-gil	Akamaki Tart	Satoru Yamashita	August 31, 2025
9	"Summer Holidays!"	Ken Kiyota	Yasunori Yamada	Yamamakura	September 7, 2025
10	"OKF Tournament"	Ken Kiyota and Kenji Sakurada	Usagi Usaki	Yuto Higashiyama	September 14, 2025
11	"Homecoming"	Kiyoshi Murayama	Yasunori Yamada	Toshihiro Kikuchi	September 21, 2025
12	"My Feelings Haven't Changed"	Toshihiro Kikuchi and Yudai Hanaoka	Yasunori Yamada	Toshihiro Kikuchi	September 28, 2025

=== Other ===
In commemoration of the release of the series' second volume, a promotional video was released on Kadokawa Corporation's YouTube channel on July 8, 2021. The promotional video featured the performance of Nao Tōyama as Lily.
