= MM! =

Japanese light novel and anime series

- Cover of MM! light novel volume 1 featuring Mio Isurugi (left), Arashiko Yuno (right) and Taro Sado (bottom).

えむえむっ! (Emu Emu!)
- Genre: Harem, romantic comedy
- Light novel
- Written by: Akinari Matsuno
- Illustrated by: QP:flapper
- Published by: Media Factory
- Imprint: MF Bunko J
- Original run: February 23, 2007 – September 24, 2010
- Volumes: 12
- Manga
- Written by: Issei Hyoju
- Published by: Media Factory
- Magazine: Monthly Comic Alive
- Original run: July 26, 2008 – February 27, 2012
- Volumes: 7
- Anime television series
- Directed by: Tsuyoshi Nagasawa
- Written by: Rie Koshika
- Music by: Yukari Hashimoto
- Studio: Xebec
- Licensed by: NA: Sentai Filmworks
- Original network: AT-X
- English network: NA: Anime Network
- Original run: October 2, 2010 – December 18, 2010
- Episodes: 12
- icon

MM! (えむえむっ!, Emu Emu!) is a Japanese light novel series by Akinari Matsuno, with illustrations provided by the group QP:flapper made up of Tometa Ohara and Koharu Sakura. Media Factory published 12 novels under their MF Bunko J imprint between February 2007 and September 2010, including two side story volumes. The series was left unfinished due to the author's death on April 18, 2011. A manga adaptation by Issei Hyoju was serialized between the September 2008 and April 2012 issues of Media Factory's Monthly Comic Alive. A drama CD adaption was released by Edge Records on March 24, 2010, and its first-press limited edition came with a bonus CD. A 12-episode anime adaptation produced by Xebec aired between October and December 2010. Sentai Filmworks released the anime series on English-subtitled DVD in North America in September 2011, and then re-released it in February 2014 with an English dub on both DVD and Blu-ray.

== Plot ==
Taro Sado is a masochist and goes to a high school with his male friend Tatsukichi Hayama. Taro falls in love for the first time with a girl and wants to be cured of his masochism so that he can confess his love to her, unaware at the time that she is actually his cross-dressing male friend Tatsukichi, so he goes to the Second Voluntary Club to get help. There he meets Mio Isurugi, a self-proclaimed goddess, and Arashiko Yuno, the girl who made him a masochist in the first place, however, she has androphobia. The club adviser is the school nurse, Michiru Onigawara. Other characters include Yumi Mamiya, Arashiko's best friend, and the president of the Inventors Club, Noa Hiragi, and her lolicon assistant, Himura Yukinojō.

== Characters ==
Taro Sado (砂戸 太郎, Sado Tarō)
Voiced by: Chihiro Suzuki (drama CD), Jun Fukuyama (anime) (Japanese); Blake Shepard (English)
Taro Sado is the main protagonist of the story, and a true masochist. He went to the same middle school as Yūno, who he said is at fault for turning him into a masochist. He is not sexually attracted to his relatives, though his mother and older sister are attracted to him and have an overprotective relationship with him. He is sometimes forced to perform cross-dressing (in the anime, he was cross dressing because he was hypnotized by Mio, and fell in love with the male Tatsukichi, who tries to avoid Taro by cross dressing). Taro is known to have a ridiculous amount of "Pervert Energy" (over 30,000 units, compared to 5 units for average people) which was employed by Noa in one of her schemes. Despite the fact that he is a self-proclaimed "Super Masochist", Taro will not hesitate to help out his friends, such as rushing Mio to a hospital when she collapsed during their mock-wedding on their date, trying to beat up the senior who attempted to sexually assault Arashiko way back despite being outmatched, acknowledging Tatsukichi's cross-dressing, and telling him that he does not mind his interests. His first kiss was with Mio.

Mio Isurugi (石動 美緒, Isurugi Mio)
Voiced by: Kana Hanazawa/Chihiro Ishiguro (drama CD), Ayana Taketatsu (anime) (Japanese); Monica Rial (English)
Mio Isurugi is Taro Sado's senior. She is the head of his school club and is violent to Taro due to her superiority complex. She is a self-proclaimed deity, who apparently has ailurophobia. She is an extreme tsundere, and repeatedly attacks Taro, in an (unsuccessful) attempt to cure his masochism. She is shown to be very athletic, but has been said by Arashiko to not be very good at studies. There is an implication that she has feelings for Taro (as a result of his kindness towards her, plus the fact that he treats her just as he does with everybody else), although she does not admit it. It is suggested that she became jealous when another girl makes advances towards Taro, as in the case of her being more violent towards him when Noa gave him a mound of lilacs. She seems to be unaware of the fact that she has developed an attachment towards Taro, nor the fact that she has unconsciously developed feelings towards him, and constantly denies these facts whenever Arashiko has pointed it out. Her first kiss was with Taro.
Mio does not get along well with Tatsukichi when his alter-ego surfaces while cross-dressing, especially from the fact that Tatsukichi belittles Mio's bust size whenever his alter-ego comes out. She does not quite realize that she has an innate sadistic personality, which may explain why she constantly resorts to violent measures to cure his masochism.

Arashiko Yuno (結野 嵐子, Yūno Arashiko)
Voiced by: Yui Horie (drama CD), Saori Hayami (anime) (Japanese); Emily Neves (English)
Yuno is Taro Sado's classmate. She has androphobia, due to an attempted sexual assault by her former boyfriend in junior high school, and will attack any male who touches her, subconsciously feeling that she has to hit them before they hit her. She is apparently the one who caused Taro to become a masochist but, despite her androphobia, develops a crush on him, and is also hinted to be jealous as well when another girl is involved with Taro.
She occasionally gets into situations where she briefly forgets her androphobia in her eagerness to get closer to Taro (or is accidentally touched by him), and when she actually realizes what happens, she comically assaults Taro who, due to his masochism, enjoys it.

Tatsukichi Hayama (葉山 辰吉, Hayama Tatsukichi)
Voiced by: Rina Satō (Japanese); Meaghan Avocato (English)
Hayama is Taro Sado's classmate and close friend. He enjoys cross-dressing (which induces his female alter-ego "Tatsumi Antoinette XVI" to appear). He is troubled at the start when Taro, who does not know of Tatsukichi's hobby, becomes infatuated with his female alter ego. While cross-dressing, his alter-ego has a superiority complex, and repeatedly argues with Isurugi (sometimes over Taro's affection), as well as verbally attacking Mio's breast size repeatedly. He was previously in a relationship with Yuno's best friend Yumi, but states that he is now unsure how he feels about her.

Yumi Mamiya (間宮 由美, Mamiya Yumi)
Voiced by: Yūko Gibu (Japanese); Maggie Flecknoe (English)
Mamiya is Yuno's light pink haired best friend who is skilled in massaging. She hates Taro and loves Tatsukichi, but does not know that Tatsukichi is a cross-dresser. In certain scenes in the anime, it is implied that she has lesbian tendencies when groping and fondling Arashiko and Mio.

Michiru Onigawara (鬼瓦 みちる, Onigawara Michiru)
Voiced by: Houko Kuwashima (drama CD), Rie Tanaka (anime) (Japanese); Genevieve Simmons (English)
Onigawara is a school nurse at Taro's school who enjoys making people to perform cosplay. She is something of a sadist and has a close relationship to Mio, to the point that Mio calls her "Michiru-nee". She is shown to enjoy taking pictures of pretty girls, especially when they're wearing costumes she created for them. She also knows that Mio, Arashiko and Noa have feelings for Taro, and usually places competitions where he is the prize.

Noa Hiiragi (柊 ノア, Hiiragi Noa)
Voiced by: Sayuri Yahagi (Japanese); Brittney Karbowski (English)
Hiiragi is a senior of Taro. She was introduced in Volume 5 of the original light novel. Her body looks like a preadolescent girl. She is the president of the Invention Club at Taro's school, and is a genius with an IQ of over 200. Due to her insecurities at not being able to lead a normal life, she comes up with a scheme which would turn everyone in the world into perverts (if they were not already one). However, she is talked out of it by Taro, and is saved by him when the broken machine threatens to fall on her. Since then, she falls for Taro, since he happens to be her first love (she gave him a mound of lilacs which was, as stated by Arashiko, holds the meaning of first love in the language of flowers.) Like Mio, she dislikes people insulting her childish stature.

Yukinojō Himura (日村 雪之丞, Himura Yukinojō)
Voiced by: Tsubasa Yonaga (Japanese); Clint Bickham (English)
He is Noa's assistant who is quite handsome and is known to be a lolicon. Himura loves Noa because of her body and that is the sole reason for him joining the Invention Club.

Shizuka Sado (砂戸 静香, Sado Shizuka)
Voiced by: Ai Nonaka (drama CD), Kana Asumi (anime) (Japanese); Tiffany Grant (English)
Shizuka is Taro's older sister with an extreme brother complex. She shows extreme love for Taro, and has a habit of treating him like a little baby. She is crazy when it comes to his love life and is joked to being infatuated with him. Despite looking like a middle-schooler, she is actually a college student.

Tomoko Sado (砂戸 智子, Sado Tomoko)
Voiced by: Aya Hisakawa (drama CD), Sayaka Ohara (anime) (Japanese); Shelley Calene-Black (English)
Tomoko is Taro's mother who is very overprotective of her son, to the point where she would conspire with her daughter Shizuka, even though she is her "rival" to Taro's heart whenever a girl comes into his life besides them. She is obsessed with Taro in protecting him and comically sometimes joked to the point of being infatuated with him. She adds the "-san" suffix to both her children's names.

Nanaha Sado (砂戸 七葉, Sado Nanaha)
Nanaha is Taro Sado's cousin. She was introduced in Volume 6 of the original novel series. She is a junior high school student who sometimes visits Taro's room, making Shizuka and Tomoko angry. Although first cousins can marry under the family law in Japan, Taro is not sexually attracted to Nanaha because he treats her as a member of the family. Nanaha is hated by Shizuka and Tomoko, and they treat her very badly.

Store Manager, Dōmyōji (道明寺店長, Dōmyōji Tenchō)
Voiced by: Tomokazu Sugita (Japanese); Kyle Jones (English)
The manager of the store in which Taro works at. He is known to have a fetish for 2D girls and is heard to have called his assorted merchandise of 2D beauties as his "wives".

== Media ==
=== Print ===
MM! began as a light novel series written by Akinari Matsuno, with illustrations by the group QP:flapper made up of Tometa Ohara and Koharu Sakura. Media Factory published 12 volumes between February 23, 2007, and September 24, 2010, under their MF Bunko J imprint; 10 comprise the main story, while the other two are side story collections. The series was left unfinished due to the author's death on April 18, 2011. The novels are also published by Tong Li Publishing in Taiwan.

A manga adaptation illustrated by Issei Hyoju was serialized between the September 2008 and April 2012 issues of Media Factory's Monthly Comic Alive. The chapters were collected into seven tankōbon volumes published between February 23, 2009, and March 23, 2012.

=== Anime ===
A 12-episode anime television series adaptation produced by Xebec, written by Rie Koshika, and directed by Tsuyoshi Nagasawa aired in Japan between October 2 and December 18, 2010, on AT-X. The series was released on six BD/DVD compilation volumes between December 22, 2010, and May 25, 2011. Bonus shorts titled SS! were included on the BD/DVD volumes. Sentai Filmworks licensed the anime for distribution North America and released a Japanese language DVD set with English subtitles of the anime series on September 13, 2011. English-language versions on DVD and Blu-ray Disc was released on February 11, 2014. The Japanese-language version of the series was posted on the Anime Network website for online streaming in 2011 and the English-language version was added in January 2014. The series began streaming on Hulu in 2014.

The series has two opening themes and two ending themes. The first opening theme is "Help!! (Hell side)" by Ayana Taketatsu and is used for the first four episodes, and the second opening theme is "Help!! (Heaven side)" by Taketatsu and Saori Hayami for the subsequent episodes. The main ending theme is "More-more Lovers!!" by Natsuko Aso and is used for the first 11 episodes. The second ending theme is "Happy Birthday, my holy day" by Taketatsu and is used for episode 12. The insert song "Hallelujah Study" (ハレルヤ♡スタディ) by Hayami was used in episode nine. Two character song singles were released for Mio (Taketatsu) on December 15, 2010, and Arashiko (Hayami) on January 26, 2011. The anime's original soundtrack was released on December 22, 2010.

==== Episode list ====
No.	Title	Original release date
1	"Sharp Descending First Love!"; Transliteration: "Chokkakō Fāsuto Rabu!" (Japanese: 直滑降ファーストラブっ!)	October 2, 2010
Sado Tarou suffers from sexual masochism; he experiences sexual pleasure from pain. He falls in love with a certain girl, Shihori, but decides he cannot pursue her with his condition. His best friend, Tatsukichi Hayama, tells him to visit the Voluntary Club, a place that grants students' wishes, for a cure. At the club, he finds Isurugi Mio, a girl who thinks she is a god. She pretends to be nice but as soon as Tarou tries to leave, she turns into an evil monster telling him that she was being patient. He also sees Arashiko Yuno, whom he apparently has known before in middle school, the girl who was actually responsible for his masochism. Later, Mio decides to continue his treatment by giving Tarou so much pain, his mind will no longer feel any pleasure. She injures him so he must stay in the infirmary where Yuno looks after him. After catching her from tripping, Yuno mercilessly beats Tarou up showing her fear of men. The school nurse Michiru, shows up and shows Tarou that she knows Mio and Yuno well and that she is a bit of a sadist. Tarou's older sister and mother are introduced when he comes home to show that they might have a bit of a brother/son complex for Tarou. At work Shihori shows up only to run away from Tarou who chases her down only to discover that it was Tatsukichi all along cross dressing. He explains the reason for his cross dressing habits and said that he too went to the Voluntary Club to get help. It was Mio in fact who had told him to tell Tarou of his habit.
2	"The Distance Between Similar People"; Transliteration: "Nita Mono Dōshi no Disutansu" (Japanese: 似たものどうしのディスタンス)	October 9, 2010
3	"The Dog Fight for You"; Transliteration: "Kimi no Tame no Doggu Faito" (Japanese: 君のためのドッグファイト)	October 16, 2010
4	"This and That Silly Couple"; Transliteration: "Sonna Konna de Kappuru Bakappuru" (Japanese: そんなこんなでカップルバカップル)	October 23, 2010
5	"The Genius Girl's Runaway Panic!"; Transliteration: "Tensai Shōjo no Bōsō Panikku!" (Japanese: 天才少女の暴走パニック!)	October 30, 2010
6	"My Mayhem-Filled Home"; Transliteration: "Sōran darake no Maihōmu" (Japanese: 騒乱だらけのマイホーム)	November 6, 2010
7	"A Midsummer's Love Triangle?"; Transliteration: "Manatsu no Toraianguru Rabu?" (Japanese: 真夏のトライアングルラブ?)	November 13, 2010
8	"A 'B and L' Patterned Love"; Transliteration: "B de L na Hen'ai Moyō" (Japanese: BでLな変愛模様)	November 20, 2010
9	"MFC's Great Conspiracy"; Transliteration: "MFC no Karei Naru Inbō" (Japanese: MFCの華麗なる陰謀)	November 27, 2010
10	"Miss Sadistic Arashiko"; Transliteration: "Sadisutikku Arashiko-jō" (Japanese: サディスティック嵐子嬢)	December 4, 2010
11	"The Lost Memory"; Transliteration: "Ushinawareta Memorī" (Japanese: 失われたメモリー)	December 11, 2010
12	"A Christmas Wish"; Transliteration: "Kurisumasu no Negaigoto" (Japanese: クリスマスの願いごと)	December 18, 2010
