= Ichijyoma Mankitsu Gurashi! =

Japanese manga series

- First tankōbon volume cover, featuring Meiko Morita

一畳間まんきつ暮らし! (Ichijōma Mankitsu Gurashi!)
- Genre: Comedy; Slice of life
- Manga
- Written by: Kumako Hisama
- Published by: Houbunsha
- Imprint: Manga Time KR Comics
- Magazine: Manga Time Kirara
- Original run: December 7, 2018 – present
- Volumes: 5
- Anime television series
- Directed by: Toshinori Watanabe
- Written by: Tatsuya Takahashi; Kana Yamada
- Music by: Monaca
- Studio: PRA
- Licensed by: Remow
- Original network: ANN (ABC TV, TV Asahi), BS NTV
- Original run: April 12, 2026 – June 21, 2026
- Episodes: 11
- icon

Ichijyoma Mankitsu Gurashi! (一畳間まんきつ暮らし!, Ichijōma Mankitsu Gurashi!; lit. 'Living in a One-Tatami Room!') is a Japanese four-panel manga series written and illustrated by Kumako Hisama. It began serialization in Houbunsha's Manga Time Kirara magazine in December 2018, and has been compiled into five volumes as of May 2026. An anime television series adaptation produced by PRA aired from April to June 2026.

== Plot ==
The series follows Meiko Morita, a high school girl from the countryside. She enrolls at Amamiya Girls Academy, an all-girls school in Tokyo, attracted by an offer to live at a dorm with an allowance. However, upon arriving in Tokyo, she discovers that the dorm is actually a manga cafe. She ends up working at the cafe in order to pay for her tuition, befriending the cafe's residents.

== Characters ==
Meiko Morita (森田 芽衣子, Morita Meiko)
Voiced by: Hana Hishikawa
A second-year high school student from Akita Prefecture. She moved to Tokyo, where she lives in and works at a manga cafe called Hedgehog.
Rie Amamiya (天宮 梨絵, Amamiya Rie)
Voiced by: Saho Shirasu
A second-year student. Her mother is the school's chair, while her family owns the school. She is a manga fan, and became interested in Meiko after mistaking her from a manga artist with the same name.
Marika Suzuki (鈴木 万里花, Suzuki Marika)
Voiced by: Chiharu
A second-year high school student who lives in and works at Hedgehog. Because she is sensitive to temperatures, she does not like wearing lower clothing. She is also a streamer. She lives in Hedgehog as she is on bad terms with her family due to their disapproval of her streaming career.
Neo Nakano (中埜 音緒, Nakano Neo)
Voiced by: Miyari Nemoto
A second-year high school student who lives in and works at Hedgehog. She is knowledgeable about technology and aims to become a professional gamer.
Michika Narumi (成海 みちか, Narumi Michika)
Voiced by: Momoka Terasawa
A first-year high school student who works part-time at a cat cafe located on the first floor of the same building as Hedgehog.
Magical Momorin Goda (剛田 魔法桃鈴, Gōda Majikarumomorin)
Voiced by: Kaori Maeda
An 18-year-old woman who takes a liking to Hedgehog. Due to her love of history, she became the younger person to ever obtain a license as an antique appraiser. She is referred to as "Suzu" (すず).
Gao (ガオ)
Voiced by: Chiwa Saitō
A popular streamer who Marika sees as a rival. Unbeknownst to Marika, Gao is a big fan of hers.
Belna (ベルナ, Beruna)
Voiced by: Ran Koba
A maid and spy who is devoted to Gao. Due to said devotion, she takes up residence at Hedgehog to take care of Marika per Gao's request.
Miori Morita (森田 水織, Morita Miori)
Voiced by: Natsumi Murakami
Meiko's younger sister who is a middle school student. While she comes across as being aloof towards Meiko, she actually deeply admires her older sister.

== Media ==
=== Manga ===
The series is written and illustrated by Kumako Hisama. It was originally released as a guest series in Houbunsha's Manga Time Kirara magazine on May 9, 2018, before beginning serialization in the same magazine on December 7 of that year. Five tankōbon volumes have been published as of May 2026.

No.	Release date	ISBN
1	November 27, 2019	978-4-8322-7139-5
2	February 25, 2021	978-4-8322-7253-8
3	September 27, 2022	978-4-8322-7398-6
4	July 26, 2025	978-4-8322-9650-3
5	May 27, 2026	978-4-8322-9722-7

=== Anime ===
An anime television series adaptation was announced in Manga Time Kirara on July 9, 2025. It was produced by PRA and directed by Toshinori Watanabe, with series composition handled by Tatsuya Takahashi, who also wrote the episode screenplays with Kana Yamada, and characters designed by Fumiya Uehara, who also served as chief animation director with Minefumi Harada, Yuki Yabuta, and Saori Sakiguchi. Monaca composed the music. The series aired from April 12 to June 21, 2026, on the Animazing!!! programming block on all ANN affiliates, including ABC and TV Asahi. (Note: ABC and TV Asahi listed the series premiere at 26:00 on April 11, 2026, which is effectively April 12 at 2:00 a.m. JST.) The opening theme song is "Ciao Ciao" (チャオチャオ), performed by Sophià la Mode, while the ending theme song is "Yawayawa Nerd Chō FreQuency" (やわやわNERD 超FreQuency), performed by Mugendai Mewtype of the BanG Dream! franchise.

Remow licensed the series for simultaneous airing worldwide on the It's Anime YouTube channel, as well as OceanVeil in North America and Rakuten Viki in North America, the United Kingdom, and Australasia.

==== Episodes ====
No.	Title	Directed by (Note: Production staff information is taken from the ending credits of each episode.)	Written by	Storyboard by	Original release date
1	"Moving to Tokyo? What'll Happen to Meiko?"; Transliteration: "Masaka no Jōkyō! Dōnaru Meiko!?" (Japanese: まさかの上京！ どうなる芽衣子!?)	Toshinori Watanabe	Tatsuya Takahashi	Toshinori Watanabe	April 12, 2026
2	"Hedgehog is Closing? Gotta Turn It Around!"; Transliteration: "Hejjihoggu Heiten!? Keiei o Tatenaose" (Japanese: ヘッジホッグ閉店!? 経営を立て直せ!)	Youhei Honma	Kana Yamada	Youhei Honma	April 19, 2026 (Note: This episode aired at 2:30 a.m. JST, 30 minutes after the original air time on ANN.)
3	"Rivals! Cat VS Hedgehog"; Transliteration: "Innen! Neko Bāsasu Harinezumi" (Japanese: 因縁! 猫VSハリネズミ)	Shiho Takahashi	Tatsuya Takahashi	Shiho Takahashi	April 26, 2026
4	"It's Summer! It's Hot! Let's go to the Tropics!"; Transliteration: "Natsuda! Atsui zo! Nangoku e GO!" (Japanese: 夏だ！暑いぞ！南国へGO！)	Ruvu Ōshima	Kana Yamada	Toshinori Watanabe	May 3, 2026
5	"Meiko's Homecoming"; Transliteration: "Meiko, Hōmukamingu" (Japanese: 芽衣子、ホームカミング)	Masao Arai	Tatsuya Takahashi	Toshinori Watanabe	May 10, 2026
6	"The Magic Appraiser ☆ Magical Momorin"; Transliteration: "Mahou no Kanteishi ☆ Majikaru Momorin" (Japanese: 魔法の鑑定士☆マジカルモモリン)	Toshinori Watanabe	Kana Yamada	Toshinori Watanabe	May 17, 2026
7	"Enjoying Manga Cafe Life"; Transliteration: "Mankitsu Kurashi" (Japanese: まんきつ暮らし)	Toshinori Watanabe	Tatsuya Takahashi	Youhei Honma	May 24, 2026
8	"Aiming for the Top! The Amamiya Sports Festival"; Transliteration: "Mezase Yūshō! Ten'nyo Dai-Undōkai" (Japanese: めざせ優勝！天女大運動会)	Shiho Takahashi	Kana Yamada	Shiho Takahashi	May 31, 2026
9	"Marika the Target"; Transliteration: "Nerawareta Marika" (Japanese: 狙われた万里花)	Toshinori Watanabe	Kana Yamada	Toshinori Watanabe	June 7, 2026
10	"Returning to Sacred Ground"; Transliteration: "Seichi @ Kijun" (Japanese: 聖地@帰巡)	Shun Nagasawa	Tatsuya Takahashi	Toshinori Watanabe	June 14, 2026
11	"Manga Cafe Hedgehog"; Transliteration: "Manga Kissa Hejjihoggu" (Japanese: 漫画喫茶ヘッジホッグ)	Toshinori Watanabe	Tatsuya Takahashi	Toshinori Watanabe	June 21, 2026
