= Sally Amaki =

Singer and voice actress (born 2000)

Sally Amaki 天城サリー
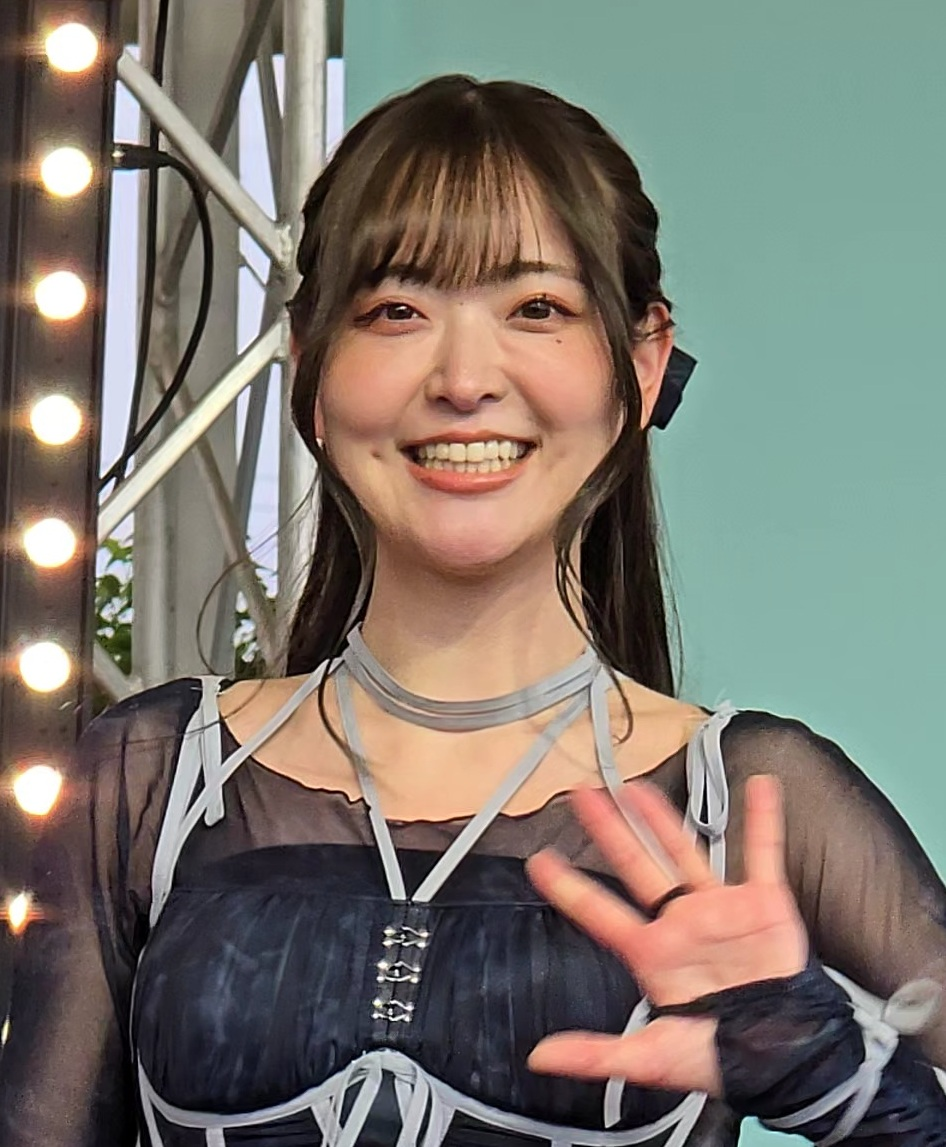
- Amaki in 2025

Background information
- Born: April 26, 2000 (age 26); Los Angeles, California, U.S.
- Origin: Japan
- Genre: J-pop
- Occupations: Singer; voice actress
- Instrument: Vocals
- Years active: 2017–present
- Label: Sony Music Records
- Member of: 22/7

Sally Amaki (天城サリー, Amaki Sarī; born April 26, 2000) is a singer and voice actress based in Tokyo, Japan. She is a member of the voice acting idol group 22/7, which debuted in 2017, and is the group's "overseas representative". Within the group, she appears both as herself and as the animated character Sakura Fujima, for whom she provides the voice and motion capture.

In addition to being a member of 22/7, Amaki also provides the voices for other characters, including Akubi from Pandora to Akubi, Carol Olston from Tomo-chan Is a Girl!, Kiriko from Overwatch 2, and Peni Parker from Marvel Rivals.

== Career ==
In 2016, Amaki moved from Los Angeles to Japan by herself to pursue voice acting, as she felt that anime brought a positive influence on her life and wanted to contribute back. She partially took and failed many auditions due to having little knowledge of Japanese. However, in December 2016, she successfully for Yasushi Akimoto's idol and anime girl group project – later named 22/7 – despite her reluctance to become a singer apart from becoming a voice actress.

Since the group's introduction, Amaki has attracted an international audience after a montage of her joking around in English went viral on Twitter. After noticing Amaki had drawn in a large overseas fan base, her character was rewritten as an English speaker. In May 2018, she and several other members of 22/7 have started their official Twitter accounts, where Amaki posts tweets in both English and Japanese. In June 2018, she became involved in 22/7's virtual YouTube marketing campaign as Sakura Fujima. In July 2018, Amaki and fellow members Mei Hanakawa and Reina Miyase appeared at Anime Expo 2018 in Los Angeles.

On June 19, 2019, Amaki revealed that she has suffered from social anxiety disorder since she joined the group and announced that she would be absent from handshake events while receiving treatment.

In March 2023, Amaki and presenter Jon Kabira hosted the 7th Crunchyroll Anime Awards in its first live ceremony in Tokyo. In 2025, Amaki played the role of Lily Baker in the anime series Cultural Exchange with a Game Centre Girl. She was one of two singers of the opening theme "Futari no Start Button" (ふたりのスタートボタン, Futari no Sutāto Botan; lit. 'Our Start Button'), and she sang the ending theme "Amusing Flavor".

== Personal life ==
Both of Amaki's parents are Japanese who emigrated to, met, and get married in Los Angeles – making her a second generation Japanese American (nisei). She has an older brother. Prior to moving to Japan, Amaki had trained in ballet and ice skating, the latter with the late Olympic figure skater Denis Ten. She speaks Japanese and English fluently, with the latter being her first language, as well as some French and Spanish.

Amaki is a supporter of LGBT rights. She was also has a social anxiety disorder.

== Filmography ==
=== Television ===
Year	Title	Role	Notes
2017	Dive!!	Elementary school student	Voice
2018–present	22/7 Keisanchu	Herself, Sakura Fujima	22/7's variety show
2019	Kaguya-sama: Love Is War	Betsy Beltoise	Voice; episode 4
2019	Fate/Grand Order - Absolute Demonic Front: Babylonia	Little girl	Voice; episode 5
2020	22/7	Sakura Fujima	
2020	Hypnosis Mic: Division Rap Battle: Rhyme Anima	Women B	Voice; episode 1
2021	Joran: The Princess of Snow and Blood	Satsuki	Voice; episode 12
2021	Peach Boy Riverside	Beretto	Voice
2021	Let's Make a Mug Too: Second Kiln	Jimena Valdez	Voice
2022	Bocchi the Rock!	Eliza Shimizu	Voice; episode 10
2023	Tomo-chan Is a Girl!	Carol Olston	Voice in Japanese and English versions
2023	UniteUp!	Hana Kashii, Saki Kashii	Voice
2023	World Dai Star	Kathrina Griebel	Voice
2024	Jellyfish Can't Swim in the Night	Akari Suzumura	Voice
2025	Cultural Exchange with a Game Centre Girl	Lily Baker	Voice
2025	May I Ask for One Final Thing?	Rosalia	Voice
2026	Needy Girl Overdose	OMGkawaiiAngel/Ame	Voice in Japanese and English versions; uncredited until episode 13

=== Original net animation ===
Year	Title	Role	Notes
2018	The Diary of Our Days	Sakura Fujima	22/7 first animation before the TV series

=== Film ===
Year	Title	Role	Notes
2019	Pandora to Akubi	Akubi	Main character; voice role
2021	The House of the Lost on the Cape	Zashiki-warashi	Voice role
2026	Expelled from Paradise: Resonance from the Heart	Raguel	Voice role

=== Video games ===
Year	Title	Role	Notes
2020	Magia Record: Puella Magi Madoka Magica Side Story	Ashley Taylor	Voice in Japanese and English versions
2021	Kimi wa Yukima ni Koinegau		
2022	Overwatch 2	Kiriko Kamori	English version
2023	World Dai Star: Yume no Stellarium	Kathrina Griebel	
2024	Marvel Rivals	Peni Parker	Voice in English and Japanese versions
2024	Puella Magi Madoka Magica: Magia Exedra	Ashley Taylor	
2024	Astral Party	KAngel, Ame	
2025	Ratatan	Pyokorappa	
2026	Azur Lane	Bennington	Voice role

=== Others ===
Year	Title	Role	Notes
2021	Sacra Music	Sacra Rokuban-cho	Official character; Voice
2022	Project Cold	Asumi Sakaki	
