= Chiharu (voice actress) =

Japanese voice actress

- 千春
- Born: Chiharu Terakawa (寺川 千春, Terakawa Chiharu); April 10, 1995 (age 31); Kobe, Hyōgo Prefecture, Japan
- Other names: Chiharu Hokaze (帆風 千春, Hokaze Chiharu)
- Occupations: Voice actress, singer
- Years active: 2017–present
- Agent: Hibiki
- Known for: 22/7 as Reika Sato; Ichijyoma Mankitsu Gurashi! as Marika Suzuki
- Relatives: Aimi

Chiharu Terakawa (寺川 千春, Terakawa Chiharu; born April 10, 1995), known professionally under the mononym Chiharu, is a Japanese voice actress and singer from Kobe who is affiliated with Hibiki. She debuted in the industry in the 2017 under the stage name Chiharu Hokaze (帆風 千春, Hokaze Chiharu), voicing Reika Satō in the mixed-media project 22/7 from 2017 to 2021. She is the younger sister of voice actress and singer Aimi.

== Biography ==
Chiharu was born in Hyōgo Prefecture on April 10, 1995. She originally aspired to become a childcare worker, studying at the same junior college as future voice actress Hina Suguta, whom she became friends with during their studies. Chiharu had an interest in anime and voice acting, being familiar with series such as Kuroko's Basketball and crediting that manga for helping her build her friendship with Suguta. In 2015, she participated in an audition held by the talent agency 81 Produce, but was ultimately not selected. In 2016, she auditioned to be a part of 22/7, a new mixed-media project created by AKB48 creator Yasushi Akimoto, being selected as among the 12 winners among 10,325 applicants. After being cast as the character Reika Satō, she was initially referred to only as "Contestant No. 2", being given the stage name Chiharu Hokaze following a public naming competition and a Showroom livestream in March 2017. In 2018, she was chosen to become 22/7's leader, a position she kept until she graduated from the group in February 2021. She also voiced Reika in the project's 2020 anime television series.

In September 2021, Chiharu joined the talent agency Hibiki, during which she was confirmed to be the younger sister of fellow voice actress and singer Aimi. In 2025, she voiced the character Suzune Rokuōin in the anime series Cardfight!! Vanguard Divinez. In 2026, she voiced the characters Marika Suzuki in Ichijyoma Mankitsu Gurashi! and Shiori Aizawa in Magical Girl Lyrical Nanoha Exceeds Gun Blaze Vengeance. She has also been cast as the character Natsume Izawa, a member of the in-universe band Millsage, in the BanG Dream! franchise.

== Filmography ==
=== Anime ===
2020

- 22/7, Reika Satō

2024

- As a Reincarnated Aristocrat, I'll Use My Appraisal Skill to Rise in the World, Kreiz Louvent

2025

- Cardfight!! Vanguard Divinez, Suzune Rokuōin

2026

- Ichijyoma Mankitsu Gurashi!, Marika Suzuki
- Magical Girl Lyrical Nanoha Exceeds Gun Blaze Vengeance, Shiori Aizawa

=== Video games ===
- BanG Dream! Our Notes, Natsume Izawa
- D4DJ: Groovy Mix, Hitomi Nakamori
