= Regalia: The Three Sacred Stars =

Japanese anime series

- Key visual

レガリア The Three Sacred Stars (Regaria Za Surī Seikuriddo Sutāzu)
- Genre: Mecha, Alternative History, Science Fiction
- Created by: Delegation of Enastoria
- Anime television series
- Directed by: Susumu Tosaka
- Produced by: Hiroshi Kawamura; Kōji Hyakutake; Takema Okamura; Fuminori Yamazaki; Kozue Kaneniwa; Yasuhiro Nakajima; Tetsuya Tsuchihashi; Tomoyuki Ohashi; Yukihiro Itō; Eriko Aoki; Yumi Wakabayashi
- Written by: Keigo Koyanagi
- Music by: Ryō Takahashi
- Studio: Actas
- Licensed by: AUS: Madman Entertainment; NA: Funimation
- Original network: AT-X, Tokyo MX, Sun TV, BS Fuji
- Original run: 7 July 2016 – 24 November 2016
- Episodes: 13

Regalia: The Three Sacred Stars (レガリア The Three Sacred Stars, Regaria Za Surī Seikuriddo Sutāzu) is a Japanese anime series produced by Actas, directed by Susumu Tosaka and written by Keigo Koyanagi, featuring character designs by Kimitake Nishio based on QP:flapper's original designs. It premiered on 7 July 2016. Infinite and Bandai Namco Entertainment are part of the production committee.

== Plot ==
Twelve years ago in the Kingdom of Rimgarde, a big incident left an unsolved mystery that has begun to fade from people's memories. Time passes, and sisters Yui and Rena Asteria live a peaceful life in the Enastoria Empire, but they become involved in a vortex of destiny when a mecha attacks Enastoria.

== Characters ==
=== Main characters ===
Yuinshiel Asteria (ユインシエル・アステリア, Yuinshieru Asuteria)
Voiced by: Kaede Hondo (Japanese); Amber Lee Connors (English)
Rena's adoptive little sister and Regalia pilot. She is the main protagonist and the empress of Enastoria, who is called "Yui" by her friends.
Magna Alecto (マグナ・アレクト, Maguna Arekuto) / Rena Asteria (レナ・アステリア, Rena Asuteria)
Voiced by: Ayane Sakura (Japanese); Bryn Apprill (English)
Yui's adoptive big sister and Regalia core. She was only one found after the fall of Rimgarde. After being recovered and waking up in home of Asteria family's home and they took her in. Regardless that she has long since stopped aging, after their parents died and Yui forced to become the empress since she is pure-blood, the latter went through all grades of school and forced herself to mature in order to support Yui, and pretended she was merely petite.
Sara Kleis (サラ・クレイス, Sara Kureisu)
Voiced by: Yurika Kubo (Japanese); Brittany Lauda (English)
Tia's little sister and Regalia pilot.
Aurea Tisis (アウレア・ティシス, Aurea Tishisu) / Tia Kleis (ティア・クレイス, Tia Kureisu)
Voiced by: Yui Ogura (Japanese); Jill Harris (English)
Sara's big sister and Regalia core.
Ingrid Tiesto (イングリッド・ティエスト, Inguriddo Tiesuto)
Voiced by: Asami Seto (Japanese); Kristy Sims (English)
Kei's adoptive sister and Regalia pilot. She is the princess of Rimgarde, the country that was destroyed by the Lux Ex Machina. She had been seeking to bring the one responsible for her country's destruction to justice.
Xeno Megaera (ゼノ・メガエラ, Zeno Megaera) / Kei Tiesto (ケイ・ティエスト, Kei Tiesuto)
Voiced by: Nao Tōyama (Japanese); Jād Saxton (English)
Ingrid's adoptive sister and Regalia. She was found all alone and abandoned by Ingrid, and since then she became close to Ingrid.

=== Enastoria Empire ===
Aoi Konoe (アオイ・コノエ, Aoi Konoe)
Voiced by: Azumi Asakura (Japanese); Heather Walker (English)
The grand chamberlain and Yui's special adviser.
Naru Arisaka (ナル・アリサカ, Naru Arisaka)
Voiced by: Yuka Iguchi (Japanese); Rachel Glass (English)
The press secretary of the Imperial Household and Margaret's special adviser.
Margaret Burnley (マーガレット・バーンリー, Māgaretto Bānrī)
Voiced by: Masako Katsuki (Japanese); Linda Leonard (English)
The prime minister of Enastoria.
Jonathan Marshall (ジョナサン・マーシャル, Jonasan Māsharu)
Voiced by: Hiroshi Yanaka (Japanese); Mark Stoddard (English)
The chairman of the Joint Chiefs of Staff and the general.
Theodore Moore (テオドア・ムーア, Teodoa Mūa)
Voiced by: Hidenari Ugaki (Japanese); Michael Johnson (English)
The imperial Director of Intelligence.
Maya Asteria (マヤ・アステリア, Maya Asuteria)
Voiced by: Noriko Shitaya (Japanese); Morgan Garrett (English)
Yui's late mother, who inspired Ingrid to become a great leader long ago.

=== Republic of Afmaraldo ===
Karim Al Talaqy (カリム・アル・タラキ, Karimuaru Taraki)
Voiced by: Hajime Iijima (Japanese); Randy E. Aguebor (English)
The president of the Republic of Afmaraldo.
Ryu (リュー, Ryū)
Voiced by: Yoko Hikasa (Japanese); Julie Shields (English)
She is engaged to Lowe, whom she is bound to.

=== Others ===
Retsu Narumi (レツ・ナルミ, Retsu Narumi)
Voiced by: Hisako Kanemoto (Japanese); Jessica Peterson (English)
The best friend of Yui, who calls her "Retty". She works at a restaurant with Sara and Tia selling delicious chicken skewers at a food stall.
Johann (ヨハン, Yohan)
Voiced by: Megumi Ogata (Japanese); Luci Christian (English)
A scientist from Rimgarde and main antagonist of the series.
Edmond Morales (エドモンド・モラレス, Edomondo Moraresu)
Voiced by: Taketora (Japanese); Paul Giovanni Ramirez (English)
A man who attacked Rena at the pier.
Johnny Muppet (ジョニー・マペット, Jonī Mapetto)
Voiced by: Junji Majima (Japanese); Josh Grelle (English)
A reporter who posted an internet leak of Yui's classified breast measurements prior to baiting Yui and Rena to a magic show in the outskirts as a trap.
Abel Lundestad (アーベル・ルンテシュタット, Āberu Runteshutatto)
Voiced by: Atsushi Ono (Japanese); Bruce Carey (English)
The head of the military aid of Rimgarde and a former military ambassador in Enastoria. He sacrificed himself when he battled Yui and Rena at a secluded runway.
Noa Kleis (ノア・クレイス, Noa Kureisu)
Voiced by: Kana Asumi (Japanese); Cherami Leigh (English)
Sara and Tia's big sister, who fought to regain control from Johann.
Lux (ルクス, Rukusu)
The creator of the Regalia, who appears in the form of Rena.

== Mecha ==
=== Regalia ===
==== Erinius ====
Alecto (アレクト, Arekuto)
The combat Regalia used by Yui and Magna. Powers include high jumping, an energy right arm that forms shockwaves by punching the ground, charging the left arm with fire, martial arts, charging its hands with electricity and insert red explosive pillars, orange energy beams from soles during flying kicks, forming a dark dome that absorbs matter and emits lightning, a round shield stored on back that can divide into two, five blue crystal spears from the right arm, twin back tendrils, blue flames from the claws, rocket propelling in the elbows, and regeneration by liquid darkness.
Tisis (ティシス, Tishisu)
The combat Regalia used by Aurea and Sara. Powers include a blue energy blade stored in left hip that can charge with lightning for more damage, a crystal sword in right wrist shield that turns objects to ice, high jumping, a snake sword that can form pink lasers and cyclones by spinning fast enough, agility, pink crystal blades in each segment of the snake sword, combining both sword to form a drill-like rocket propelled spear, and erecting a sphered barrier composed of wind.
Megaera (メガエラ, Megaera)
The combat Regalia used by Ingrid and Xeno. Powers include flight, lances stored in each shoulder that can combine at the butt, a green energy blaster in each shoulder that can charge up for more damage, a machine gun stored in each shoulder, shockwaves from the lances when combined, flying green laser guns, a pair of pendulum bladed staffs in each shoulder, and eight green lasers from each wing.
Ektelew Alecto (エクテレウ・アレクト, Ekutereu Arekuto)
The combined form of the three combat Regalia after Lux grants its pilots the keys necessary for fusion that only appears in episode 13. Powers include flight, green energy cutters from the wrists, and spawning gauntlets of gold that emit green crystals for impalement.

==== Enki ====
Lowe (ロウ, Rou)
An old Regalia engaged with Ryu that only appeared in episode 6. Its only known power is spawning water which allowed it to create an oasis in a desert after many years and serves as a resting place for dying Regalia.

==== Others ====
Ohrmazd (オフルマズド, Ofurumazudo)
The ancient Regalia used by Johann to command the orbital elevator Lux Ex Machina that appears in episodes 12 and 13. In child form, powers include flight, four retractable arms with a pink laser cannon in each palm, a circular energy barrier, palm energy spheres that fire purple lasers, and a red torso energy cannon. In adult form, powers include energy fists from the back halo, levitation, teleportation, spawning a ring of humanoid missiles, and turning the back halo into gauntlets.

=== Regalia Gear ===
Miles (ミレス, Miresu)
Edmond's Regalia Gear that appears in episode 1. Powers include a wrecking ball stored in each shoulder, hidden spikes in the wrecking balls, and charging its wrecking balls with electricity.
Joculator (ジョクラトル, Jokuratoru)
Johnny's Regalia Gear that appears in episodes 2 and 3. Powers include razor cards spawned from the hands, giant cards capable of teleporting and turning into glass cases, white balls that form fire birds, agility, smokescreen trap doors, agility, a crook, bomb summoning, and a left arm cape with red energy barrier.
Dux (ドゥクス, Dukusu)
Abel's Regalia Gear that appears in episodes 4 and 5. Powers include super speed, a blade on each wrist, a zweihander stored on the back with an orange laser gun in the blade, and a second green blade in the zweihander that is rocket propelled.
Volare (ウォラーレ, Worāre)
Johann's Regalia Gear that appears in episodes 6, 7, and 8. Powers include flight, transforming into a jet, dozens of flying arrowheads that fire pink lasers, twin chainsaws on each wrist that act as pincer claws, dual back scythes, electric blasts from the hands, red energy cannon from torso that rivals napalm, reformation, and dual torso sonic tendrils.
Primus Pilus (プリムス・ピルス, Purimusu Pirusu)
Noa's Regalia Gear that appears in episodes 9, 10, 11, 12, and 13. Powers include opening wormholes, teleportation, strength, levitation, blue energy cannon in the knuckles, and commanding both Centurios.
Centurio (ケントゥリオ, Kenturio)
Two unmanned Regalia Gears that appear in episodes 9, 10, 11, and 12. Powers include teleportation, a red energy ball cannon, a shield that redirects energy attacks, and levitation.

== Media ==
=== Anime ===
An anime television series animated by studio Actas, began airing on 7 July 2016 premiering on AT-X & Tokyo MX with later broadcasts on Sun TV and BS Fuji. The opening theme "Divine Spell" is sung by TRUE, while the ending theme "Patria" is sung by Minami. The anime has been licensed by Funimation and by Madman Entertainment for streaming. After the broadcast of episode 4, the series' television broadcast has been halted until September 2016 to allow more time for quality improvements. The series restarted its broadcast from the beginning on 1 September 2016. The anime was released across six Blu-ray & DVD volumes.

==== Episode list ====
No.	Official English title (Note: All English titles are taken from Funimation.)	Original release date
1	"Sisters" "Shimai" (姉妹)	7 July 2016
Twelve years ago, two mecha cause mass destruction in the Kingdom of Rimgarde during their intense battle. In the present, Yuinshiel "Yui" Asteria makes breakfast for her adoptive sister Rena Asteria in the Enastoria Empire. With a few hours of free time in the afternoon, Yui invites Rena to hang out after school. While waiting for Yui at a café, Rena encounters Kei Tiesto, who offers to show her what happened twelve years ago. Rena contacts Yui to say goodbye, leaving behind a gift in her absence. At a pier, Rena is confronted by Edmond Morales, who fuses with a Regalia Gear named Miles and prepares to attack. Rena defends herself by transforming into a Regalia named Magna Alecto, but she is easily defeated. Yui then comes to aid Rena, having followed her to the pier. Rena reveals that her real name is Magna Alecto and she is not human, but Yui states that they are still family despite not being related by blood. Letting Yui be the pilot to her core, Rena is eventually able to defeat Edmond. The gift turns out to be a necklace containing the identical ring that Yui wore with Rena during their childhood. During a press conference, Yui is revealed to be the empress of the Enastoria Empire.
2	"Declaration" "Senkoku" (宣告)	14 July 2016
After quelling the public with the assurance that there were no casualties at the pier, Yui answers questions of concern from various reporters, including Johnny Muppet, who asks her to reveal her classified breast measurements. Afterwards, Yui has a meeting with officials Aoi Konoe, Naru Arisaka, Theodore Moore, Margaret Burnley and Jonathan Marshall regarding Rena. Yui and Rena were previously shown photos taken twelve years ago marking the fall of Rimgarde, in which Rena admitted that the mecha depicted in one of the photos was actually Alecto, claiming that Edmond was among the enemies who tried to capture her. With that in mind, Yui is now faced with making a decision on how to settle the matter. The next day, Yui hangs out with her best friend Retsu "Retty" Narumi at the café, where Retty briefly shows Yui an internet leak of her breast measurements. When Retty leaves, Yui is soon approached by Ingrid Tiesto, who departs after Yui refuses to hand over Rena and declares her as a person. Later cornered by Johnny and his "assistant" Johann, Yui is invited to bring Rena to attend a "magic show". Yui and Rena meet with Johnny and Johann in the outskirts, where Johnny fuses with his Regalia Gear named Joculator. After Yui and Rena transform into Alecto, Johnny attacks them using sleight of hand maneuvers. As a final move, Johnny traps Yui and Rena in an inescapable glass box with a time bomb that will detonate in three minutes.
3	"Sincerity" "Magokoro" (真心)	21 July 2016
Yui and Rena breaks through the glass box as soon as the time bomb detonates. After Yui and Rena seemingly defeat Johnny, Johann causes Joculator to self-destruct and melt in a tar pit, leaving Alecto left standing. Suddenly, another Regalia named Aurea Tisis appears and begins to slash at Alecto. When the tar pit engulfs Alecto in a glass dome, Rena momentarily becomes separated from Yui until Tisis smashes through the glass dome and destroys the tar pit before leaving abruptly. The next day, Yui is accompanied by Aoi to a festival. Unbeknownst to Yui, Rena asks a favor from Retty, who is selling delicious chicken skewers at a food stall. Rena wants to use Retty's kitchen in order to bake something special for Yui as a surprise. Yui comes across Sara Kleis running errands for Retty in the streets, while Rena encounters Sara's sister Tia Kleis at a restaurant. After Yui helps Retty and Sara sell out their chicken skewers, they return to the restaurant, where it is revealed that Tia is a Regalia just like Rena. Yui, Rena, Sara, Tia and Retty begin to share a cake that Rena baked in honor of Yui.
4	"Feigned Confidence" "Kyosei" (虚勢)	28 July 2016
In the Rimgarde headquarters, Abel Lundestad tells Ingrid, Kei and Johann that he plans on taking matters into his own hands. Meanwhile, Yui, Rena and the imperial officials identify Ingrid as the princess of Rimgarde, Abel as the personal military aid of Rimgarde and Kei as Ingrid's Regalia. As a request, Yui and Rei personally meet with Abel at a bridge, where Abel demands Yui to hand over Rena. When Yui refuses to comply, Abel questions her duties as an empress. With Rena angered by Abel's choice of words, Yui and Rena transform into Alecto, which forces Abel to fuse with his Regalia Gear named Dux. However, Dux proves to be formidable against Alecto. Sara and Tia transform into Tisis, defending Alecto from Dux, though the bridge is damaged in the process. Dux then retreats to the Rimgarde headquarters as a result. The next day, Sara and Tia urge Rena to seek help from Yui. Aoi takes Yui to see the bridge already under construction, showing that Yui is the reason why the public keeps striving. When Yui finds Rena, they apologize to each other before Yui tells Rena that they need to face Abel once more. Yui requests the imperial officials to lend their support in revealing something to the public.
5	"Counterattack" "Hangeki" (反撃)	29 September 2016
Early in the morning, Yui goes for a jog and briefly visits Sara, Tia and Retty at the food stall, giving the sense of a final goodbye. At the Rimgarde headquarters, Abel prepares for battle and says his final goodbye to Ingrid, Kei and Johann. The imperial officials make preparations to transport Yui and Rena via helicopter to a secluded runway, where Abel is expected to show up. While Yui expresses gratefulness for being the empress, Rena begins to have self-doubt in protecting Yui. At nightfall, the public gather at an auditorium and watch a televised view of the impending battle. Sara, Tia and Retty are among the witnesses. Abel fuses with Dux, while Yui and Rena transform into Alecto. Feeling unable to protect Yui, Rena seeks more power from her inner self, which Rena uses to form a contractual bond with Yui. This grants Yui and Rena enough strength to defeat and kill Abel. Yui and Rena make a stop at the auditorium, where they are greeted with praise from the public.
6	"Divine Machinations" "Jinki" (神機)	6 October 2016
Yui, Rena, Sara, Tia and Retty spend some time together at an indoor swimming pool and then at a hot spring. Later on, Yui learns that it took two thousand years for Sara and Tia to find Rena, meaning that they do not age. Before dinner, Yui receives a call from Aoi, who informs that there is another Regalia located in a different country. The next day, Aoi and Naru escort Yui, Rena, Sara and Tia in the middle of a desert to the Republic of Afmaraldo, where they are greeted by president Karim Al Talaqy. Yui, Rena, Sara and Tia enter a cave, home to the fallen Regalia. The cave leads to an oasis, where they are introduced to a young woman named Ryu, who is engaged to her Regalia named Lowe. It is revealed Lowe is a Regalia type called Enki known for peace, while Alecto and Tisis are a Regalia type called Erinius known for combat. Recalling that a Regalia known as Lux Ex Machina nearly destroyed the entire world before it was sealed away by mankind long ago, Ryu encourages the others to find their own path in the world. As Yui, Rena, Sara and Tia head to Rimgarde via private jet, they are attacked by Johann, who fuses with his Regalia Gear named Volare. Plunging from the loading hatch, Yui and Rena transform into Alecto, while Sara and Tia transform into Tisis.
7	"The Past" "Kako" (過去)	13 October 2016
Alecto and Tisis continue to fall from the sky due to the inability of flight. Before landing in the ruins of Rimgarde, they dodge several of Volare's attacks on the way down. Yui, Rena, Sara and Tia lay low at an abandoned shopping mall, where they decide to set up camp. Yui is impressed by how much Sara and Tia know about camping before they all go to sleep. The next day, Yui, Rena, Sara and Tia meet Kei, who returns to Ingrid at a lower-level bridge. Ingrid reveals that an untrusted scientist caused the fall of Rimgarde by reviving Lux Ex Machina. Piloting Volare, Johann finds the others at the lower-level bridge, prompting Ingrid and Kei to transform into the Regalia named Xeno Megaera in compliance. During the battle, Alecto is left overwhelmed by Volare, while Tisis struggles to fight Megaera. When Alecto and Tisis team up to corner Volare, Megaera snatches Alecto away from the battle. Ingrid secretly tells Yui that Alecto, Tisis and Megaera can create a resonance together, which could free Kei from subservience. Megaera releases Alecto when Volare sets the ruins ablaze.
8	"Returning Home" "Kikan" (帰還)	20 October 2016
Rena survives Johann's sneak attack. After soon discovering that the real Kei exists within them, both Rena and Tia enter the subconscious to find Kei. Rena and Tia witness the memories of Kei, who was adopted by Ingrid prior to being experimented on by Johann. When Alecto and Tisis first engaged in battle, Kei released an aura that caused the fall of Rimgarde. In the aftermath, Kei became subservient to Johann, leaving Ingrid no choice but to follow them. Meanwhile, Yui and Sara are left to pilot Alecto and Tisis. Although they manage to damage Volare on their own, Volare lashes back with a vengeance. While Yui realizes that Johann caused the fall of Rimgarde, Johann in Volare prepares to kill Yui in Alecto, but Ingrid in Magaera distracts Johann long enough to save Yui. As Rena and Tia manage to find Kei held in bondage, the three of them create a resonance together by bonding their cores, thus freeing Kei from subservience. Rena, Tia and Kei then return to Yui, Sara and Ingrid. Volare is momentarily overwhelmed by Alecto and Tisis on the ground, while Magaera delivers the final blow in the sky, finally eradicating Volare from existence.
9	"Succession" "Keishō" (継承)	27 October 2016
Rena invites Ingrid and Kei to stay in Enastoria, while the Enastoria officials entrust Yui to look after Ingrid. Yui, Rena and Kei catch Ingrid wearing a frilly dress before Retty meets Ingrid and Kei for the first time. After dinner, Yui and Ingrid watch the sunset together, while Rena, Sara, Tia and Retty eavesdrop nearby. Ingrid reveals that she chickened out from giving a celebratory speech for the enthronement ceremony of Yui's late mother Maya Asteria when Yui was a little girl, in which Maya inspired Ingrid to become a good leader for her country. Yui learns that Ingrid and Abel were aware of Rena being adopted by Maya in Enastoria after the fall of Rimgarde, but time was running out when Johann targeted Rena. In fact, Yui and Rena were intentionally chosen to bond as Regalia pilot and core despite Abel being sacrificed in the process. By nightfall, Ingrid embraces Yui for being like Maya. Johann then makes a sudden appearance, summoning a Regalia Gear named Primus Pilus and two unmanned Regalia Gear named Centurio to surround Enastoria, though Yui and Rena are unable to transform into Alecto since their previous battle. A wormhole engulfs Tisis and Magaera with Johann controlling Primus Pilus and Centurio. Rena is also absorbed by Lux Ex Machina, while an unconscious Yui is left behind. Yui later wakes up in her bed with Rena nowhere in sight.
10	"Isolation" "Koritsu" (孤立)	3 November 2016
Yui has an unsettling feeling when she is unable to return home or contact Aoi after school. In the evening, Yui finds Retty outside the restaurant, though Rei passes out after having no recollection of Yui, who then tucks Retty in bed before departing. As it begins to rain at night, Yui recalls when Maya gave matching rings for Yui and Rena to wear during childhood. With renewed determination to save her friends, Yui finds Sara and Tia in an alley, and they seek shelter in an apartment. During the night before, Johann took Rena, Tisis and Magaera above the atmosphere inside the orbital elevator Lux Ex Machina, where Johann revealed that Lux Ex Machina was unsealed after Kei was freed from subservience. Johann then stretched Lux Ex Machina over the entire planet, gradually targeting people's memories of Yui. When Magaera and Tisis are each unable to stop Johann, Rena transforms into Alecto, though Johann traps Alecto in a tar pit. It is revealed that Sara and Tia's big sister Noa Kleis was piloting Primus Pilus, briefly regaining control to send Tisis back to Enastoria. In the present, Yui suggests for Sara and Tia to eat a hot meal and get a goodnight's rest in order to muster enough stamina for a rescue mission. The next morning, Yui, Sara and Tia encounter Rena's inner self wearing Rena's ring.
11	"Prison" "Rōgoku" (牢獄)	10 November 2016
As Magaera fights Primus Pilus and Centurio, Rena's inner self brings Yui, Sara and Tia inside Lux Ex Machina. Sara and Tia transform into Tisis to assist Magaera, while Yui treads through the tar pit to reach Rena. During their fight, Noa controlled by Johann tells Ingrid and Kei that sacrifices were needed to accept the power of the Regalia, which were created by Lux. However, Lux Ex Machina was man-made so sacrifices were not required. Blaming Yui for Rena being stuck as Alecto, Johann declares that all souls on the entire planet now belong to him. As Yui sinks inside the tar pit, Johann says that Yui will live in darkness. Tisis arrives to assist Magaera in battling Primus Pilus and Centurio. Within her subconscious, Rena finds Yui, who fears that Rena will be permanently stuck as Alecto if they go back to the real world. After Rena praises Yui for her perseverance, the two make due on their promise to work together in harmony, restoring them as Regalia pilot and core. While Magaera solely takes on Primus Pilus and Centurio, Tisis prepares to unleash a grand attack.
12	"Reclamation" "Hyōryū" (奪還)	17 November 2016
Tisis and Magaera manage to take out Centurio, leaving Primus Pilus defenseless. Breaking free from Johann's control, Noa urges Sara and Tia to destroy the orb of Lux Ex Machina, which is not an energy ring but a prison for human souls. When Tisis is unable to fully penetrate the orb, Magaera gets the job done instead while Tisis releases the human souls. Johann then transforms into the ancient Regalia named Ohrmazd, which can command Lux Ex Machina at will. Just when Tisis, Magaera and Primus Pilus are overwhelmed by Ohrmazd, Alecto arrives and attempts to put a stop to Ohrmazd. Rena's inner self shields Alecto in black flames as Alecto slowly approaches Ohrmazd. While Rena boasts that Yui has the power of humanity on her side, Johann believes that he has the power to do anything on his own no matter where or when. As Yui realizes that Johann is scared of being alone, Alecto gains the strength to defeat Ohrmazd and break Lux Ex Machina. However, Johann expresses his hatred for humanity and his thirst to kill Yui as Ohrmazd evolves into a new form.
13	"Family" "Kazoku" (家族)	24 November 2016
Alecto is seemingly defeated during an intense battle against Ohrmazd. In the subconscious, Yui and Rena find themselves in a desert. They realize that Rena's inner self is actually Lux, who takes them through a portal that leads to a meadow, thus restoring Yui and Rena again as Regalia pilot and core. Lux uses her power to combine Alecto, Tisis and Magaera into a new form, a Regalia named Ektelew Alecto. During the fight, Yui, Rena, Sara, Tia, Ingrid and Kei all proclaim their strength in numbers. This allows Ektelew Alecto to defeat Ohrmazd once and for all. In his dying breath, Johann wishes to die alone. Yui gives her necklace to Lux, who then gives it to Johann before taking him into the afterlife. Lux Ex Machina begins to crumble as Ektelew Alecto returns to Enastoria. Yui jokingly tells Rena that she plans to take a bath and eat a hot meal when she goes home.
