= 22/7 (group) =

Japanese idol girl group

- 22/7 characters. From top left: Miyako, Reika, Akane, Jun, Sakura, Miu, Nicole, and Ayaka. (Not pictured: Yuki, Tsubomi, and Mikami)

Background information
- Origin: Japan
- Genre: J-pop
- Years active: 2017–present
- Labels: SME Records; Columbia Records
- Members: Sally Amaki (Sakura Fujima); Uta Kawase (Nicole Saitō); Nao Aikawa (Sora Nishiura); Mao Asaoka (Touko Kiryu); Satsuki Shiina (Sumika Orihara); Ema Tsukishiro (Mizuki Himuro); Rino Mochizuki (Honoka Sera); Mirei Orimoto; Misaki Kitahara; Alice Kurosaki; Mana Tachibana; Iko Hiyama; Haruka Mikumo; Iori Minami; Julie Yoshizawa
- Past members: Nagomi Saijō (Miu Takigawa); Mei Hanakawa (Nicole Saitō); Chiharu Hokaze (Reika Sato); Mizuha Kuraoka (Miyako Kono); Urara Takasuji (Yuki Tojo); Ruri Umino (Jun Toda); Aina Takeda (Tsubomi Hiiragi); Reina Miyase (Ayaka Tachikawa); Kanae Shirosawa (Akane Maruyama); Oto Amaya (Toa Yagami); Mina Kiyoi (Kaede Nagamine); Moe Suzuhana (Mikami Kamiki); Runa Shijo (Hotaru Ichinose)
- Website: www.nanabunnonijyuuni.com

22/7 (ナナブンノニジュウニ, Nanabun no Nijūni) is a Japanese idol girl group formed through a media mix project by Yasushi Akimoto, Aniplex, and Sony Music Records, which included the members performing as a musical group and an anime television series based on their characters. The members consist of voice actresses who provide the voice and motion capture for their characters. The group originally consisted of 11 members and currently consists of 15.

Eight new members joined 22/7 in February 2022, including Nao Aikawa, Mao Asaoka, Oto Amaya, Mina Kiyoi, Satsuki Shiina, Luna Shijo, Emma Tsukishiro and Rino Mochizuki. This led to the group increasing to 14 members.The group then experienced more changes to its membership. A third generation audition was conducted in December 2025 and eight new members were welcomed: Mirei Orimoto, Misaki Kitahara, Alice Kurosaki, Mana Tachibana, Iko Hiyama, Haruka Mikumo, Iori Minami and Julie Yoshizawa.The eight new members also started their activities as a new third generation unit: 22/7_the 3rd.

== History ==
=== 2017–2018: Debut, 22/7 Keisanchū, final three characters revealed ===
An audition for eight characters, which included both a CD debut and an anime, was held until December 17, 2016, with the final round taking place on December 24, 2016. On December 25, 2016, the idol group name was revealed as 22/7, which was chosen because it is an approximation to the mathematical constant $\pi$, a transcendental number that represents their concept as "idols transcending through dimensions." Among 10,325 applicants, eleven voice actresses were chosen through voting, with only the first eight characters announced. The group held their debut showcase on June 16, 2017, and an animated adaptation was announced during their first live event on July 22, 2017. 22/7's first single, "Boku wa Sonzai Shiteinakatta", was released on August 22, 2017, with the jacket designs illustrated by Yukiko Horiguchi. The music video was animated by Tatsunoko Production.

On April 11, 2018, 22/7 released their second single, "Shampoo no Nioi ga Shita", with the CD visuals designed by Horiguchi again. A series of animated character shorts were also released. To promote the group's upcoming activities, 22/7 launched individual social media channels for the characters, including YouTube. 22/7's variety show, 22/7 Keisanchū, was broadcast on Tokyo MX beginning July 7, 2018.

22/7's third single, "Rikaisha", was released on August 22, 2018. The song was promoted during their annual live event on July 22, 2018, where they also announced Chiharu Hokaze had been elected the leader of the group. "Rikaisha" debuted at #7 on the Oricon Daily Singles Chart. On September 21, 2018, the three characters for the remaining members of the group were revealed during a promotional event.

=== 2019–2021: Departure of Hanakawa, 22/7's anime adaptation, graduation of first generation members ===
On July 22, 2019, the music video for their fourth single, "Nani mo Shite Agerarenai" was released, becoming the first of their releases to include all eleven characters. The single was released on August 21, 2019, with the disc debuting in 4th with 29,000 units sold in its first week on the Oricon Weekly Singles Chart. On December 11, 2019, Mei Hanakawa announced that she was leaving the group due to health issues. Hanakawa's final performance with the group was held on December 24, 2019, where Uta Kawase was introduced as a new member taking over the role of Nicole Saitō.

The anime adaptation by the same name 22/7 premiered on January 11, 2020, and finished airing on March 28 of the same year. It was animated by A-1 Pictures and directed by Takao Abo.

In February 2020, Takatsuji and Kuraoka went on hiatus due to poor health; Takatsuji resumed activities with the group on May 15 while Kuraoka returned to the group in September 2020. On December 1, 2020, Takeda went on hiatus to focus on her studies. On December 23, 2020, Hokaze announced she was leaving the group to pursue voice acting full-time, her final release with the group being "Boku ga Motteru Mono nara", which was released on February 28, 2021. On March 22, 2021, it was announced Takeda would return on April 10, 2021.

The remaining eight members continued to perform activities. On September 29, 2021, Umino and Kuraoka announced they were leaving the group in November while Takeda announced she was leaving in December. Umino stated her reason for leaving is to pursue voice acting full-time; Kuraoka stated it was to find a career path suitable for her; and Takeda stated she wanted to pursue a career as a model and television personality. On November 2, 2021, it was announced that Takatsuji would be leaving the group following a series of unexplained absences from work. Following the departures of the five members, the project announced on December 27, 2021, that they were retiring the five characters played by them.

== Characters ==
=== Current ===
Nicole Saitō (斎藤 ニコル, Saitō Nikoru)
Voiced by: Mei Hanakawa (2017–2019), Uta Kawase (2019–present)
Nicole is a 16-year-old girl. She was designed by Kurehito Misaki.
Sakura Fujima (藤間 桜, Fujima Sakura)
Voiced by: Sally Amaki
Nicknamed "Ranran", Sakura is the 16-year-old daughter of a good family. She has a sunny personality with a dark side. Sakura was not originally written as an English speaker, but after noticing Amaki had drawn in a large overseas fanbase, she was rewritten as an English speaker who had grown up overseas. She was designed by Kantoku.

=== Retired ===
Miu Takigawa (滝川 みう, Takigawa Miu)
Voiced by: Nagomi Saijo
A girl who develops an inferior complex, Miu serves as the main protagonist of the anime series. She is a 16-year-old girl from Saitama Prefecture who is distinguishable from bangs that covered her eyes most of the time. Miu was designed by Yukiko Horiguchi.
Reika Satō (佐藤 麗華, Satō Reika)
Voiced by: Chiharu Hokaze (2017–2021)
Reika is a 17-year-old honor student who is part of student council. She was designed by Hirokazu Koyama. The character was retired on December 27, 2021.
Miyako Kōno (河野 都, Kōno Miyako)
Voiced by: Mizuha Kuraoka (2017–2021)
Miyako is an energetic 17-year-old girl from Osaka who speaks Kansai dialect. She was designed by Mieko Hosoi. The character was retired on December 27, 2021.
Yuki Tojo (東条悠希, Tōjō Yūki)
Voiced by: Urara Takatsuji (2017–2021)
Yuki is a 15-year-old tomboy. She was designed by Akio Watanabe. She was revealed as a character in September 2018. The character was retired on December 27, 2021.
Jun Toda (戸田 ジュン, Toda Jun)
Voiced by: Ruri Umino (2017–2021)
Jun is a 15-year-old high class girl. She was designed by Masayoshi Tanaka. The character was retired on December 27, 2021.
Tsubomi Hiragi (柊つぼみ, Hīragi Tsubomi)
Voiced by: Aina Takeda (2017–2021)
Tsubomi is a 17-year-old girl. She was designed by Mel Kishida. She was revealed as a character in September 2018. The character was retired on December 27, 2021.
Ayaka Tachikawa (立川 絢香, Tachikawa Ayaka)
Voiced by: Reina Miyase (2017–2023)
Ayaka is an aggressive and militant 17-year-old girl. She was designed by Koharu Sakura.
Akane Maruyama (丸山 あかね, Maruyama Akane)
Voiced by: Kanae Shirosawa
Akane is a 16-year-old girl whose personality resembles that of an aloof robot. However, under this face, she is a very hard-working and cheerful girl. She was designed by Tometa Ohara.
Toa Yagami (やがみとあ, Yagami Toa)
Voiced by: Oto Amaya
Toa is a 15-year-old girl from Kanagawa with an upbeat personality. She was designed by Yukiko Horiguchi. She was revealed as a character in April 2020. She is one of the "Nananiji Chapter 2" characters. It was announced on August 28, 2023, that the character would be retired on August 31, 2023, following the voice actress's departure from the group.
Kaede Nagamine (永峰楓, Nagamine Kaede)
Voiced by: Mina Kiyoi
Kaede is an energetic girl from Kanagawa. She was designed by Nari Teshima. She was revealed as a character in April 2020. She is one of the "Nananiji Chapter 2" characters. It was announced on November 28, 2023, that the character would be retired on December 7 following the voice actress's worsening health issues.
Mikami Kamiki (神木みかみ, Kamiki Mikami)
Voiced by: Moe Suzuhana
Mikami is a 16-year-old girl with slow pace who came from Kyoto and speaks in Kyoto dialect. She was designed by Kouhaku Kuroboshi. She was revealed as a character in September 2018. The character was retired on August 31, 2024, following the voice actress's departure from the group.

== Discography ==
=== Studio albums ===
Title	Details	Peak chart positions		Sales
Title	Details	JPN	JPN Hot	Sales
An Eternal Prime Number Named 11. (11という名の永遠の素数, 11 to iu na no Eien no Sosou)	Released: July 14, 2021; Label: Sony Music Records; Formats: CD, Blu-ray, digital download, streaming	2	2	JPN: 54,876
Tabibitozan (旅人算)	Released: November 22, 2023; Label: Sony Music Records; Formats: CD, Blu-ray, digital download, streaming	3	3	JPN: 34,634
ABC Conjecture (ABC予想, ABC Yosou)	Released: December 10, 2025; Label: Sony Music Records; Formats: CD, Blu-ray, digital download, streaming	2	32	JPN: 21,651

=== Singles ===
List of singles, with selected chart positions and sales
Title	Year	Peak chart positions		Sales	Album
Title	Year	JPN	JPN Hot	Sales	Album
"Boku wa Sonzai Shiteinakatta" (僕は存在していなかった)	2017	10	52	JPN: 5,000	An Eternal Prime Number Named 11.
"Shampoo no Nioi ga Shita" (シャンプーの匂いがした)	2018	8	18	JPN: 9,700	An Eternal Prime Number Named 11.
"Rikaisha" (理解者)	2018	14	30	JPN: 12,100	An Eternal Prime Number Named 11.
"Nani mo Shite Agerarenai" (何もしてあげられない)	2019	4	15	JPN: 30,637	An Eternal Prime Number Named 11.
"Muzui" (ムズイ)	2020	2	17	JPN: 34,352	An Eternal Prime Number Named 11.
"Kaze wa Fuiteru ka?" (風は吹いてるか？)	2020	2	8	JPN: 54,140	An Eternal Prime Number Named 11.
"Boku ga Motteru Mono Nara" (僕が持ってるものなら)	2021	2	8	JPN: 73,415	An Eternal Prime Number Named 11.
"Kakusei" (覚醒)	2021	2	3	JPN: 59,306	Tabibitozan
"Kumorizora no Mukō wa Hareteiru" (曇り空の向こうは晴れている)	2022	2	5	JPN: 58,582	Tabibitozan
"Kamisama Datte Kimerarenai" (神様だって決められない)	2023	2	7	JPN: 59,425	Tabibitozan
"Boku wa Konya, Deteiku" (僕は今夜、出て行く)	2023	2	5	JPN: 68,950	Tabibitozan
"Ato de Wakaru Koto" (後でわかること)	2024	2	16	JPN: 37,801	ABC Conjecture
"Yes to No no Aida ni" (YesとNoの間に)	2024	3	6	JPN: 49,544	ABC Conjecture
"Rock wa Shinanai" (ロックは死なない)	2025	6	16	JPN: 39,011	ABC Conjecture
"Anata de Nakucha" (あなたでなくちゃ)	2025	2	6	JPN: 50,301	ABC Conjecture
"Futatsu no Michi" (二つの道)	2026	3	8	JPN: 42,990	TBA
"Call & Response"	2026	6	11	JPN: 30,188	TBA

== Filmography ==
=== Television ===
Year	Title	Network	Notes
2018–present	22/7 Keisanchū (22/7 計算中)	Tokyo MX	22/7's variety show
2020	22/7	Tokyo MX	Anime adaptation
2021	22/7 Kenzanchū (22/7 検算中)	Tokyo MX	22/7's variety show (in person)
