= 22/7 (TV series) =

Japanese anime television series

- Anime key visual featuring the main characters.

ナナブンノニジュウニ (Nanabun no Nijūni)
- Genre: Drama
- Original net animation

The Diary of Our Days
- Directed by: Shin Wakabayashi
- Produced by: Shunichi Tsuji
- Studio: CloverWorks
- Released: March 28, 2018
- Runtime: 1 minute each
- Episodes: 8
- Anime television series
- Directed by: Takao Abo
- Produced by: Yasushi Akimoto (General producer)
- Written by: Chiaki Nagai; Reiji Miyajima
- Music by: Masato Nakayama
- Studio: A-1 Pictures
- Licensed by: NA: Aniplex of America
- Original network: Tokyo MX, GTV, GYT, BS11, ABC, Metele, CS Nippon
- Original run: January 11, 2020 – March 28, 2020
- Episodes: 12
- Manga

22/7 +α
- Written by: Reiji Miyajima
- Illustrated by: Nao Kasai
- Published by: Shogakukan
- Magazine: Sunday Webry
- Original run: January 12, 2020 – March 29, 2020
- Volumes: 2
- icon

22/7 (Japanese: ナナブンノニジュウニ, Hepburn: Nanabun no Nijūni) is a Japanese anime television series created as part of the multimedia project between Yasushi Akimoto, Aniplex, and Sony Music Records. The series features the idol girl group of the same name as their characters.

A short anime on the official YouTube channel of the group, titled The Diary of Our Days, was animated by CloverWorks and aired on March 28, 2018. A TV series is animated by A-1 Pictures and premiered from January 11 to March 28, 2020. A preview for episodes 1 and 2 was scheduled for a special screening on January 4, 2020, also featuring the cast.

In December 2019, a mobile musical rhythm game developed by H.a.n.d. with ForwardWorks and published by Aniplex was announced.

== Synopsis ==
The story focuses on eight girls who are each sent a mysterious invitation from a talent agency called G.I. Productions. Upon assembling together, the girls are immediately told to form an idol group known as 22/7, following orders printed out by a mysterious entity known only as "The Wall".

== Characters ==
Character	Voice cast
Miyako Kōno	Mizuha Kuraoka
Nicole Saitō	Uta Kawase
Reika Satō	Chiharu
Miu Takigawa	Nagomi Saijō
Ayaka Tachikawa	Reina Miyase
Jun Toda	Ruri Umino
Sakura Fujima	Sally Amaki
Akane Maruyama	Kanae Shirosawa
Mikami Kamiki	Moe Suzuhana
Yuji Tojo	Urara Takatsuji
Tsubomi Hiragi	Aina Takeda

=== Other characters ===
Aoi Gōda (合田 蒼, Gōda Aoi)
Voiced by: Kenta Miyake
Gōda is manager of G.I. Productions.
The Wall (壁, Kabe)
Voiced by: Ryūsei Nakao
A mysterious wall that prints out directives that 22/7 must follow. Since The Wall's identity is unknown, the 22/7 members use a stuffed cat to represent it.
Sayuki Takigawa (滝川 紗幸, Takigawa Sayuki)
Voiced by: Aya Hisakawa
Sayuki is Miu's mother.
Haru Takigawa (Takigawa Haru)
Voiced by: Kokoa Amano
Haru is Miu's little sister.

== Media ==
=== Anime ===
An eight-episode original net animation called The Diary of Our Days was aired on March 28, 2018. The ONA was animated by CloverWorks and directed by Shin Wakabayashi.

An anime television series was announced in 2017. It is by A-1 Pictures and directed by Takao Abo, with Chiaki Nagai and Reiji Miyajima handling series composition, and Majiro designing the characters. The anime aired between January 11 and March 28, 2020, on Tokyo MX, GTV, GYT and BS11. AbemaTV streams the anime in Japan, while Aniplex of America streams it on FunimationNow. it also became available on Crunchyroll on February 10. The opening theme song is "Muzui" (ムズイ; lit. 'Difficult') by 22/7. The episodes feature unique ending themes, which are included in the Blu-ray Disc releases of the anime. The series ran for 12 episodes, with a 13th "extra episode" released on September 16, 2020.

No.	Title (Note: All English titles are taken from Funimation.)	Ending theme	Original release date
1	"Goodbye Small World"; Transliteration: "Sayonara, Watashi no Sasayakana Sekai" (Japanese: さよなら、私のささやかな世界)	"Sora no Emerald" (空のエメラルド, Sora no Emerarudo; lit. 'Emerald of the Sky') by 22/7	January 11, 2020
Miu Takigawa one day receives a letter about something called the GI Project brought to the zoo, where she meets seven other girls who had received the same letter. Aoi Goda, a representative of GI Productions, informs them all that they are now all members of an idol group who must take follow orders printed out by a mysterious Wall. Miu initially declines to take part, but after losing her part-time job, she decides to return for the sake of earning money for her family. The Wall names the group 22/7.
2	"Amid the Dizziness"; Transliteration: "Memai no Mannaka" (Japanese: めまいの真ん中)	"Sora no Emerald" (空のエメラルド, Sora no Emerarudo; lit. 'Emerald of the Sky') by 22/7	January 18, 2020
As the girls are ordered to take part in judging, Miu receives criticism from fellow member Nicole Saitō, who feels she isn't taking things seriously. Following the judging, the Wall decides that Miu will be the group's centre, angering Nicole more. Miu tries to distance herself from the group but is convinced to return following a talk from Sakura Fujima. Later, Miu's mother receives an invitation from the Wall.
3	"Hello New World"; Transliteration: "Konnichiwa, Atarashī Sekai" (Japanese: こんにちは、新しい世界)	"One of Them" by Miu Takigawa (Nagomi Saijō)	January 25, 2020
22/7 are given their first concert in front of 200 fans. As the concert gets underway, Miu's nerves start to get the better of her after seeing her mother in the audience. When an equipment malfunction causes the stereo system to stop working, however, Miu takes it upon herself to play the piano backstage so that the concert can finish.
4	"The Promised Flower"; Transliteration: "Yakusoku ni Saku Hana" (Japanese: 約束に咲く花)	"Ikirukoto ni Raku ni Naritai" (生きることに楽になりたい; lit. 'I Want to Live Easily') by Sakura Fujima (Sally Amaki)	February 1, 2020
As the girls visit Nara for a photoshoot, Sakura is lost in thought with memories of her late grandmother, who she was named after, and the cherry tree they used to visit together. Although it starts raining shortly they arrive at the location, Sakura is so awed by the sight of cherry blossoms that she decides to take a photo with everyone in the rain, which proves to be the perfect subject for the shoot.
5	"Just Flip It Over!"; Transliteration: "Hikkuri Kaeseba Ee-nende!" (Japanese: ひっくり返せばええねんで!)	"Yume no Fune" (夢の船; lit. 'Ship of Dreams') by Miyako Kōno (Mizuha Kuraoka)	February 8, 2020
The group is ordered to take part in the two-day Idol Tokyo Festival. Noticing the group struggling with emceeing in front of a huge crowd, Miyako Kōno holds an okinomiyaki party to help the group bond. During the party, Miyako recalls how she became an idol to search for her father and help her mother and family. Thanks to the party, the group eventually handle themselves much better the next day.
6	"Between the Even and Odd Numbers"; Transliteration: "Gūsū to Kisū no Aida" (Japanese: 偶数と奇数のあいだ)	"Yūtōsei ja Tsumaranai" (優等生じゃつまらない; lit. 'Being the Honor Student is Boring') by Reika Satō (Chiharu Hokaze)	February 15, 2020
The Wall issues out twenty orders at once, giving each of the girls both solo and group jobs while also assigning Reika Satō as the leader. As the group fly to Okinawa for a photoshoot, Reika is reluctant about wearing a skimpy swimsuit, feeling it lacks the nobility she has been striving for since her mother died at birth. After speaking with the other members, including Akane Maruyama, Reika eventually decides to wear the swimsuit to fulfil her role as a leader. Just as the successes of 22/7 and the shoot, all girls save for Jun Toda suddenly collapse.
7	"Happy✰Jet✰Coaster"; Transliteration: "Happī Jetto Kōsutā" (Japanese: ハッピー✰ジェット✰コースター)	"Jinsei wa Waltz" (人生はワルツ, Life is a Waltz) by Jun Toda (Ruri Umino)	February 22, 2020
With the other members hospitalized from food poisoning, Jun is left as the only member left to take on 22/7's busy schedule. When Jun was in hospital due to her weak respiratory tract, she recalls befriending another patient named Yuu, who showed her how to have fun with life even in hospital. Although Jun's condition improved thanks to Yuu's positivity, Yuu ended up passing away from her illness. Upon learning that she had fully recovered from her condition, Jun took it as a sign that she had received Yuu's life and became determined to live it to the fullest. After the end of a hectic work day, Jun is relieved to see the others fully recovered from their illness, while the Wall prints an order pertaining to a solo concert for 3000 people.
8	"Dreaming Robot"; Transliteration: "Yumemiru Robotto" (Japanese: ゆめみるロボット)	"Kanjō Muyō-ron" (感情無用論; lit. 'Emotionless') by Akane Maruyama (Kanae Shirozawa)	February 29, 2020
As 22/7 prepares for its solo concert, Akane recalls when she was a free-spirited child who disliked how strict her mother was. Ignoring her mother's instructions not to leave the house during a vacation to the mountains, she fell down a hill and was not found until three days later. The fallout of the incident and the pressure of the media put a strain on her parents and led to their divorce, leading Akane to shut off her emotions to avoid hurting anyone else. After the group's performance proves successful enough to warrant an encore, Akane becomes so moved that the emotions she held back for years emerge once again.
9	"Lullaby of the Stars"; Transliteration: "Ohoshi-sama no Rarabai" (Japanese: お星さまのララバイ)	"Moonlight" by Ayaka Tachibana (Reina Miyase)	March 7, 2020
With a concert planned to celebrate the group's one-year anniversary, the girls are sent on an overnight trip to a hot spring inn in Hakone to rest up. Ayaka Tachibana recalls her childhood, where she often squabbled with her older sisters, Ayane and Ayana. One day, Ayaka discovers Ayane being bullied for defending her and stepped in to protect her, after which they were both rescued by Ayana. Starting from middle school, Ayaka became a manga artist, initially joining 22/7 to aid her in that goal. During the trip, just as Akane and Miyako start to argue with each other, Ayaka sings a song passed onto her by her mother to calm them down, after which she gets a little closer with Miu. However, the girls are shocked when the Wall suddenly issues an order calling the group to disband.
10	"Goodbye, Our World"; Transliteration: "Sayonara, Watashi-tachi no Sekai" (Japanese: さよなら, 私たちの世界)	"Sora no Emerald" (空のエメラルド, Sora no Emerarudo; lit. 'Emerald of the Sky') by 22/7	March 14, 2020
The girls are left in dismay as the Wall continues to issue orders to disband the group and close down all offices, producing a forced conference announcing their disbanding and leading to fan backlash. After the girls are forced to leave their dorm and return to their homes, Nicole, who saves Miu from some hounding reporters, asks her to think about what the most precious thing to her is. As one month passes without any further orders from the Wall, Nicole thinks back to her elementary school days, during which Miu transferred into her class.
11	"Chasing Our Dreams"; Transliteration: "Tada Sono Senaka o Oitsuzukete" (Japanese: ただその背中を追いつづけて)	"Kodoku wa Kirai ja nai" (孤独は嫌いじゃない; lit. 'I Don't Hate Loneliness') by Nicole Saitō (Uta Kawase)	March 21, 2020
In elementary school, Nicole – who was shy and had trouble speaking – was confronted by school bullies into playing the witch for a school play of Snow White. Despite being shy and silent herself, Miu used her piano playing skills to give Nicole the confidence to perform. However, during the play, Miu lashed out at one of them after she sabotages Nicole's performance, leading her to transfer schools. Despite never getting to thank Miu, Nicole managed to use the courage she gained from her to aim towards becoming an idol, leading to the reunion of 22/7. Back in the present, on the anniversary of when 22/7 was first formed, Miu sneaks into the Wall's room, followed by all other members, where they thank each other for all the things they got to experience. As the girls cry over having to part ways, the Wall begins to speak for the first time.
12	"22/7"; Transliteration: "Nanabun no Nijūni" (Japanese: ナナブンノニジュウニ)	"Muzui" (ムズイ; lit. 'It's Difficult') by 22/7	March 28, 2020
The Wall claims that the members were all chosen randomly as part of an experiment called Project 22/7, setting them various tasks to see how they would act as idols before disbanding them to move onto the next phase. As Nicole's requests to let everyone continue as an idol group falls on deaf ear, Miu begins to rebel against the Wall, prompting the others to do the same and smash through it. On the other side, they discover a room full of photos of everyone from their childhood. Venturing further up some stairs, the girls arrive at a stage at the zoo where all of their dedicated fans are waiting, providing the backing music for their true anniversary concert. When the girls reaffirm their love of being idols and perform for their fans, it is revealed that the Wall secretly ordered the concert to be arranged under the condition, that they should not be forced to come. Meanwhile, the Wall prints orders to have three new members join the group.
13 (OVA)	"8 + 3 = ?"	"Kamisama ni Yubi o Sasareta Bokutachi" (神様に指を差された僕たち; lit. 'We Who Were Pointed At by God') by Minami Kamiki (Moe Suzuhana), Yuki Tojo (Urara Takatsuji) & Tsubomi Hiragi (Aina Takeda)	September 16, 2020
Those three new members – Yuki Tojo, Mikami Kamiki, and Tsubomi Hiiragi – are suddenly recruited by the Wall, upsetting Miyako, who wanted to enjoy Christmas with just the regular eight members. As Miyako struggles to accept the new members into their group, she hears from Yuki about how serious they are about becoming idols, leading her to become more accepting.

=== Manga ===
A manga adaptation, titled 22/7 +a, written by Reiji Miyajima and illustrated by Nao Kasai, was serialized on Shogakukan's Sunday Webry website and app from January 12 to March 29, 2020, telling an original story not told in the anime. Shogakukan collected its chapters in two tankōbon volumes, released on February 12 and April 10, 2020.

=== Game ===
On December 24, 2019, a rhythm mobile game titled 22/7 Ongaku no Jikan was announced and in development by Aniplex, H.a.n.d., and Forward Works. It was released on May 27, 2020, for iOS and Android. On September 30, 2021, the game announced it ended services on December 22.

== Reception ==
The series received a mixed reception from reviewers. Chiaka Mitama reviewed the first episode for Anime Feminist noting that while the first episode wants to tell viewers that the "idol industry is full of shit" and pushing the idea that adults are lying, it lionizes the founding of the 22/7 idol group, which gets its orders from a "higher being" named The Wall. Mitama noted that the situation seemed cult-like that, although the characters are voiced by the real life 22/7 group, the anime lore is different from the actual idol group, and seems to imply that the idol industry and adulthood are not "horrible webs of lies". Mitama later said that The Wall in the series makes it stand out as opposed to other Japanese idol anime. Vrai Kaiser, another reviewer for Anime Feminist wrote that the series differed from Action Heroine Cheer Fruits and Zombie Land Saga in that it set itself "up for a higher fall" and added that The Wall seems to be "straight out of a horror film" but becomes a "quirky, beneficent mascot of sorts", which they found "unsettling" and wondered whether the show would do anything with the Class S "interactions between Miu and Sakura" or not.

Anime News Network reviewers has divided views on the series. In an anime preview guide, Theron Martin gave the series 3 out of 5 stars, saying that sometimes it hinted at being a typical idol series, but other times had a more weighty tone, wondered the reason for naming the group 22/7, wondered what he described as a strange storyline focusing on a "whole order-granting mystical wall thing", and said the series will suffer because it is being released after Carole & Tuesday. In contrast, Nick Creamer was more positive, praising the "authentic, captivating performance" of Nagomi Saijō as Miu Takigawa, the character development around her, the dialogue, and character moments, said that this series is centered around human beings, but said that the debut was not "flawless", while criticizing the personalities of those being idols alongside Miu as falling into archetypes. James Beckett also praised the presence of bilingual performer Sally Amaki who plays Sakura Fujima in the multimedia projects of the real-life 22/7 group, and said that the series is "one of more interesting idol anime debuts" she had seen some time, and said that it was unlike Revue Starlight but had a "notable veneer of melancholy and self-reflexivity". He also praised the different personalities of the idols in the group and the voice acting for the group's members. Rebecca Silverman was more critical, saying the series is "something darker than your average girl idol show" due to the presence of The Wall, and believed that the series would be simply about "kindly efforts of an otherworldly entity helping girls with low self-esteem or great/thwarted ambitions to shine", and said that despite her criticisms, the episode is "worth at least checking out".

Steve Jones and Michelle Liu of Anime News Network talked about the anime , noting that by episode 9, the Wall had remained a mystery, showing it was not giving up on "the most unsettling part of itself", noted it cribbed from AKB0048, the role of Sally Amaki in 22/7 and called the series "well-crafted in an impressed way". It was also stated that the series took hairstyle tips from Mysterious Girlfriend X, that the series is contradictory, with "serious character drama frequently rubbing up against bubbly idol shenanigans", is not interested in "the actual works of show business", and has some "real gay energy" between Miu and Sakura. Reviews of the final three episodes by another reviewer of said site – James Beckett – was more critical, saying the series was entertaining but became a "largely superficial idol drama", noting that the female friendship between them was shown off screen, believed that series has only been "interested in serving as a pretty commercial for an idol group that is already famous and successful", felt the climax was not earned, called the series "moderately entertaining" while he praised the character development for Nicole and the scene of the girls taking down The Wall.

== See also ==
- AKB0048, another anime based on one of Akimoto's groups, AKB48
