= Akinari Matsuno =

Japanese light novel author

Akinari Matsuno 松野 秋鳴
- Born: 1979; Kawanishi, Hyōgo, Hyōgo Prefecture, Japan
- Died: 18 April 2011 (age 32)
- Occupation: Novelist
- Writing career
- Period: 2005–2011
- Genre: Light novel
- Notable work: MM! (2007)
- Notable awards: MF Bunko J Light Novel Rookie Award (2005)

Akinari Matsuno (松野 秋鳴, Matsuno Akinari; 1979 – 18 April 2011) was a Japanese light novel author best known for his series MM!.

== Biography ==
Matsuno was born in Kawanishi City, Japan in 1979. His debut work, The Selfish Battleship of Class 2-3 (the release title changed to Aoba-kun and Uchuu-jin), under his pseudonym Akinari, received the Brilliancy Prize in the 2005 MF Bunko J Light Novel Rookie Award, the second work ever to receive this prize since its conception the year prior.

His second work, MM!, which got adapted into an anime television series in 2010, had not been completed by the time of his death on the 18 April 2011 at the age of 32. While his official cause of death has not been released to the public, Ichirō Sakaki, who also writes for MF Bunko J, revealed on Twitter that Matsuno had been sick since 2010 and had not been appearing at company events.

== Works ==
- Aoba-kun and Uchuu-jin (2005–2006) (Published by MF Bunko J, illustrated by Chōniku)
- MM! (2007–2010) (Published by MF Bunko J, illustrated by QP:flapper)
