= Clara Matsuno =

German-born educator in Japan

- Born: Clara Louise Zitelmann; 2 August 1853; Berlin
- Died: 1931 (aged 77–78); Berlin, Germany
- Other names: 松野 クララ, Matsuno Kurara, Klara Matsuno
- Occupations: Teacher, musician

Clara Matsuno (松野 クララ, Matsuno Kurara; 2 August 1853 – 1931), born Clara Louise Zitelmann, was a German-born educator, a pioneer in the kindergarten movement in Japan.

== Early life ==
Clara Louise Zitelmann was born and educated in Berlin, the daughter of Carl Friedrich Zitelmann and Emma Pauline Ulrike Zitelmann.

== Career ==
In 1876, Matsuno became the first head teacher at the first kindergarten in Japan, with Froebel-inspired methods emphasizing outdoor play, puzzles, songs and games. The school's principal, Shinzo Seki, translated for her, as she did not speak Japanese upon arrival in Japan. She was also a teacher-training instructor at the Tokyo College of Education for Women from 1876 to 1881. She also taught English and German, and gave piano lessons for the Imperial Household Agency.

== Personal life and legacy ==
Clara Louise Zitelmann married Hazama Matsuno (松 野 礀) in Ueno in 1876; the couple met in Berlin, where Matsuno was studying forestry. They were the first German-Japanese couple married in Japan; she became a Japanese citizen by marriage. They had a daughter, Frieda Fumi, who died in 1901, at age 24. Matsuno's husband died in 1908; for a time she lived with her sister and sister-in-law in Japan. She died in Germany in 1931, aged 77 years.

The novel Ein Adoptivkind: Die Geschichte eines Japaners (1916) by Katharina Zitelmann is based in part on Clara Matsuno's life. In 1976, the Japanese post office released a postage stamp honoring Clara Matsuno on the centennial of her founding the kindergarten program at the Tokyo College of Education for Women. There is a monument honoring Matsuno, with the same image as on the stamp, in the Aoyama Cemetery in Tokyo.
