= QP:flapper =

Japanese illustrator duo

QP:flapper is a two-member illustrator unit consisting of Japanese artists Tometa Ohara and Koharu Sakura. Since 2001, they have provided character designs for anime and light novels. In 2005, they debuted as character designers in Leaf's game Kusari.

According to an interview in Dengeki G's Magazine, Ohara and Sakura first met at Ikebukuro's Taishōromandō, a specialty store for goods from Sega's Sakura Wars franchise. After they formed as a unit, they produced dōjinshi based on various games by Leaf such as To Heart. Ohara and Sakura's pseudonyms were initially simply Tometa (トメ太) and Pimeko (ぴめこ), but Pimeko changed her name to Koharu Sakura in October 2006. In response of this, Tometa added Ohara as a surname to his pseudonym. However, they still used their old aliases when working on visual novels.

== Members ==
- Tometa Ohara (小原 トメ太, Ohara Tometa) or simply Tometa
- Koharu Sakura (さくら 小春, Sakura Koharu) or Pimeko (ぴめこ)

== Works ==
=== Character design ===
==== Anime ====
- Celestial Method
- Etotama ("pretty" version)
- Ongaku Shōjo
- Regalia: The Three Sacred Stars
- Idoly Pride

==== Social games ====
- Girl Friend Beta

==== Visual novels ====
Ohara and Sakura are credited under the pseudonyms Tometa and Pimeko, respectively.

- Berry's - 2013 (Sphere)
- Edo Ranze ~Come on! Mito Hime-sama~ - 2008 (Alice Soft)
- Eiyū*Senki GOLD (guest artist) - 2015 (Tenco)
- Girl Friend Beta: Kimi to Sugosu Natsuyasumi - 2015 (Bandai Namco Entertainment)
- Kusari - 2005 (Leaf)
- Hoshi no Ōji-kun - 2011 (Leaf)

==== Others ====
- Onsen Musume (Original character design; Fuuka Arima by Koharu Sakura, and Kanada Baden Yufuin by Tometa Ohara)
- 22/7 (Original character design; Ayaka Tachikawa by Koharu Sakura, and Akane Maruyama by Tometa Ohara)

=== Illustrations ===
==== Light novels ====
- Boku no Kawaii Ojōsama - 2012 (Fujimi Fantasia Bunko)
- Boku wa Tomodachi ga Sukunai Universe (anthology light novel) - 2015 (MF Bunko J)
- Bokutachi no Paradox - 2007 (Fujimi Mystery Bunko)
- Girlish Number (character design and colored illustrations only) - 2016 (Dengeki G's Magazine)
- MM! - 2007 (MF Bunko J)
- Gadget Girl (credited under their respective names) - 2006 (Super Dash Bunko)
- Lucky Chance! - 2007 (Dengeki Bunko)
- Rock Paper Scissors - 2013 (Fujimi Fantasia Bunko)

==== Anime eyecatch ====
- Akashic Records of Bastard Magic Instructor (episode 8, Sakura only)
- Sasami-san@Ganbaranai (episode 11, Ohara only)
- Oreimo (episode 3)
- Wooser's Hand-to-Mouth Life (episode 5)
- Magia Record (episode 10)
